= Nilambur Assembly constituency =

Constituency of the Kerala legislative assembly in India

Nilambur
- Constituency No. 35 for the Kerala Legislative Assembly
- Nilambur In Malappuram

Constituency details
- Country: India
- Region: South India
- State: Kerala
- District: Malappuram
- Lok Sabha constituency: Wayanad
- Established: 1965
- Total electors: 2,25,356 (2021)
- Reservation: None

Member of Legislative Assembly
- 16th Kerala Legislative Assembly
- Incumbent Aryadan Shoukath
- Party: INC
- Alliance: UDF
- Elected year: 2026

Nilambur Assembly constituency is one of the 140 state legislative assembly constituencies in Kerala in southern India. It is also one of the seven state legislative assembly constituencies included in Wayanad Lok Sabha constituency.

== Local self-governed segments ==
Nilambur Assembly constituency is composed of the following local self-governed segments:

Sl no.	Name	Status (Grama panchayat/Municipality)	Taluk
1	Nilambur	Municipality	Nilambur
2	Vazhikadavu	Grama panchayat	Nilambur
3	Moothedam	Grama panchayat	Nilambur
4	Edakkara	Grama panchayat	Nilambur
5	Pothukal	Grama panchayat	Nilambur
6	Chungathara	Grama panchayat	Nilambur
7	Karulayi	Grama panchayat	Nilambur
8	Amarambalam	Grama panchayat	Nilambur

== Members of Legislative Assembly ==
The following list contains all members of Kerala Legislative Assembly who have represented Nilambur Assembly constituency during the period of various assemblies:

Election	Name	Party
1967	K. Kunhali	Communist Party of India
1970	M. P. Gangadharan	Indian National Congress
1977	Aryadan Muhammed	Indian National Congress
1980	C. Haridas	Indian National Congress
1980*	Aryadan Muhammed	Indian National Congress
1982	T. K. Hamza	Independent politician
1987	Aryadan Muhammed	Indian National Congress
1991	Aryadan Muhammed	Indian National Congress
1996	Aryadan Muhammed	Indian National Congress
2001	Aryadan Muhammed	Indian National Congress
2006	Aryadan Muhammed	Indian National Congress
2011	Aryadan Muhammed	Indian National Congress
2016	P. V. Anvar	Independent politician
2021	P. V. Anvar	Independent politician
2025^	Aryadan Shoukath	Indian National Congress
2026	Aryadan Shoukath	Indian National Congress

*by-election

== Election results ==
Percentage change (±%) denotes the change in the number of votes from the immediate previous election.

=== 2026 ===
2026 Kerala Legislative Assembly election: Nilambur
Party	Candidate	Votes	%	±%
INC	Aryadan Shoukath	113,586	59.91	
LDF	U. Sharafali	58,735	30.98	
BDJS	Gireesh Mekkad	12,660	6.68	
NOTA	None of the above	2,672	1.41	
AAP	Jaisal Maliyekkal	1,942	1.02	
Margin of victory		54,851		
Turnout		1,89,595		
INC hold		Swing		

Local body	INC – Aryadan Shoukath	LDF – U. Sharafali	NDA – Girish Mekkattu	Leading	Lead
Vazhikkadavu	21,637	11,357	2,317	INC	10,280
Moothadam	10,244	4,390	845	INC	5,854
Edakkara	12,414	6,509	1,633	INC	5,905
Pothukal	14,801	7,765	1,723	INC	7,036
Chungathara	11,084	5,824	1,305	INC	5,260
Nilambur Municipality	21,155	9,937	2,250	INC	11,218
Karulai	4,814	3,158	362	INC	1,656
Amarambalam	16,045	9,141	2,066	INC	6,904
Total EVM	112,194	58,081	12,501	INC	54,113
Postal votes	1,392	654	159	INC	738
Total votes	113,586	58,735	12,660	INC	54,851

=== 2025 by-election ===
==== By political party ====
2025 by-election: Nilambur
Party	Candidate	Votes	%	±%
INC	Aryadan Shoukath	77,737	44.17	▼1.17
CPI(M)	M. Swaraj	66,660	37.88	▼9.02
Independent	P. V. Anvar	19,760	11.23	▲11.23
BJP	Mohan George	8,648	4.91	▼0.05
SDPI	Sadik Naduthodi	2,075	1.18	▼0.71
NOTA	None of the above	630	0.36	
Majority		11,077	6.29	
Turnout		175,989	75.27%	
INC gain from Independent		Swing		

==== By local self-governed segment ====
Status (Gram panchayat/municipality)	Votes			
Status (Gram panchayat/municipality)	Indian National Congress	Communist Party of India (Marxist)	P. V. Anvar	Lead
Amarambalam	10065	9814	2447	704
Chungathara	10426	9039	2824	1287
Edakkara	7739	6569	2122	1170
Karulai	6403	6533	1870	118
Moothedam	7986	5924	2216	2067
Nilambur	14362	10393	2124	3967
Pothukal	7851	7461	1585	307
Vazhikkadavu	12255	10426	4544	1829

=== 2021 ===
2021 Kerala Legislative Assembly election: Nilambur
Party	Candidate	Votes	%	±%
CPI(M)	P. V. Anvar	81,227	46.9	
INC	V. V. Prakash	78,527	40.03	
BJP	T. K. Ashokkumar	8,500	4.96	
SDPI	K. Babu Mani	3,281	1.89	
Independent	Sajadurahman C.P.	559	0.32	
ICSP	Anila Mathew	509	0.29	
NOTA	None of the above	507	0.29	
Margin of victory		2,700	1.54	
Turnout		173,205	76.6	
Independent hold		Swing		

==== By local self-governed segment ====
Status (Gram panchayat/municipality)	Votes		
Status (Gram panchayat/municipality)	Indian National Congress	Bharatiya Janata Party	Independent (P. V. Anvar)
Amarambalam	9746	1446	11,238
Chungathara	11,347	1072	11,033
Edakkara	7,745	1022	7,757
Karulai	6159	501	7605
Moothedam	8915	690	6584
Nilambur	11,673	1464	13,200
Pothukal	7813	860	8319
Vazhikkadavu	13,436	1367	13,471

=== 2016 ===
==== By political party ====
2016 Kerala Legislative Assembly election: Nilambur
Party	Candidate	Votes	%	±%
CPI(M)	P. V. Anvar	77,858	47.91%	−
INC	Aryadan Shoukath	66,354	40.83%	▼7.81
BDJS	Girish Mekkatt	12,284	7.56%	−
SDPI	K. Babu Mani	4,751	2.92%	▲1.04
NOTA	None of the above	1,256	0.77%	−
Margin of victory		11,504	7.08%	▲2.98
Turnout		162,503	78.83%	▲0.89
Registered electors		206,132		
Independent gain from INC		Swing		

==== By local self-governed segment ====
Status (Gram panchayat/municipality)	Votes		
Status (Gram panchayat/municipality)	Indian National Congress	Bharath Dharma Jana Sena	Independent (P. V. Anvar)
Amarambalam	8379	1909	11,080
Chungathara	9586	1964	9890
Edakkara	6195	1919	7,486
Karulai	5560	533	7030
Moothedam	7048	822	6830
Nilambur	11,241	1659	14,011
Pothukal	7069	1363	8009
Vazhikkadavu	10,917	1986	13,079

=== 2011 ===
==== By political party ====
2011 Kerala Legislative Assembly election: Nilambur
Party	Candidate	Votes	%	±%
INC	Aryadan Muhammed	66,331	48.64%	
Independent	M. Thomas Mathew	60,733	44.54%	
BJP	K. C. Velayudhan	4,425	3.25%	
SDPI	C. G. Unni	2,566	1.88%	
BSP	Thariyan Kiliyan	1,291	0.95%	
Independent	Thomas Mathew	1,012	0.74%	−
Margin of victory		5,598	4.10%	
Turnout		136,358	77.94%	
Registered electors		174,945		
INC hold		Swing		

==== By local self-governed segment ====
Status (Gram panchayat/municipality)	Votes		
Status (Gram panchayat/municipality)	Indian National Congress	Bharatiya Janata Party	Independent (M. Thomas Mathew)
Amarambalam	8363	1008	7929
Chungathara	9690	493	8745
Edakkara	7286	562	6371
Karulai	5069	277	4822
Moothedam	5690	368	4968
Nilambur	12,454	669	11,280
Pothukal	7182	463	6743
Vazhikkadavu	10,383	583	9572

== See also ==
- Nilambur
- Malappuram district
- List of constituencies of the Kerala Legislative Assembly
- 2016 Kerala Legislative Assembly election
