= Moothedam =

- village
- Location in Kerala, India Moothedam (India)
- Coordinates: 11.334008°N 76.309769°E
- Country: India
- State: Kerala
- District: Malappuram

Languages
  - Official: Malayalam, English
- Time zone: UTC+5:30 (IST)
- PIN: 679 331
- Telephone code: 00914931

Moothedam is a small town and panchayath in Nilambur taluk of the Malappuram district in the Indian State of Kerala. It is situated on the foothills of the Western Ghats near Mukurthi National Park in the Nilgiris district of Tamil Nadu. The panchayath is surrounded by two rivers, the Punnappuzha to the north and west and the Karimpuzha to the south.

The people across Moothedam panjayath, had proved their social works among all the process.

Moothedam had been primarily an agrarian society and it still is to an extent. The two bridges respectively across punnapuzha (in kattadi) and karimpuzha (in palangara) built in late 90's boosted the development of the region.

Karappuram, one of the main towns of the panchayath hosts the majority of offices and other government buildings, with the exception of higher secondary school which is at the moothedam town.

== Suburbs and villages ==
- Moothedam, Karappuram, Kalkkulam, Nellikkuth and Thalippadam
- Palankara, Edakkara, Karulai and Chungathara

Moothedam panchayath is surrounded by the Punnappuzha river, and forest. The Grama panchayath office is situated at Karappuram. There are 18 wards in this panchayath.

TK Afsath is the Panchayath President.

== Transportation ==
Moothedam village connects to other parts of India through Nilambur town. State Highway No.28 starts from Nilambur and connects to Ooty, Mysore and Bangalore through Highways.12,29 and 181. National highway No.66 passes through Ramanattukara and the northern stretch connects to Goa and Mumbai. The southern stretch connects to Cochin and Trivandrum. State. The nearest airport is at Karipur. The nearest major railway station is at Nilambur Road railway station.12 kilometers from Moothedam Town
