= Pothukal =

Pothukallu Pothukallu
- Town
- Thampurattikkallu Temple
- Interactive map of Pothukallu
- Coordinates: 11.40566°N 76.25224°E
- Country: India
- State: Kerala
- District: Malappuram

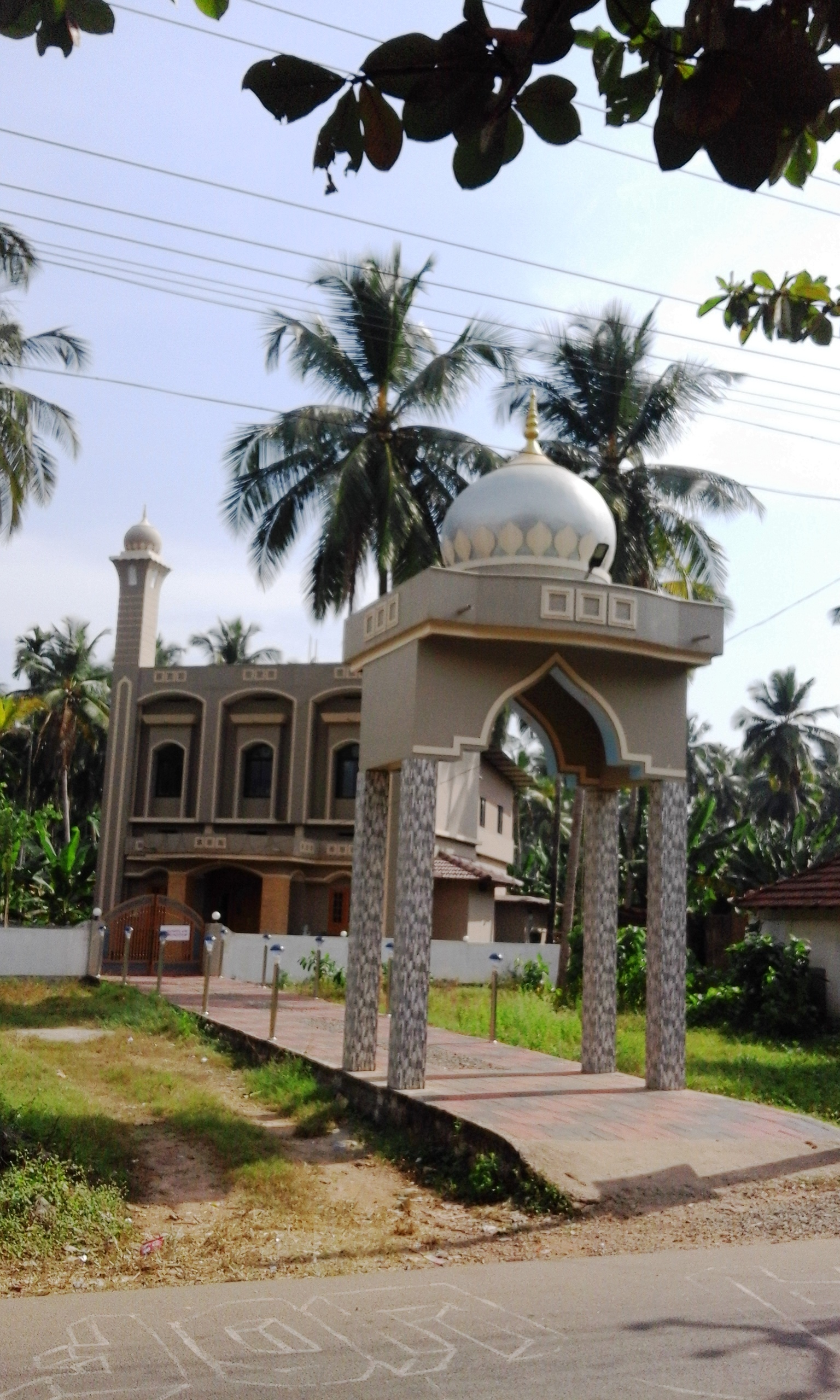
Munderi Sunni Masjidh

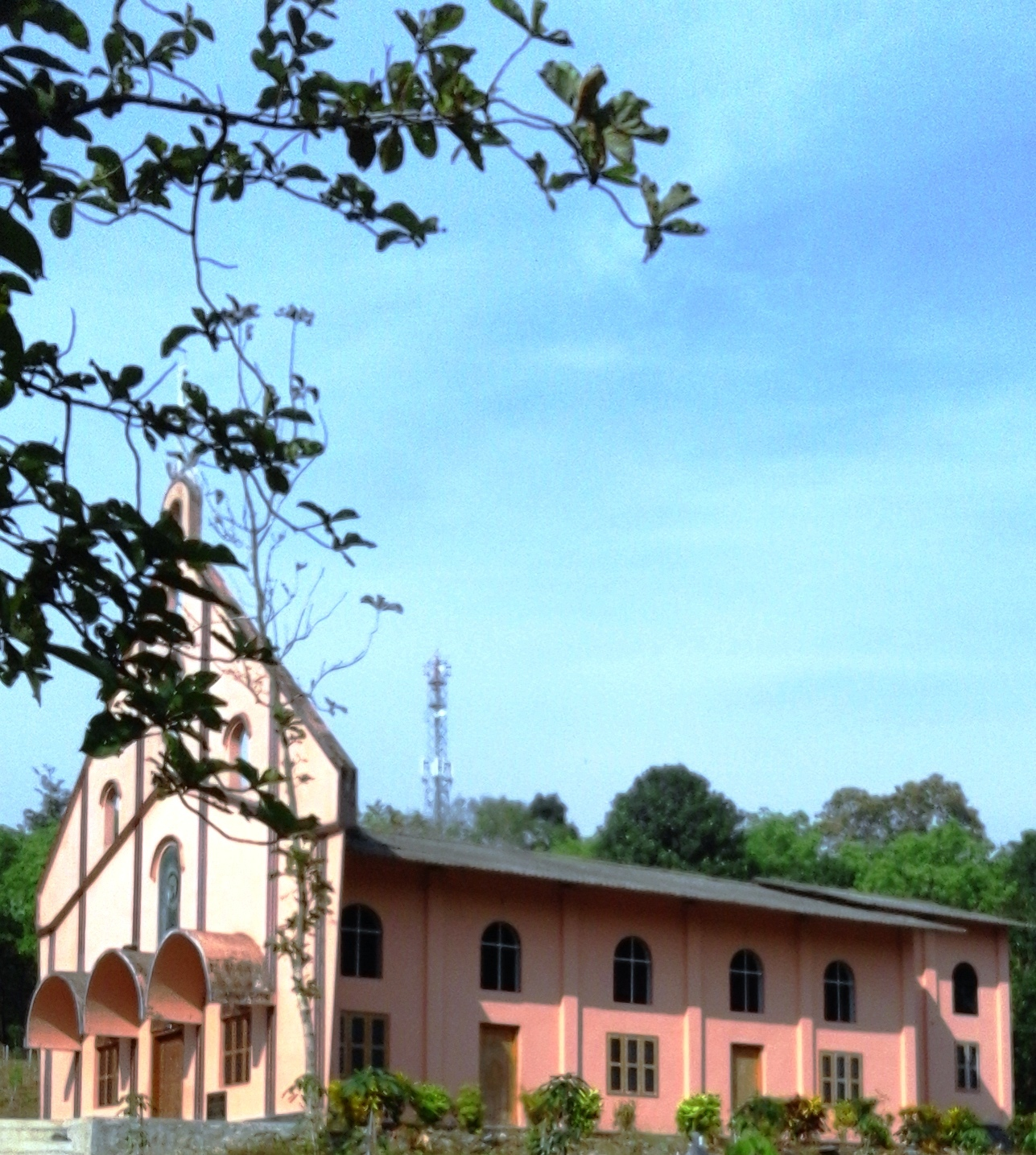
Munderi Church

Pothukallu (Pothukal) is located between Palunda and Munderi (9.0 km from Palunda in the Nilambur Taluk of Malappuram District). Pothukallu is well known for its greenery, hospitality of the natives, and availability of all basic amenities, including schools, hospitals, shopping centers etc. There is a police station, forest station, mosque, church, and temple at nearby locations. Pothukallu is located at the boundary of three districts namely, Wayanad and Malappuram of Kerala state and The Nilgiris of Tamil Nadu.

== Administration ==
State : Kerala

District : Malappuram

Taluk : Nilambur

Local Body : Pothukallu Grama Panchayath

Parliament constituency : Wayanad

Member of Parliament : Priyanka Gandhi

Legislative Assembly: Nilambur

Member of Legislative Assembly : Aryadan Shoukath

Sub RTO : Nilambur (KL 71)

Nearest Cities: Edakkara, Chungathara, Nilambur

Area Telephone Code: 04931

Postal Code: 679334

== Culture ==
Pothukallu is a village in the Malappuram district. Historically, the area was part of the Nilambur Kovilakam estate prior to Indian independence.

== Naxalite threat ==
In November, 2016, three naxalites were killed near Karulai in an encounter with Kerala police. Naxalite leader Kappu Devaraj from Andhra Pradesh is included in the list of killed in the incident. Villages like Mundakkadavu, Kalkullam and Uchakkulam near Karulai are threatened by Naxalite attacks. Naxalites visit the locality regularly and ask for food and shelter from the tribals. The police are also combing the area regularly but have not arrested any naxalites. On 27 September 2016, there was firing between the Maoists and the Kerala police in this area and no one was injured in this incident.

== Transportation ==
Pothukallu village connects to other parts of India through Nilambur town. The proposed Hill highway SH 59 (Nandarapadavu in Kasargod to Parassala in Thiruvananthapuram via Meppadi) is passing through Pothukallu. State Highway SH 28(Kozhikode- Nilambur - Gudallur Road) starts from Ramanattukara passes through Nilambur and connects to Ooty, Mysore and Bangalore. National highway NH 66 passes through Ramanattukara connects to Kannur, Goa and Mumbai. Nilambur- Valancheri road SH 73 connects Nilambur to Perinthalmanna in shortest distance. Nilambur- Perumbilavu SH 39 connects to Thrissur, Kottayam, Ernakulam and Thiruvananthapuram via Perinthalmanna. The nearest airport is at Kozhikode. The nearest major railway station is Nilambur Road.

Nearest Medical College : Manjeri Govt. Medical College

Nearest District Hospital : Nilambur Govt. District Hospital

Nearest Checkpost: Vazhikkadavu

Nearest KSRTC Bus station : Nilambur

Pothukallu is accessible by road from Nilambur Town. The distance is 20 km.

- Nilambur to Chungathara: 9 km
- Chungathara to Pothukallu: 11 km
- Pothukallu to Munderi: 8 km

== Villages and Suburbs ==
- Uppada, Anakkallu, Paduanagar
- Muthukulam and Nettikkulam, Pothukallu
- Kunippala, Velumbiyampadam, Ampittanpotti, Neerpuzha mukkam
- Thamburattikallu, Munderi
- Bhoodan colony, Panakayam
- Kodalipoyil, Chembankolly
- Kavalappara, Santhigram, Vellimuttam

== Important Landmarks ==
- Catholicate HSS, Pothukallu
- Pothukallu Gramapanchayath
- Pothukallu Village office
- Pothukallu KSFE
- Pothukallu Bus stand
- Pothukallu KSEB Section
- Pothukallu PHC
- Dharmasastha Temple, Thamburattikkallu
- Farm Club, Bhoodhanam Colony, Pothukallu
- Assembly of God Church, Pothukallu
- S.N.Guru Seva Mandir, Nettikullam
- St.Mary's Catholic Church, Pathirippadam
- Chathamunda Masjidh, Chathamunda
- NSS School, Uppada
- St. Paul's Malankara Catholic Church, Uppada
- New Holy Bible College, Palunda
- A L P School, Boodan colony
- Post Office, Bhoodan colony
- Siva Temple, Santhigram
- St.Marys orthodox church, Muthukulam
- MKMM LPS Velumbiyampadam
- Nirmala HSS Erumamunda
- Pothukal Forest Station, Kunipala
- Friends Supermarket, pothukallu
