= Munderi, Malappuram =

Munderi Mount Area
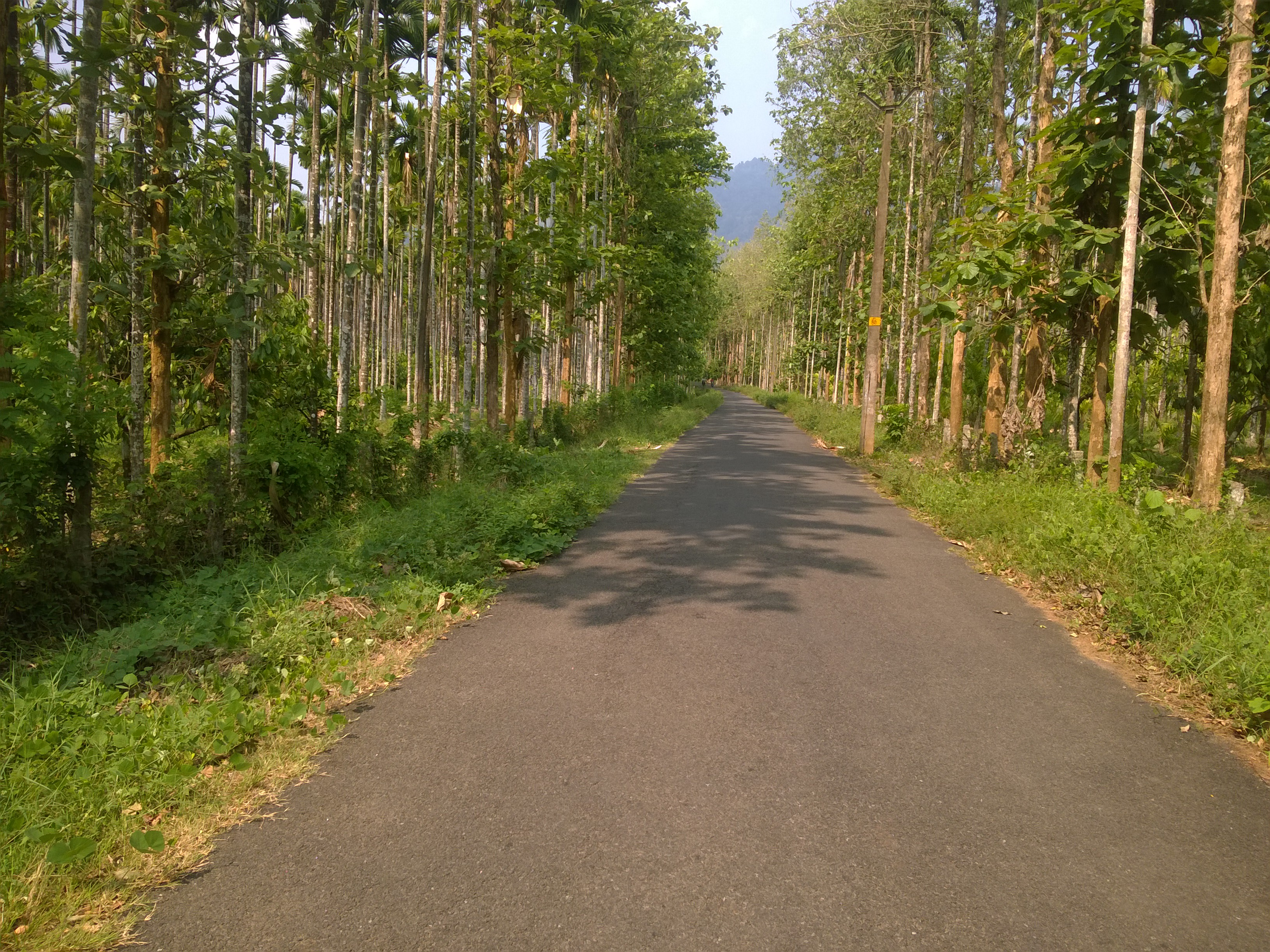
- Teak trees in Munderi
- Interactive map of Munderi
- Coordinates: 11.443627°N 76.259547°E
- Country: India
- State: Kerala
- District: Malappuram

Languages
  - Official: Malayalam, English
- Time zone: UTC+5:30 (IST)
- Postal Code: 679334
- 04931: 04931

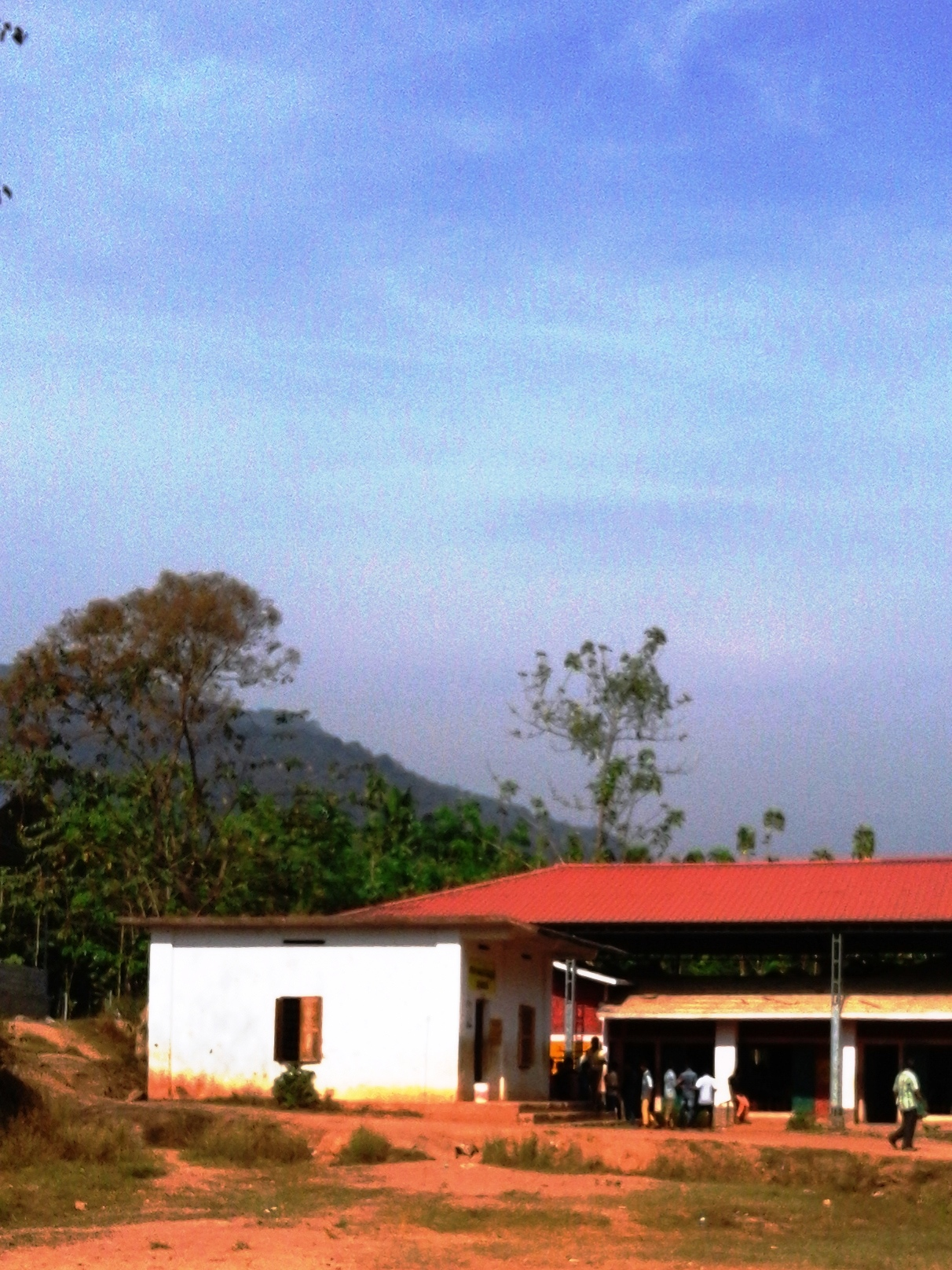
View of Tamil Nadu from Munderi

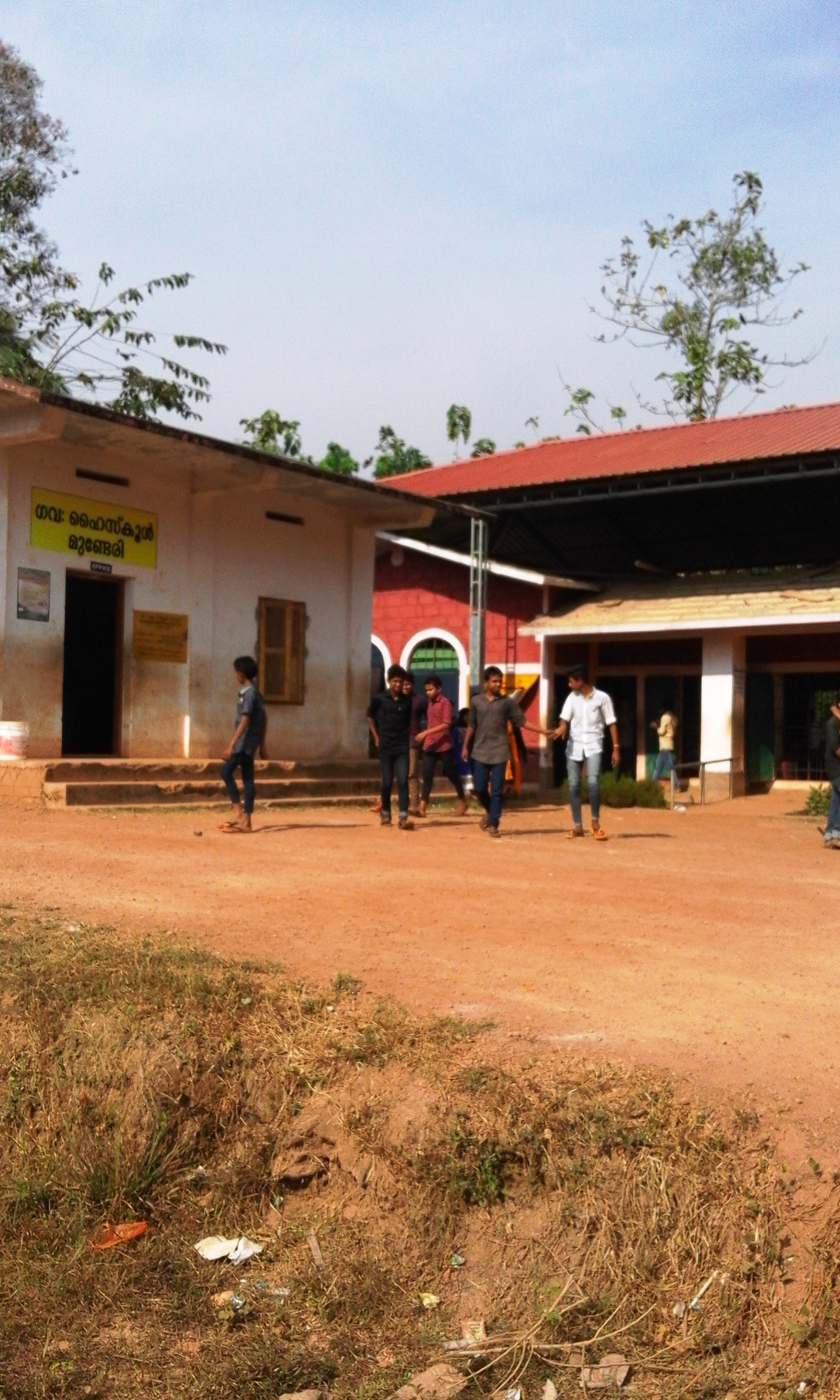
Munderi Highschool

Munderi is a small village in Nilambur Taluk of Malappuram District, in Kerala. It got the name from "Mount Area" as mountain ranges surround it.

== Chaliyar River ==
River Chaliyar originates from the Elampalari Hills, which is located near the meeting point of Malappuram, Wayanad and the Nilgiris districts; from where it flows through Thalappaali and reaches Thamburattikkallu, where Neerppuzha, coming from 'Glen-rock' through 'Appangaappu' (origin: up and gap), the eastern part of Munderi joins with it as the first tributary.

== Plantations ==
Munderi is the place where Asia's first rubber plantation was established. Munderi is also famous for its Seed Garden Complex, spread on Thamburattikkallu-Thalappali road. It is the largest agricultural farm in Kerala and is owned by the Govt. of Kerala (Dept. of Agriculture). There was a big silica stone called 'Thamburattikkallu' at the place with the same name (western part of Munderi), which was demolished and given to the Excel Glass company in Alappuzha, in early 1990s.

== Nearby Sports Clubs ==
- Flame Arts and Sports Club Thamburatikallu
- Juvants Arts& Sports Club Munderi
- Navodhanam Arts & Sports Club Munderi
- Yuvadhara Arts & Sports Club Mukkam

== Nearby Towns ==
- Pothukal (8 Km)
- Chungathara (18 Km)
- Edakkara (19 Km)
- Nilambur (28 Km)
- Manjeri (50 Km)

== Administration ==
Munderi village is part of Pothukal grama panchayat. Pothukallu is also known for its greenery and scenic riverside villages. Pothukallu has more hospitals, schools and shopping centers. There is a police station in Pothukallu. This Panchayath is part of Nilambur Assembly Constituency and the MLA is Mr. P.V Anvar.

== Transportation ==
Munderi village connects to other parts of India through Nilambur town. State Highway No.28 starts from Nilambur and connects to Ooty, Mysore and Bangalore through Highways.12,29 and 181. National highway No.66 passes through Ramanattukara and the northern stretch connects to Goa and Mumbai. The southern stretch connects to Cochin and Trivandrum. The nearest airport is at Kozhikode. The nearest major railway station is at Shornur.
