= Maruthappuzha =

The Maruthappuzha is a tributary of the Punnappuzha in Kerala, India, which merges with the Karimpuzha and thus finally joins the Chaliyar. The Maruthappuzha originates as two separate streams from the Devala (eastern branch) and the Pandalur (northern branch) areas of Nilagiri district and join near Marutha to form the Maruthappuzha. The Muringamunda Puzha (coming from forests north of Thannikkadavu) and Karakkodan puzha (originating from the foothills of Nadukani forests) also joins with the Maruthappuzha at Palemad and Munda respectively.

The Maruthappuzha is also known as the Kalakkanpuzha because of the muddy colour of its water.

The Maruthappuzha-Punnappuzha belt is famous for its gold deposits; although it has not been exploited on a large scale. After monsoon, fine particles of gold wash away from the Maruthamalai hill, driving people to flock to the Maruthappuzha (among other rivers) to filter gold from the muddy waters.
