= Punnappuzha =

River in India

Punnappuzha is a tributary of Karimpuzha, which is the biggest tributary of the Chaliyar river in Kerala, India.

Punnappuzha is also known as Pandiyar when it flows through Tamil Nadu.

One branch of this river originate from northern slopes of Mukurthi National Park and another branch from Gudalur, in Nilagiri district of Tamil Nadu. These two branches join 5 km south-west of Gudalur town. When it reaches Edakkara, the river Maruthappuzha joins with it. Punnappuzha ends its course by merging with Karimpuzha one kilometer before the Karimpuzha bridge.

Nilambur, Vazhikkadavu, Chungathara and Edakkara are the major towns on the bank of Punnappuzha. There are bridges built at Kattadi, Muppini and Muttikkadavu across Punnappuzha.
