= Karakkodan puzha =

Karakkodan Puzha (കാരക്കോടന്‍ പുഴ) is a small river joining with Maruthappuzha which is a sub-tributary of Chaliyar, in Malappuram district. The river originates from the foothills of Nadukani forests near Gudalur. It pass through Vazhikkadavu panchayath and joins with Maruthappuzha near Munda.
