= Munderi =

Munderi may refer to:

- Munderi, Kannur, a census town and grama panchayat in Kannur district
- Munderi, Malappuram, a village in Malappuram district
