= Marutha, India =

Marutha
- town
- Nickname: Village of Gold Hills
- Location in Kerala, India Marutha (India)
- Coordinates: 11.42808°N 76.326807°E
- Country: India
- State: Kerala
- District: Malappuram
- Time zone: UTC+5:30 (IST)
- Postal code: 679333
- Telephone code: 04931
- Vehicle registration: KL 71

Marutha is a town in Nilambur taluk of Malappuram district. It is also known as village of Gold Hills. The tree Arjuna is also known as tree of "Marutha" and the place Lord Shiva appears as lingam under this Martha tree.

== Etymology ==
Marutha is an area encompassing locations such as Mundappoty, Kettungal, School Kunnu, Chakkappadam, Kanjirathingal, Vendekumpoty, Vengapadam, Mathalappara, Maruthakkadavu, and others. It is a part of Vazhikkadavu Panchayath and is recognized for its gold deposits along the banks of the Maruthappuzha River. Maruthappuzha originates from two streams originating from Devala and Pandalur, merging near Marutha (Randupuzhamukku). The last accessible point by bus is Manchakkoodu. Some buses end their routes at Chakkappadam, which retains the name Maruthakkadavu to attract passengers. Chakkappadam is the central hub for social services, government facilities, and community gatherings. The primary educational institution in the area is the Government High School at School Kunnu. The postal pin code is 679333.

Nearby towns are Palemad, Vazhikkadavu, Edakkara & Nilambur.

== Demographics ==
The population of Marutha is dominated by Muslims, Hindus (mostly Thiyya) and Christians.

== Culture ==
Marutha village is a predominantly Muslim populated area. Hindus exist in comparatively smaller numbers. So the culture of the locality is based upon Muslim traditions. Duff Muttu, Kolkali and Aravanamuttu are common folk arts of this locality. There are many libraries attached to mosques giving a rich source of Islamic studies. Most of the books are written in Arabi-Malayalam which is a version of the Malayalam language written in Arabic script. People gather in mosques for the evening prayer and continue to sit there after the prayers discussing social and cultural issues. Business and family issues are also sorted out during these evening meetings. The Hindu minority of this area keeps their rich traditions by celebrating various festivals in their temples. Hindu rituals are done here with a regular devotion like other parts of Kerala.

== Naxalite threat ==
In November 2016, three naxalites were killed near Karulai in an encounter with Kerala police. Naxalite leader Kappu Devaraj from Andhra Pradesh is included in the list of killed in the incident. Villages like Mundakkadavu, Kalkullam and Uchakkulam near Karulai have been threatened by Naxalite attacks. Naxalites visit the locality regularly and ask for food and shelter from the tribals. The police are also combing the area regularly but have not arrested any naxalites. On 27 September 2016, there was firing between the Maoists and the Kerala police in this area and no one was injured in this incident.

== Transportation ==
Marutha village connects to other parts of India through Nilambur town. State Highway No.28 starts from Nilambur and connects to Ooty, Mysore and Bangalore through Highways.12,29 and 181. National highway No.66 passes through Ramanattukara and the northern stretch connects to Goa and Mumbai. The southern stretch connects to Cochin and Trivandrum. State. The nearest airport is at Karipur. The nearest major railway station is at Feroke.

== Gold deposits ==
Marutha is known for its Gold deposits, and the soil of Marutha contains the gold in its pure form. People used to filter the gold from the soil from the late seventies to the late nineties. It was the livelihood of the village men during those days. During the filtration process, people used to dig huge holes in the surrounding mountains of Marutha and collect the soil, which contained a high concentration of gold. Interestingly, it is a live scenario that you can see, even today – after a heavy rainfall, most of the Maruthites still look downwards in search of gold nuggets in the soil, which is cleared by heavy water streams.
