= Amarambalam =

Amarambalam (Pookkottumpadam)
- village
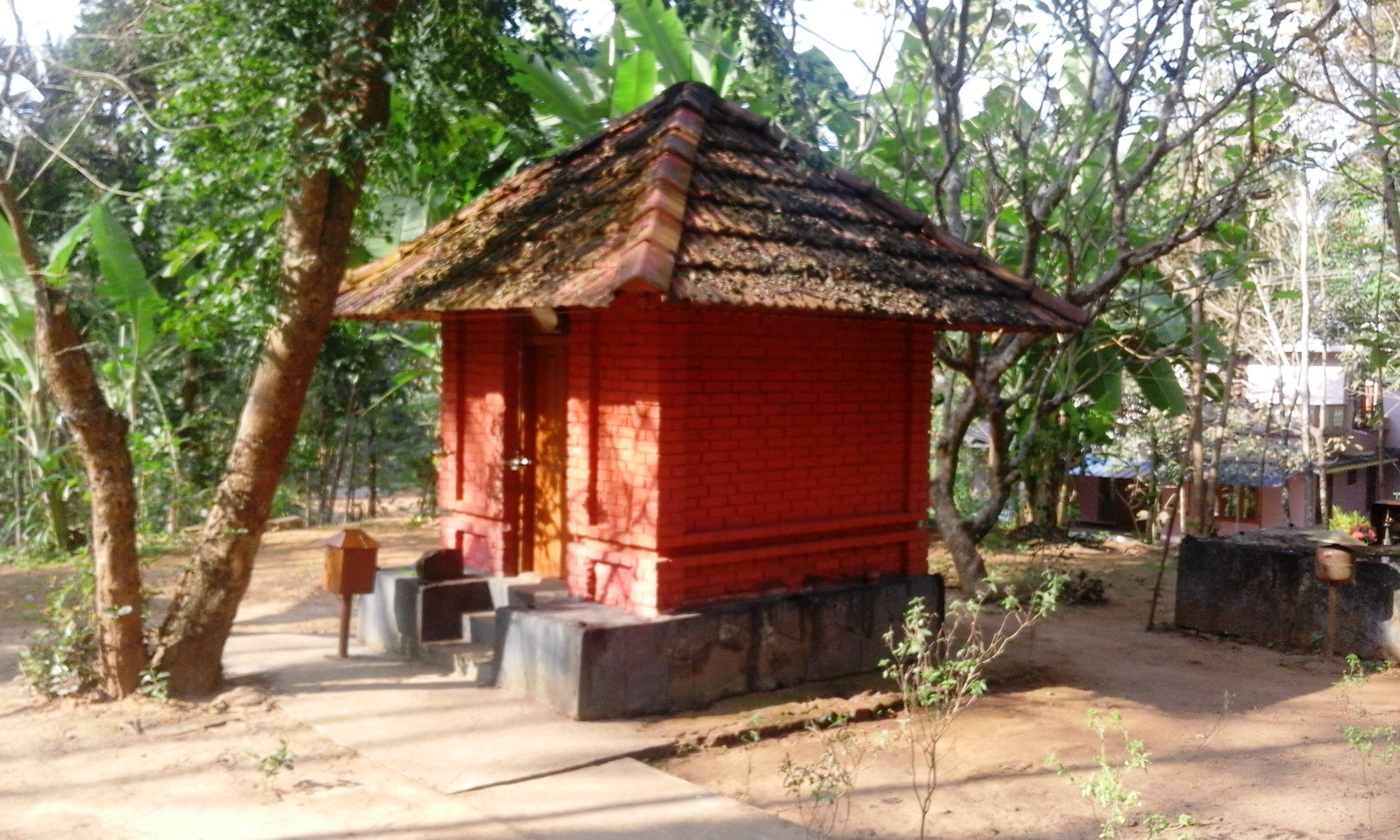
- Temple at T.K.Colony

- Location in Kerala, India Amarambalam (Pookkottumpadam) (India)
- Coordinates: 11°14′0″N 76°11′0″E
- Country: India
- State: Kerala
- District: Malappuram

Languages
  - Official: Malayalam, English
- Time zone: UTC+5:30 (IST)
- Vehicle registration: KL-
- Coastline: 0 kilometres (0 mi)

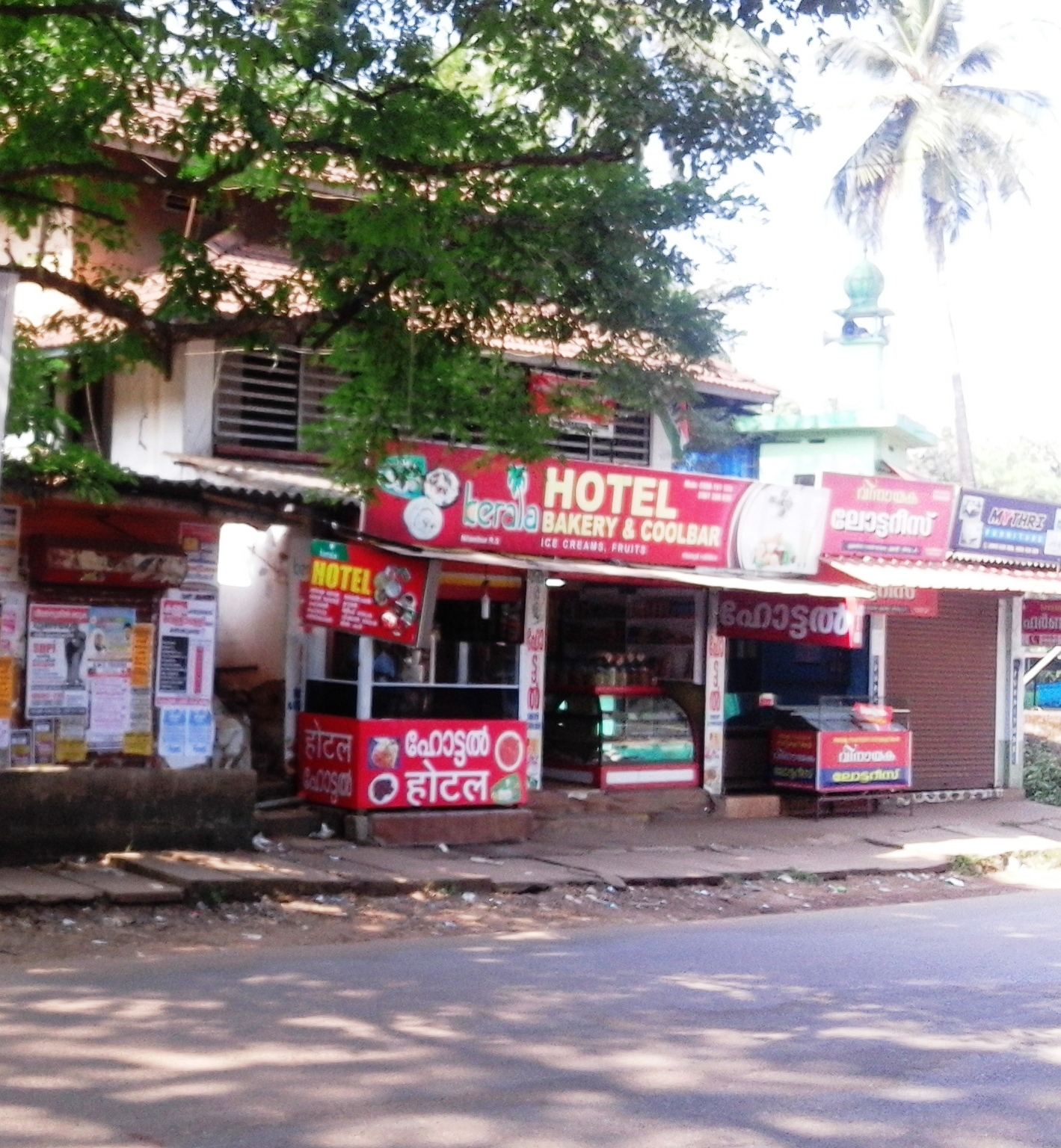
Amarabalam Road

Amarambalam is a forest village near Nilambur town and conjoins Silent Valley National Park. The main town in Amarambalam is Pookkoottumpadam, located in the Malappuram district of the Indian state of Kerala. It is an emerging commercial hub and one of the fastest-growing towns in Nilambur Taluk. The town area is 265.72 km^{2}. Altitude rises sharply from 40 to 2,554 m.

== New Amarambalam Reserved Forest ==
The New Amarambalam Reserved Forest is noted for 10 species of threatened or restricted bird species including: lesser adjutant (Leptoptilos javanicus), white-rumped vulture (Gyps bengalensis), Nilgiri wood-pigeon (Columba elphinstonii) Malabar parakeet (Psittacula columboides) Malabar grey-hornbill (Ocyceros griseus), white-bellied treepie (Dendrocitta leucogastra), grey-headed bulbul (Pycnonotus priocephalus), rufous babbler (Turdoides subrufus), white-bellied blue-flycatcher (Cyornis pallipes) and crimson-backed sunbird (Nectarinia minima).

== Villages and Suburbs ==
- Thondiyil and Koottampara
- Chelode, Mannathipoyil & Mampata
- Naripoyil, Thottekkad and Pookkottumpadam
- Chettippadam, Pariyangad and Pottikkallu
- Thelpara, Antonykkadu and T.K.Colony

http://www.mathrubhumi.com/news/kerala/nilambur-maoist-malayalam-news-1.1529750

== Naxalite threat ==
In November 2016, three Naxalites were killed near Karulai in an encounter with Kerala police. Naxalite leader Kappu Devaraj from Andhra Pradesh is included in the list of killed in the incident. Villages like Mundakkadavu, Kalkullam and Uchakkulam near Karulai are threatened by Naxalite attacks. Naxalites visit the locality regularly and ask for food and shelter from the tribals. The police are also combing the area regularly but have not arrested any Naxalites. On 27 September 2016, there was firing between the Maoists and the Kerala police in this area and no one was injured in this incident.

== Tourist attractions ==
- Waterfall at T.K.Colony
- T K colony view point
- Kathir Farm,
- Kotta Puzha gives you natural

and refreshing bath

== Transportation ==
Amarambalam village connects to other parts of India through Nilambur town. State Highway No.28 starts from Nilambur and connects to Ooty, Mysore and Bangalore through Highways.12,29 and 181. National highway No.66 passes through Ramanattukara and the northern stretch connects to Goa and Mumbai. The southern stretch connects to Cochin and Trivandrum. State. The nearest airport is at Kozhikode. The nearest major railway station is at Nilambur Road railway station.

== Picture Gallery ==
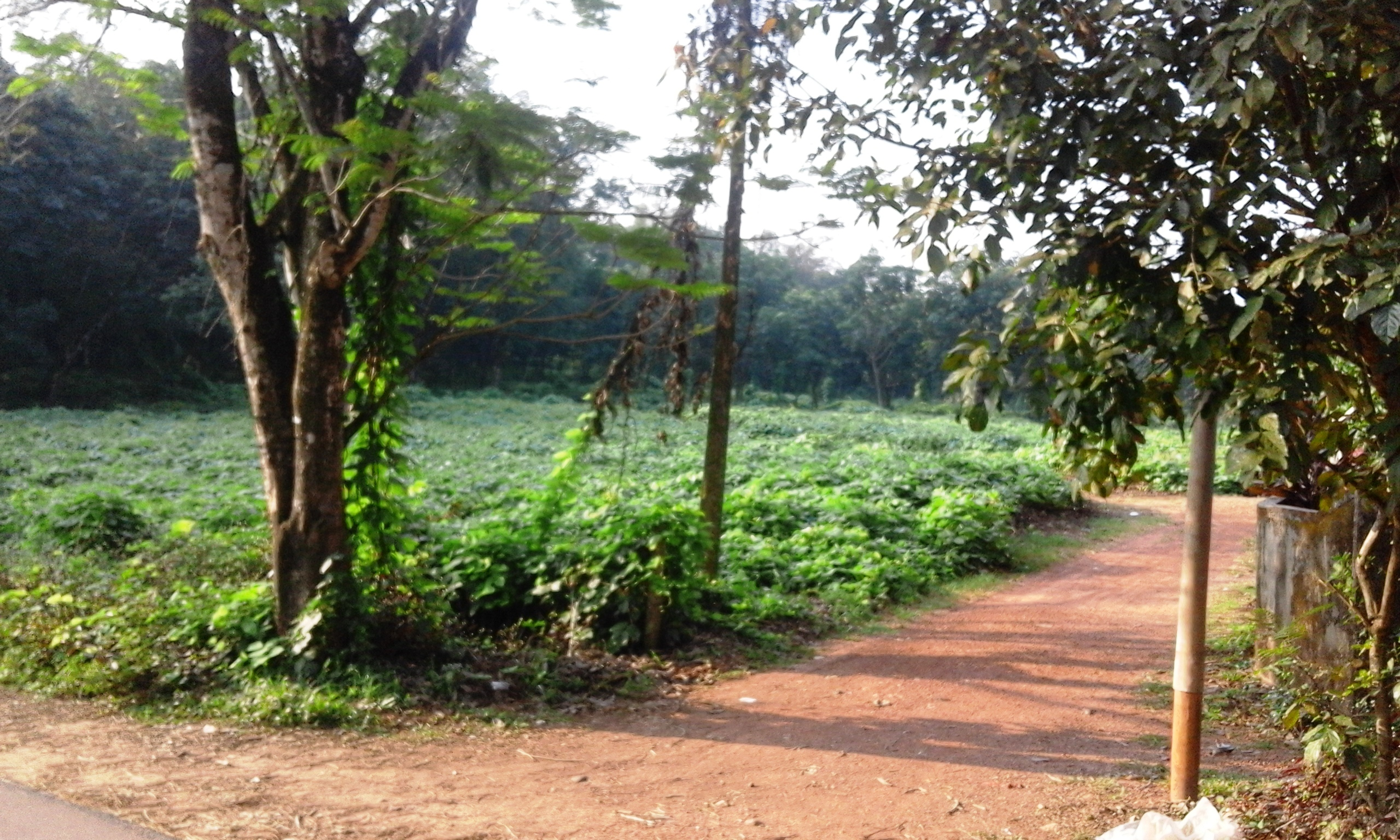
Thottekkad, T.K.Colony Road

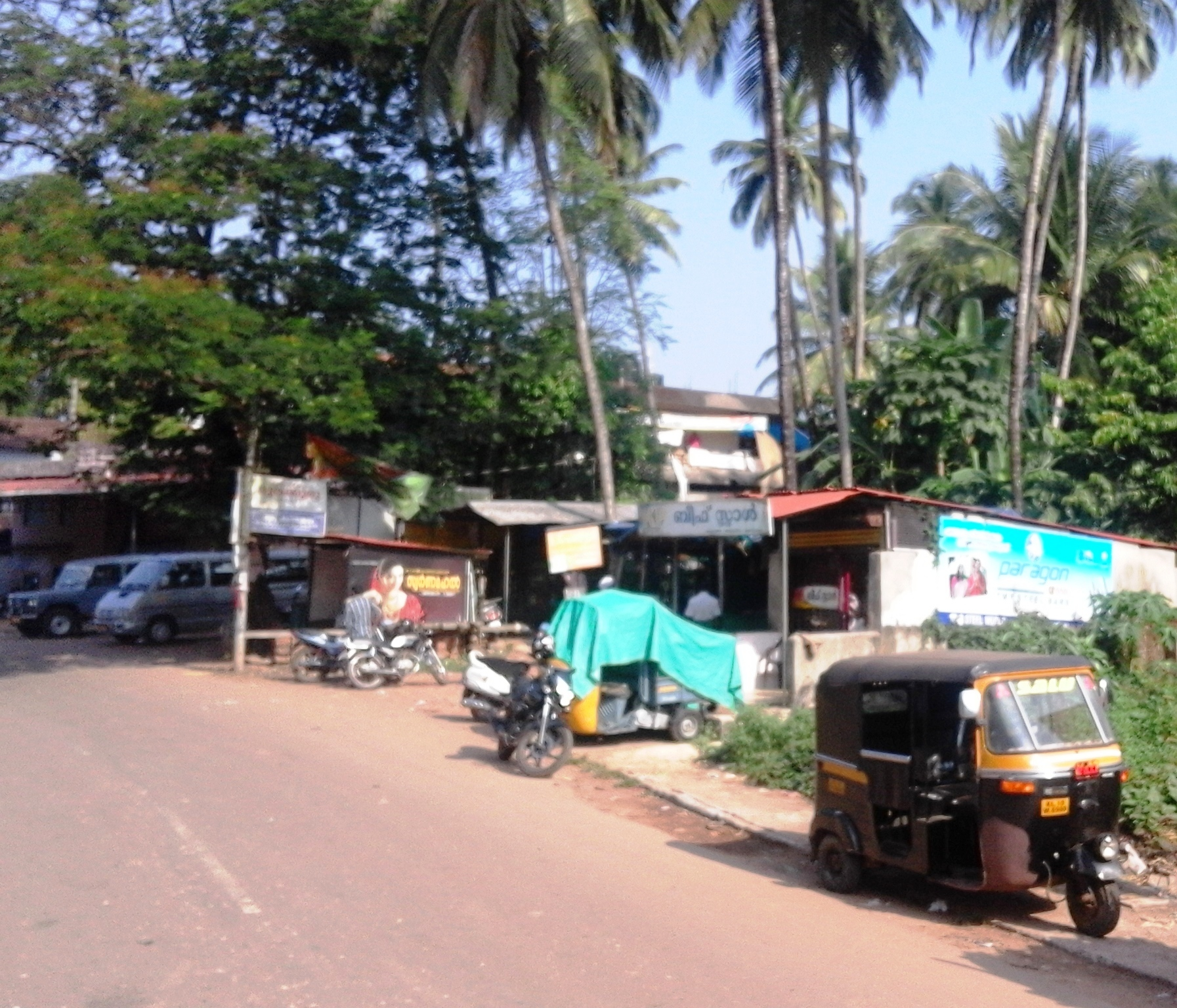
Pookkotumpadam, T.K.Colony Road

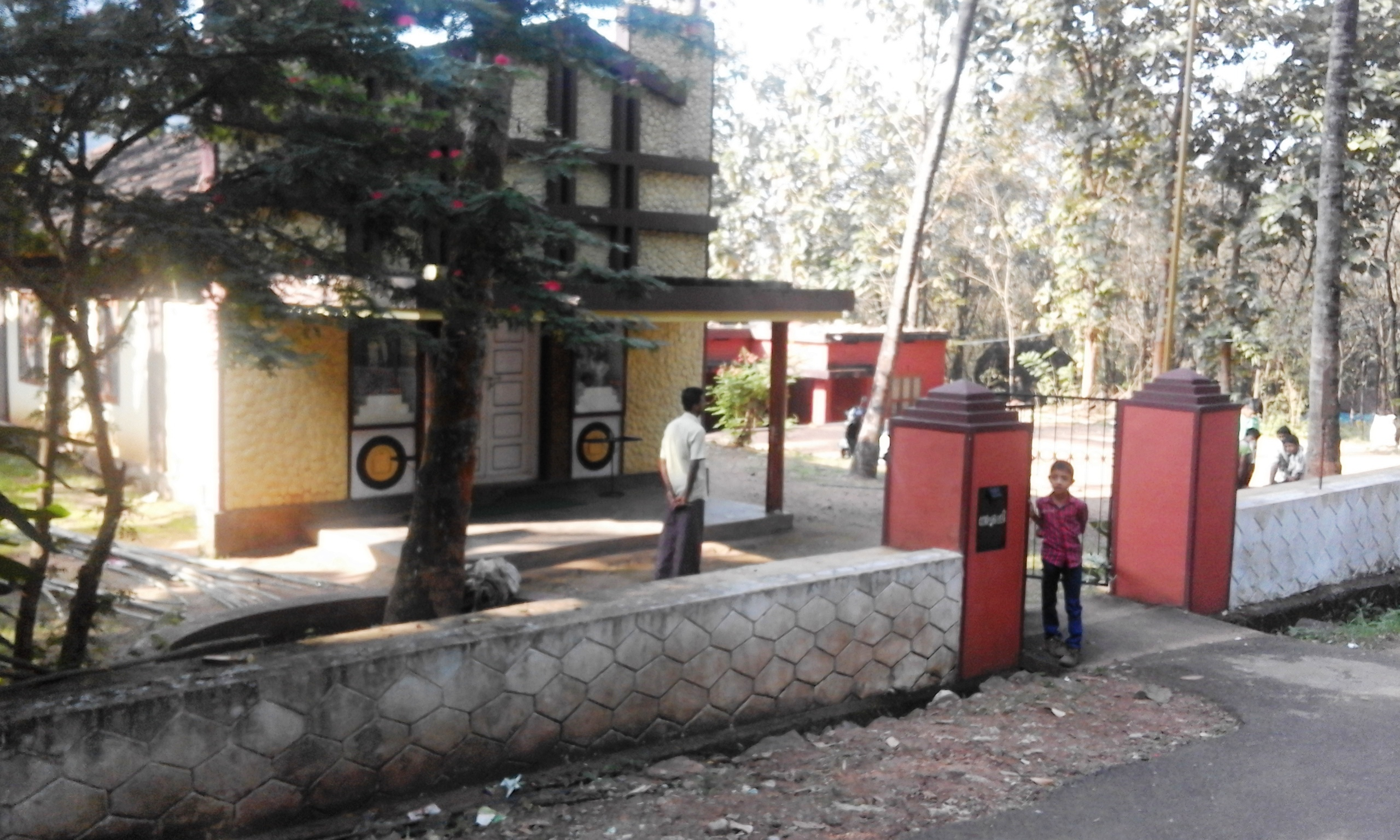
Church in T.K.Colony

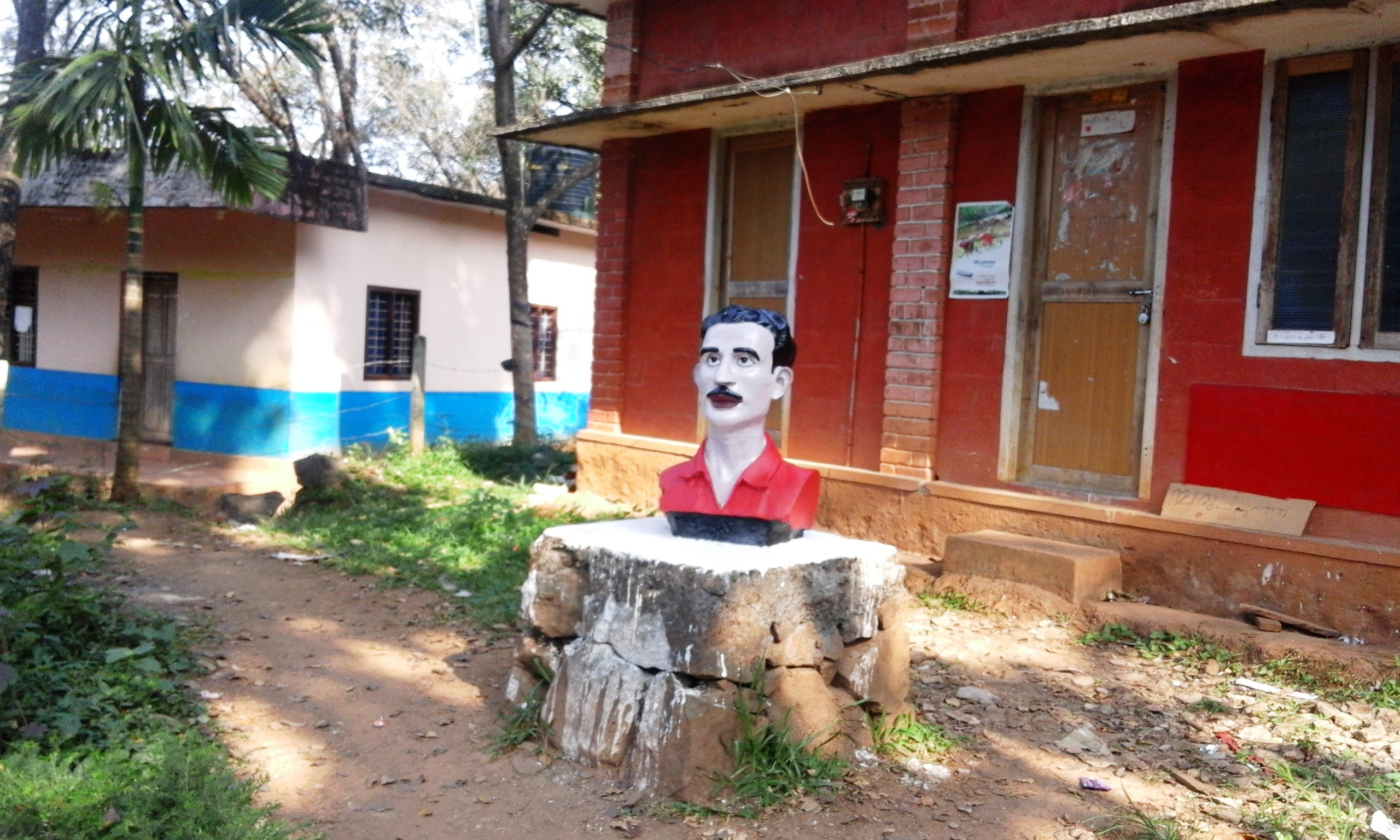
Communist Office, T.K.Colony

Grey Headed Bulbul
