= P. V. Anvar =

Indian politician (born 1967)

Puthanveettil Anvar (born 26 May 1967) is an Indian politician and who was a member of the Kerala Legislative Assembly representing Nilambur constituency from 2016 until his resignation on 13 January 2025.

== Biography ==
P. V. Anvar was born in Malappuram district on 26 May 1967, the fourth son of P. V. Shoukath Ali and Mariyumma. Puthanveettil family is one of the ancient families of Malabar which was very close to the Indian National Congress from the great struggle for independence on. Anvar completed his schooling at Malabar Christian College School, Kozhikode, and moved to MES Mampad College, Malappuram where he did his graduation in Economics. He was the college union chairman during his period. After his studies, as an entrepreneur he started Crushers which has grown into one of the prominent crushers in Malabar. He contested from Eranad constituency as an independent candidate and came second in the run in the assembly elections in 2011.

== Political career ==
P. V. Anvar hails from a family of Indian National Congress followers. He was the college union chairman, and a representative of the Kerala Students Union, the student wing of INC, during his college life. He contested from Eranad constituency as an independent candidate in the assembly elections 2011. In 2014 Lok Sabha election, he contested as an independent candidate from Wayanad Lok Sabha constituency.

In the 2016 Assembly elections, Anvar contested as a Left Democratic Front (LDF) candidate and elected from Nilambur constituency, defeating Aryadan Shoukath of Congress. In 2019 Lok Sabha election, he contested as LDF candidate from Ponnani Lok Sabha constituency. In the 2021 Assembly elections, Anvar again contested as LDF candidate and election from Nilambur constituency, defeating V. V. Prakash of the Indian National Congress.

In May 2018, a probe report by Kozhikode district administration accused P. V. Anvar of illegal construction at his theme park in Kakkadampoyil. Kozhikode District Collector P. V. Thomas accused Anvar of carrying out unauthorised construction at the theme park. The Kerala State Disaster Management Authority issued a stop memo to the park in June 2018, due to illegal construction. Revenue department ordered to demolish the illegal check dam constructed by P. V. Anvar for the water theme park. Anvar objected to it and moved to court against the order. But in April 2019, the High Court ordered immediate demolition of the illegal check dam. It has been claimed that the illegal constructions done by P. V. Anvar accentuated the vagaries caused due to the 2018 Kerala floods.

In April 2019, Anvar accused the Communist Party of India (CPI), whose ministers held the Revenue and Forest departments in Kerala Government, of trying to destroy his business ventures, by taking legal actions against his water theme park. CPI protested strongly against his remarks.

In February 2021, there was huge social media uproar against an Africa visit of P. V. Anvar. A section of netizens came out flooding the comment section of President of Ghana, Nana Akufo-Addo's Facebook page with sarcastic meme demanding release of P. V. Anvar from Ghana jail. Later P. V. Anvar came out with a clarification in social media that he is at Sierra Leone for business activities.

In August 2024, P.V. Anvar has made serious allegations against some top IPS officers, including M.R. Ajith Kumar, the Additional Director General of Police (ADGP) for Law and Order. He accused them of being involved in gold smuggling, illegally accumulating wealth, and sabotaging the Thrissur Pooram festival. The Chief Minister has assured that necessary actions will be taken based on the investigation’s findings.

On 6 October 2024, Anwar formed a new political party called Democratic Movement of Kerala. Later it merged with Trinamool Congress (AITC) and he resigned MLA position. Anwar created new alliance with support of Aam Admi Party, with his party (All India Trinamool Congress) as the leader of the alliance. The new alliance has been named JPPM. He later joined UDF as an associate member and contested from Beypore Assembly constituency in the 2026 Kerala Legislative Assembly election. After the elections, he left the Trinamool Congress accusing the party to have not been a part of his campaign in Beypore and thus declared that he will form a new political party having ideologies shared by Rahul Gandhi.
