= Aryadan Muhammed =

Indian politician (1935–2022)

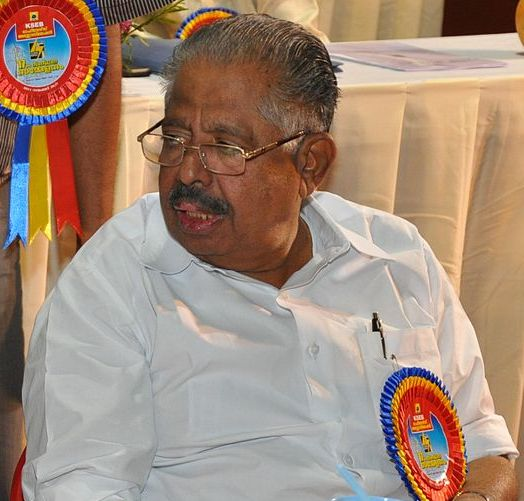

Former Minister for Electricity, Government of Kerala
- In office 23 May 2011 – 19 May 2016
- Governor: H. R. Bhardwaj
- Chief minister: Oommen Chandy
- Preceded by: A. K. Balan
- Constituency: Nilambur, Malappuram district

Minister for Transport, Government of Kerala
- In office 12 April 2012 – 01 January 2014
- Preceded by: V. S. Sivakumar
- Succeeded by: Thiruvanchoor Radhakrishnan

Personal details
- Born: 15 May 1935 Nilambur, Madras Presidency, British India
- Died: 25 September 2022 (aged 87) Kozhikode, Kerala, India
- Party: Indian National Congress
- Spouse: Mariyumma
- Children: Two sons and two daughters, including Aryadan Shoukath
- As of 8 November, 2012 Source: kerala.gov.in

Aryadan Muhammed (15 May 1935 – 25 September 2022) was an Indian National Congress party leader who served as Minister for Electricity and Transport (Government of Kerala) in the Oommen Chandy Ministry. He represented the Nilambur constituency in Kerala until 2016, being elected for the eighth time in the 2011 State Election.

== Personal life ==
Aryadan Muhammed was born in Nilambur on 15 May 1935 as the son of Unneen and Kadiyamunni. He married Mariyumma and had two sons and two daughters. He died on 25 September 2022, aged 87 while he was undergoing treatment at a private hospital in Kozhikode.

== Political life ==
Entering politics as an Indian National congress member in 1952, Muhammed, a member of the Kerala Pradesh Congress Committee (KPCC) since 1958, later served as Secretary, Calicut DCC, President, Malappuram DCC and as General Secretary, KPCC. An active member of the Indian National Trade Union Congress (INTUC) in the fifties, he has been the President of various labour unions as well.

Muhammed was elected to the Kerala Legislative Assembly (KLA) for the first time in 1977. He was elected again in 1980 through a by-election. From the 8th KLA to the 13th KLA (1987, 1991, 1996, 2001, 2006, 2011) he represented the same Nilambur Constituency as a Congress candidate.

== State minister ==
From January 1980 to October 1981, Muhammed was the Minister for Labour and Forests in the Ministry headed by E. K. Nayanar. Later, from April 1995 to May 1996, he was the Minister for Labour and Tourism in the Ministry headed by A. K. Antony. In the Ministry headed by Oommen Chandy (2004–2006) he held the portfolio of Electricity from September 2004.

Muhammed was the Minister for Power and Transport in the second Oommen Chandy Ministry from 2011 to 2016. His portfolio included Electricity, Railways, Post and Telegraphs, Road Transport, Motor Vehicles and Water Transport.

Major Election Victories in KLA
Year	Constituency	Closest rival	Majority (votes)
1977	Nilambur	Saidalikutty (CPI(M))	7,715
1980	Nilambur	M.R Chandran (INC(I))	17,841
1987	Nilambur	Devdas Pottekkad (CPI(M))	10,333
1991	Nilambur	Abdurahiman Master (IND)	7,684
1996	Nilambur	Prof. Thomas Matheew (IND)	6,693
2001	Nilambur	P. Anwar Master (IND)	21,620
2006	Nilambur	Sreerama Krishnan (CPI(M))	18,171
2011	Nilambur	Prof. M. Thomas Mathew (IND)	5,598

Other positions held

- Muhammed also served as the Chairman of the Public Accounts Committee from 1998 to 2001 and Chairman of Public Undertakings Committee from 2001 to 2004
- In addition, he has held important positions in the State Marketing Federation as its president and was the Director of NCDC and NAFED.
- During the Xth KLA, he was for a time Secretary of the Congress Parliamentary Party.

== See also ==
- Kerala Ministers
