= Aryadan Shoukath =

Indian politician, screenwriter (born 1965)

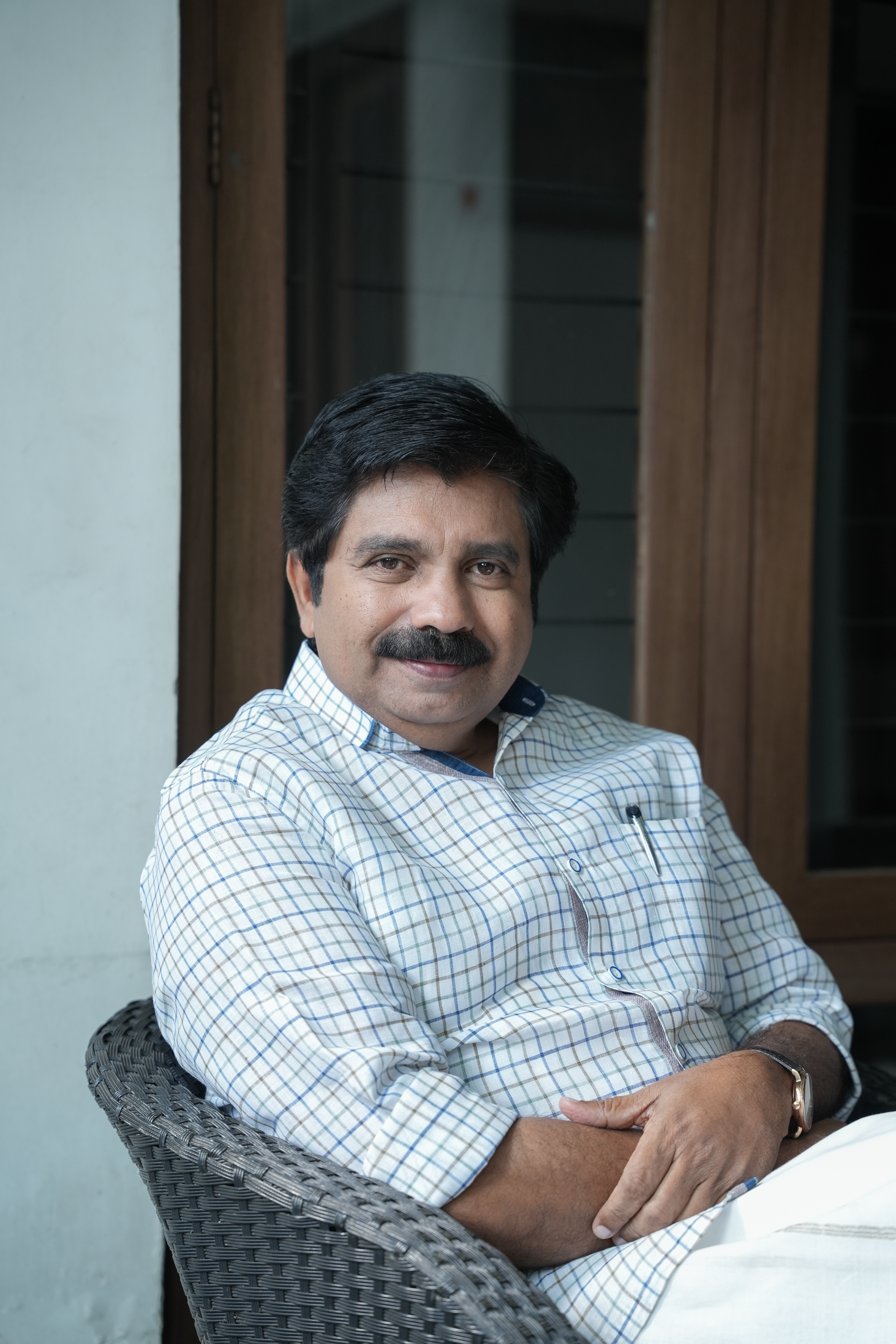
- Aryadan Shoukath in 2026

Member of Kerala Legislative Assembly
- Incumbent
- Assumed office 23 June 2025
- Preceded by: P. V. Anvar
- Constituency: Nilambur

Personal details
- Born: 4 March 1965 (age 61) Nilambur, Kerala, India
- Party: Indian National Congress
- Parent(s): Aryadan Muhammed (father), Mariyumma (mother)
- Occupation: MLA Nilambur: Film producer; Screenwriter; Politician; Social Worker
- Known for: Social-themed cinema, political activism
- Awards: National Film Award; Kerala State Film Awards

Aryadan Shoukath (born 4 March 1965) is an Indian politician from the Indian National Congress, currently serving as the Member of the Legislative Assembly (MLA) representing the Nilambur Assembly constituency. He was elected as a member of the Legislative Assembly in the Nilambur Legislative Assembly by-election held on June 19, 2025, defeating M. Swaraj of the CPM.

He is also an award winning screen writer and film producer of Malayalam films.

== Early life and education ==
Shoukath was born in Nilambur, in the Malappuram district of Kerala, to Aryadan Muhammed, a prominent Congress leader and former Minister for Electricity and Transport (Government of Kerala) in the Oommen Chandy Ministry, and Mariyumma. His family's involvement in politics had a significant influence on his career path from an early age. He is known to be married with children. He has an active social media presence, including on Instagram. He is a degree holder in Bachelor of Science (B.Sc.) in Zoology from Mar Ivanios College.

He was active in student politics through the Kerala Students Union (KSU), the student wing of the Indian National Congress and became the School leader at Nilambur Government Manavedan High School.

== Political career ==
Shoukath has been an active member of the Indian National Congress. He contested the 2005 Kerala local elections and won at Pathippara Gram panchayat election, defeating Prakash Arimbra of CPM. He contested the 2016 Kerala Legislative Assembly election from Nilambur but lost to P.V. Anvar by 11,504 votes. Earlier, he served as chairman of Nilambur municipality and held various local governance positions. He was also the General Secretary of the Kerala Pradesh Congress Committee (KPCC). In January 2025, he was involved in a public dispute with P.V. Anvar, defending his political standing within the party. In June 2025 by-elections in Kerala, he defeated CPI(M)'s M Swaraj by 11,077 votes to win the Nilambur Assembly constituency.

=== 2025 by-election ===
==== By political party ====
2025 by-election: Nilambur
Party	Candidate	Votes	%	±%
INC	Aryadan Shoukath	77,737	44.17	▼1.17
CPI(M)	M. Swaraj	66,660	37.88	▼9.02
AITC	P. V. Anvar	19,760	11.23	▲11.23
BJP	Mohan George	8,648	4.91	▼0.05
SDPI	Sadik Naduthodi	2,075	1.18	▼0.71
NOTA	None of the above	630	0.36	
Majority		11,077	6.29	
Turnout		175,989	75.27%	
INC gain from Independent		Swing		

=== Political positions held ===
- KSU Ernad Taluk Secretary
- Youth Congress Malappuram District secretary
- Malappuram DCC President
- KPCC General Secretary

=== Other positions held ===
- Kerala Deshiya Vedhi District president
- Rajiv Gandhi Panchayati raj Sangathan national convener
- Nilambur Grama panchayat president - (2005-2010)
- Nilambur Municipality chairman - (2010-2015)

=== Controversies ===
In November 2023, he faced disciplinary action for organizing a pro-Palestine rally contrary to party directives.

== Film career ==
Shoukath entered the film industry as a producer and screenwriter with the film Paadam Onnu: Oru Vilapam in 2003, where he critiqued the treatment of girls' education within the Muslim community. This film was not only commercially successful but also critically acclaimed, earning him the National Film Award for Best Film on Family Welfare.

He continued to produce and write:

- **Vilapangalkkappuram** (2008) - A narrative about a girl's escape from the anti-Muslim riots in Gujarat. - **Daivanamathil** (2005) - Addressing issues of religious extremism. - **Varthamanam** (2021) - Tackling contemporary socio-political issues.

His films are recognized for their social commentary, aiming to enlighten and reform through storytelling.

== Awards and recognition ==
- National Film Award
  - National Film Award for Best Film on Family Welfare : 2003 - Paadam Onnu: Oru Vilapam
  - Nargis Dutt Award for Best Feature Film on National Integration : 2005 - Daivanamathil
- Kerala State Film Awards
  - Kerala State Film Award for Second Best Film : 2003 - Paadam Onnu: Oru Vilapam
  - Kerala State Film Award for Best Story: 2003 - Paadam Onnu: Oru Vilapam
  - Kerala State Film Award for Best Story: 2008 - Vilapangalkkappuram
