= Punnapuzha River =

River in India

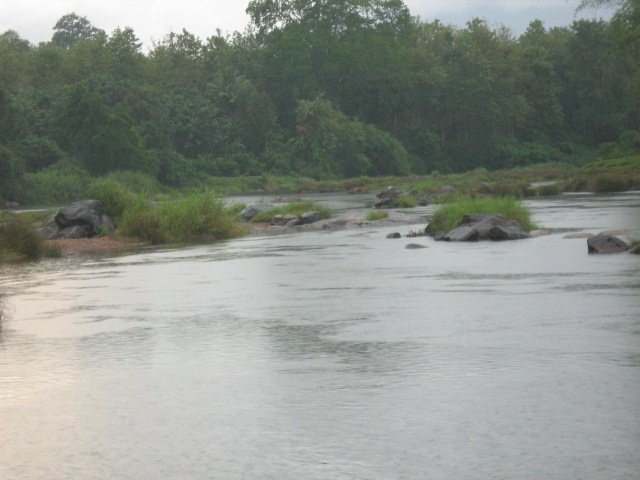
Punnapuzha river

Punnapuzha River is one of the tributaries of the Chaliyar River.

The Chaliyar River is the fourth longest river in Kerala, south India at 169 km in length.

In August 2025, the Kerala government sanctioned about Rs.195 crore for clearance of debris along an 8-km stretch of Punnapuzha river following the landslides of 2024. The Bailey bridge on the river near connects Mundakkai and Chooralmala.

== See also ==
- Chaliyar River - Main river
