= Karimpuzha (Malappuram) =

River in Kerala, India

Coordinates: 11°18′N 76°16′E

Karimpuzha is the largest tributary of Chaliyar river, Kerala, India. It is very near to Nilambur.

Karimpuzha originates from western slopes between Mukurthi peak and Avalanche Dam in Nilgiris district of Tamil Nadu. Cherupuzha, which joins with Karimpuzha near Karulai, originates from the forests north-west of Upper Bhavani reservoir in Nilgiris district of Tamil Nadu. Karimpuzha joins with Chaliyar at Chaliyarmukku, near Nilambur. Karimpuzha carries Punnappuzha and its tributaries. Punnappuzha joins Karimpuzha near Karimpuzha bridge.
