= Karulai =

Karulai God's own village
- village
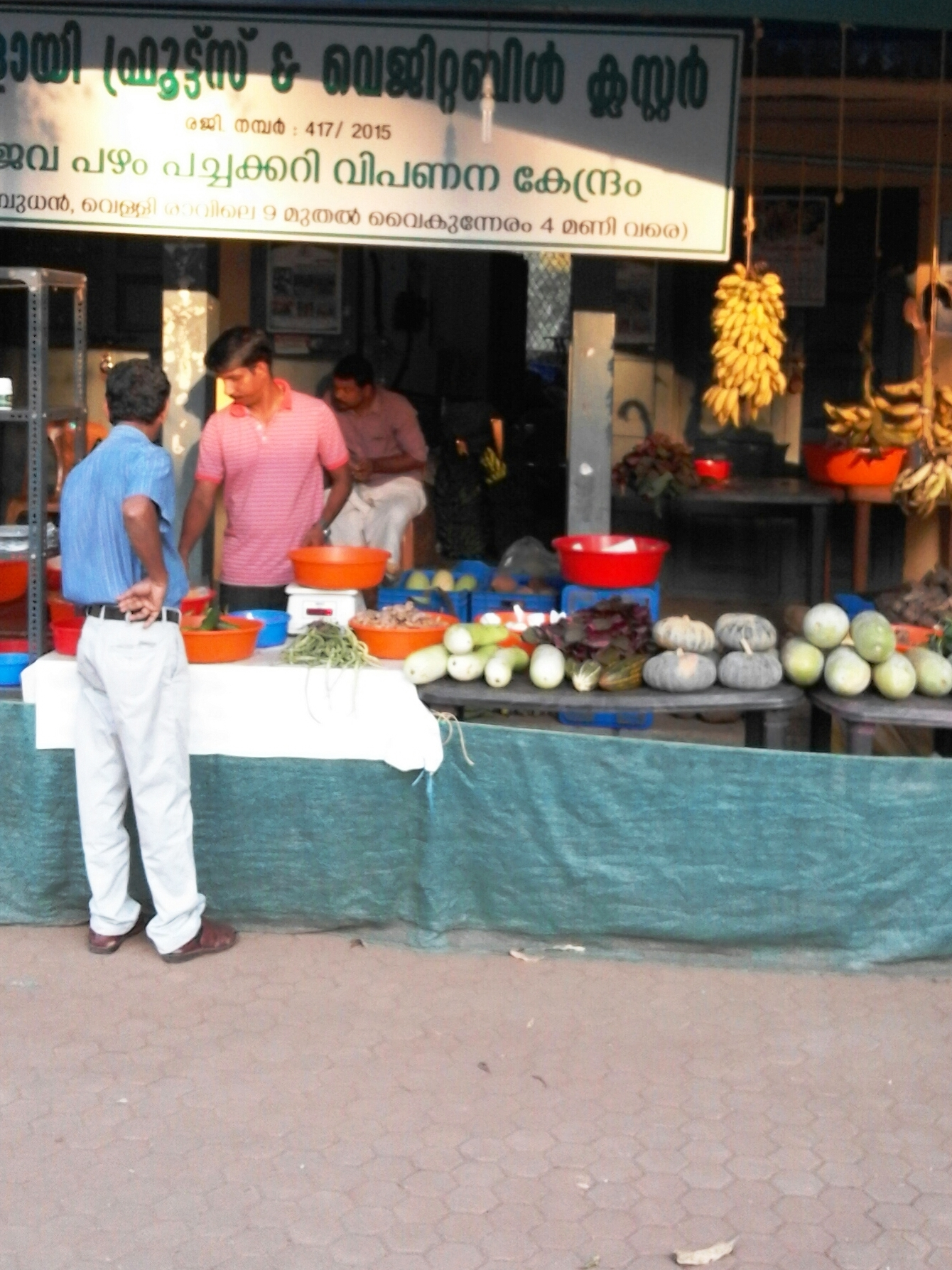
- Government run vegetable shop in Karulai
- Interactive map of Karulai
- Coordinates: 11.287592°N 76.296766°E
- Country: India
- State: Kerala
- District: Malappuram

Languages
  - Official: Malayalam, English
- Time zone: UTC+5:30 (IST)
- Telephone code: 04931

Karulai is a small town and panchayath in Nilambur Taluk of Malappuram district.It is situated on the banks of the Karimpuzha River. Edakkara, Nilambur, Pookkottumpadam, and Vaniyambalam are the nearest towns.

== Tourist attraction ==
Karulai is the "gods' own village" in Kerala with green forest, and has a variety of animals, plant and fish species in the River Karimpuzha. A considerable area of the Karulai village is forest which includes the Nedumkayam Rainforest. Karulai has a very low population density and majority of the population lives near bus stands because of a large number of forest areas. This village is home to over 20,000 inhabitants.

== Nedumkayam ==
Nedumkayam is 14km from Nilambur town, in Malappuram district, Kerala, India. Nedumkayam is noted especially for its rich rain forests. The wooden resthouse built here by the British offers a panoramic view of the elephant and deer grazing in the forest nearby. One has to get prior permission from the Indian Forest Service to enter the forest zone. Heavy restrictions are imposed as a measure to save the existing forest land. An elephant taming center is also located here. Nilambur including Nedumkayam has been selected for being developed as Kerala's second ecotourism destination. It is very beautiful and very good tourist center. There is a huge demand for the last several years to create the Nilambur - Karulai - Silent Valley - Coimbatore road. Nedumkayam rainforest is a part of Nilgiri's Biosphere Reserve. People rave about the fresh air and clear water that flows through, along with rare species of flora and fauna, and this is home to almost all of the mammals in western ghats and more than 200 species of birds hence classifying it as an important bird area.

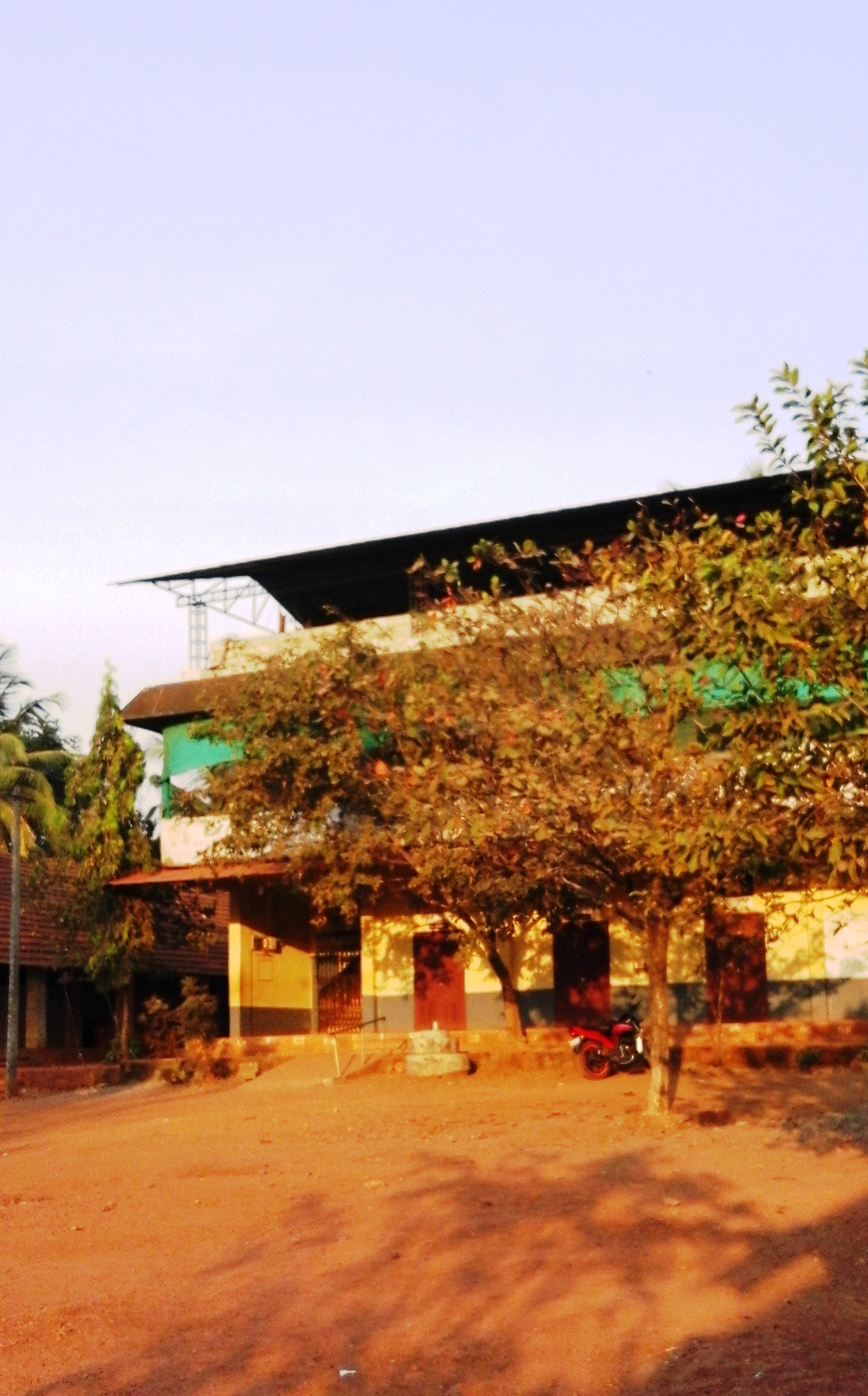
Kunhamutty School, Karulayi, Nilambur

=== Road distances ===
- Nilambur to Karulayi. 10km
- Karulayi to Nedungayam. 7km
- karulai to pookottumpadam 9km
- karulai to Edakkara 9km

== Naxalite threat ==
On 24 November 2016, three Naxalites were killed in an encounter with Kerala police. Naxalite leader Kappu Devaraj from Andhra Pradesh is included in the list of killed in the incident. Villages like Mundakkadavu, Kalkullam and Uchakkulam near Karulai are threatened by Naxalite attacks. Naxalites visit the locality regularly and ask for food and shelter from the tribals. The police are also combing the area regularly but have not arrested any Naxalites. On 27 September 2016, there was firing between the Maoists and the Kerala police in this area and no one was injured in this incident.

== Tribal villages ==
- Nedumkayam
- Mancheeri
- Mundakkadavu
- Uchakkulam
- Kalkkulam

== Villages and suburbs ==
- Chandakkunnu, Mukkatta and VEllappuzha
- Mutheeri, Nallamthanni Pulliyil and valavu
- Mailampara. Varikkal. Chettiyil. Kottuppara.
- Cherupuzha, ambalappadi

== Important landmarks ==
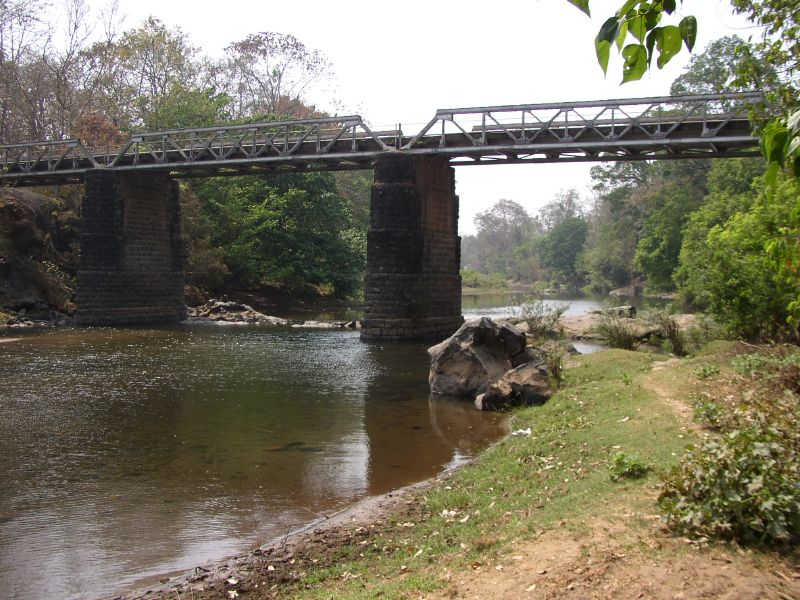
Nedungayam Bridge

- Hayathul Islam Madrasa, Pilakkal
- Kottayil book house karulai
- Tharbiyathul Ouladh Madhrassa
- Kunhamutty Memorial Higher Secondary School
- Organic Vegetable Cluster, Krishi Bhavan
- Karulayi Panchayath Office, School Road.
- Town Juma Masjid
- SYS. SSF. Karulai. Sector . S B S.
- karulai juma masjid Pallipadi
- SKSSF town unit Pallipadi
- Nambola footwear karulai
- M D I Public School Karulai
- Burma Petrolium Pallippadi. Karulai.
- Jubilee Medicals. Karulai.
- Fazil -E- Omar Public School
