= Chungathara =

Chungathara Chungathara
- village
- Interactive map of Chungathara
- Coordinates: 11.33364°N 76.275678°E
- Country: India
- State: Kerala
- District: Malappuram

Area
  - Total: 129.69 km^{2} (50.07 sq mi)

Population
  - Total: 44,569 (According to census data 2,001)
  - Density: 343.66/km^{2} (890.07/sq mi)

Languages
  - Official: Malayalam, English
- Time zone: UTC+5:30 (IST)
- PIN: 679334
- Telephone code: 04931
- Vehicle registration: KL-71
- Coastline: 0 kilometres (0 mi)
- Nearest city: Edakkara
- Lok Sabha constituency: Waynad
- Climate: Tropical monsoon (Köppen)
- Avg. summer temperature: 35 °C (95 °F)
- Avg. winter temperature: 20 °C (68 °F)
- Website: http://lsgkerala.in/chungatharapanchayat/

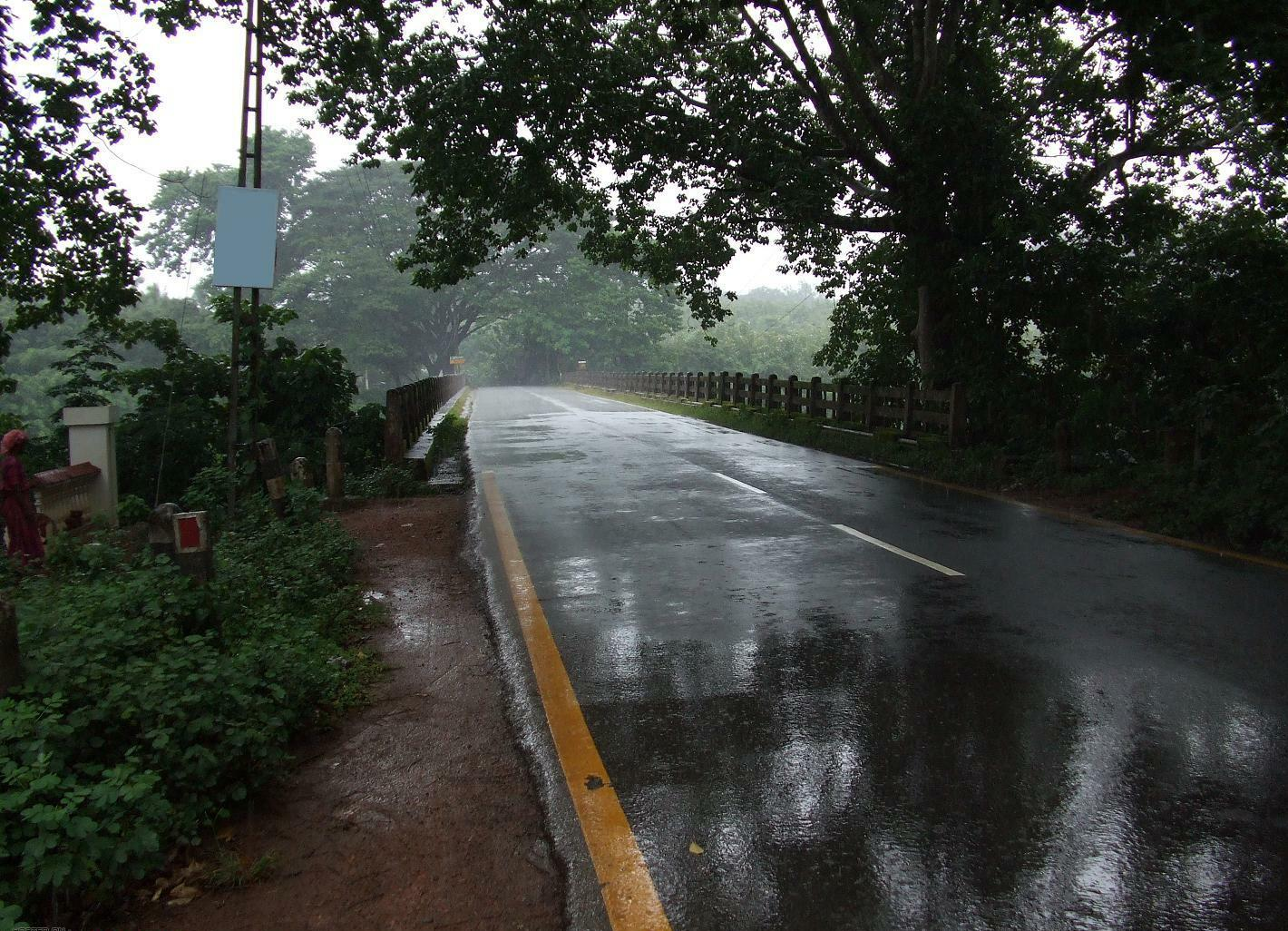
Karimpuzha Bridge in monsoon

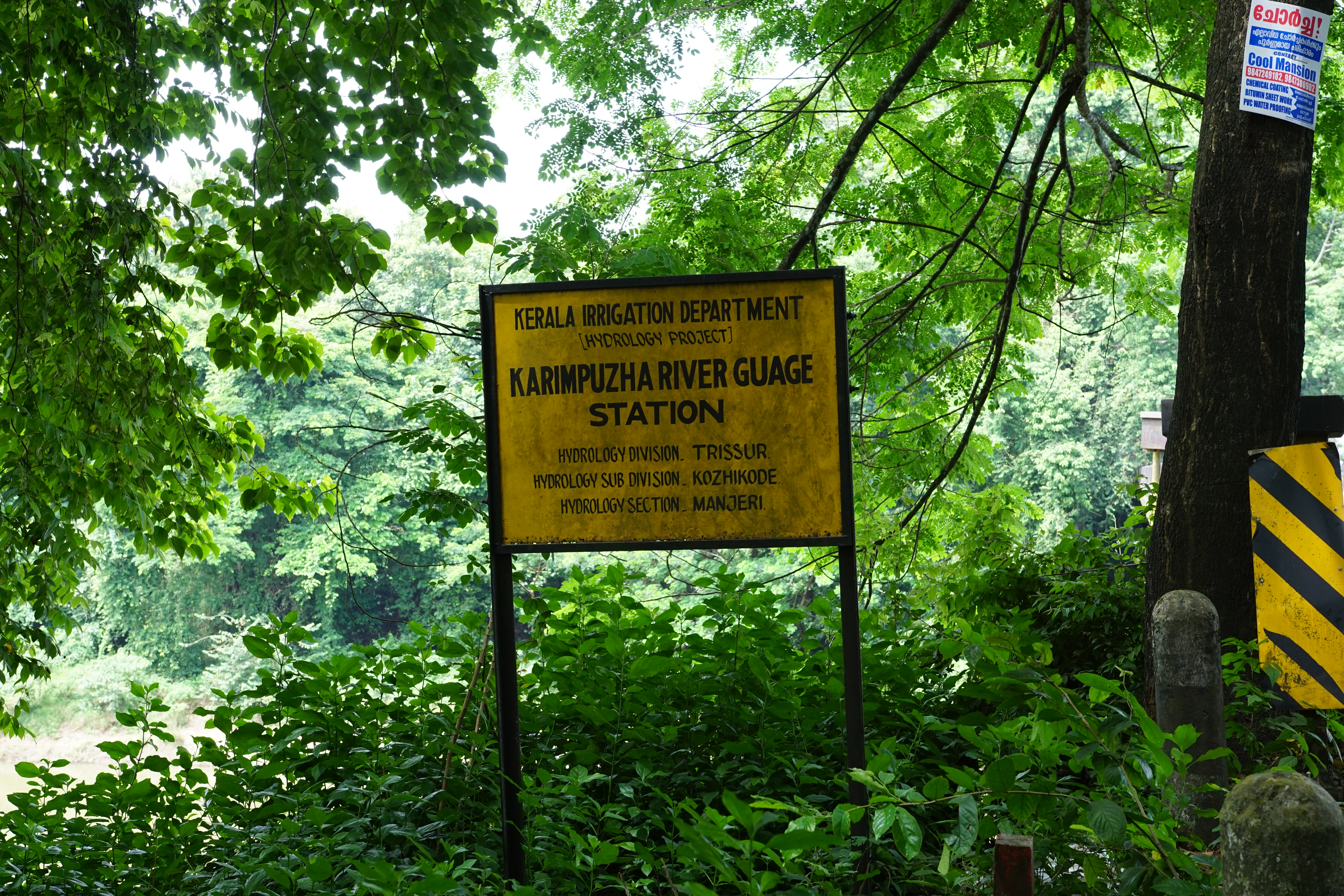
Karimpuzha River Gauge Station

Chungathara is a village panchayat in Nilambur Taluk in Malappuram district, Kerala, India. It is one of the smallest gramapnachayat in Kerala. It is surrounded by Western Ghats.

== Geography ==
Two rivers, Chaliyar and Punnappuzha, pass through this village.

== Transportation ==
The Nilambur - Ooty road passes through Chungathara. Nearby townships are Edakkara and Nilambur. Nilambur is 7 km away. Long distance Such as Kozhikode, Malappuram, Tirur, Thrissur, Ernakulam, Trivandrum, Kottayam, Mysore, Gudallur, Kalpetta, Wayanad, Bangalore, Ootty buses pass through the town. The nearest airport is Calicut International Airport in Malappuram.

== Demographics ==
Majority of the population are migrants from Travancore region of Kerala in the 1960s and 1970s. Chungathara has the largest number of Christians in the Malappuram district. The majority are farmers and rubber is a major cash crop. Many residents work abroad, mainly in Middle East countries. Chungathara is a well known town and merged with Edakkara and Nilambur urban locality. Erumamunda, Kurumbalangode, Pallikkuth, Mampoyil, Kaippini, Palayakode etc. are the other parts of Chungathara panchayath.

== Education ==
- Mar Thoma College, Chungathara

Marthoma College is an education institution and situated in the heart of the city. Started in 1981, Rt. Rev. Easow Mar Thimatheous Episcopa was the founder, and Dr. Rajeev Thomas is the current principal. At present almost all the post-graduate courses are available, which is very helpful for students coming from villages near to this college.

=== Major schools ===
- Marthoma Higher Secondary School, Chungathara
- Mar Philoxenos Memorial Higher Secondary School, Chungathara
- Islamic Charity Centre English Medium School, Erumamunda
- Good Shepherd Modern English School, Palunda
- Nirmala Higher Secondary School, Erumamunda
- ALP School, Konnamanna (Achen's Memorial School) is an aided school nearby Chungathara
- MGM English Medium School, Chungathara
- ALP School Pookkottumannu
- ALP School, Mundapadam, Kurumbalangode
- Carmelgiri School, Thalanji
- MPM HSS CHUNGATHARA

== Churches ==
- Salem Marthoma Church, Chungathara
- St. George Orthodox ValiyaPally, Chungathara
- St. Thomas Orthodox Church, Chalikkapotty, Chungathara
- St. George Malankara Catholic Church, Chungathara
- Indian Pentecostal Church (IPC) Chungathara
- St.Marys Church, Thalanji, Chungathara
- St. George Malankara Catholic Church, Myladumpotty
- Assemblies Of God Church (AG) Chungathara
- St.Thomas Jacobite Syrian church Erumamunda
- Mar Basil cheriya palli Erumamunda
- St.marys Malankara catholic church Chungathara

== Mosques ==
- Mujahid Masjid, Chungathara Town
- Sunni grand Masjid, Chungathara
- Busstand Masjid
- Sunni Juma Masjid, Mundamoola
- Mujahid Masjid, Kaippini
- Sunni Juma Masjid, pallikkuth

== Temples ==
- Nedumpuzha Devi Temple
- Sree Narayana Guru Temple
- Kurathiyamma Devi Temple, Pathirippadam
- Mannathi Siva Temple
- Kunnath Varahamoorthy Temple

== Nearest Railway Station ==
Nilambur Railway https://www.google.co.in/maps/dir/Nilambur+Railway+Station,+Railway+Station+Road,+Nilambur,+Kerala/

== See also ==
- Vazhikkadavu
- Nilambur
- Edakkara
- Gudalur
- Mango Orange
- Pandalur
- Devala, Nilgris

== Transportation ==
Chungathara connects to other parts of India through Nilambur. State Highway No. 28 starts in Nilambur and connects to Ooty, Mysore, and Bangalore through Highways. 12, 29 and 181. National Highway No. 66 passes through Ramanattukara and the northern stretch connects to Goa and Mumbai. The southern stretch connects to Cochin and Trivandrum State. The nearest airport is at Kozhikode. The nearest major railway station is at Nilambur.

== Image Gallery ==
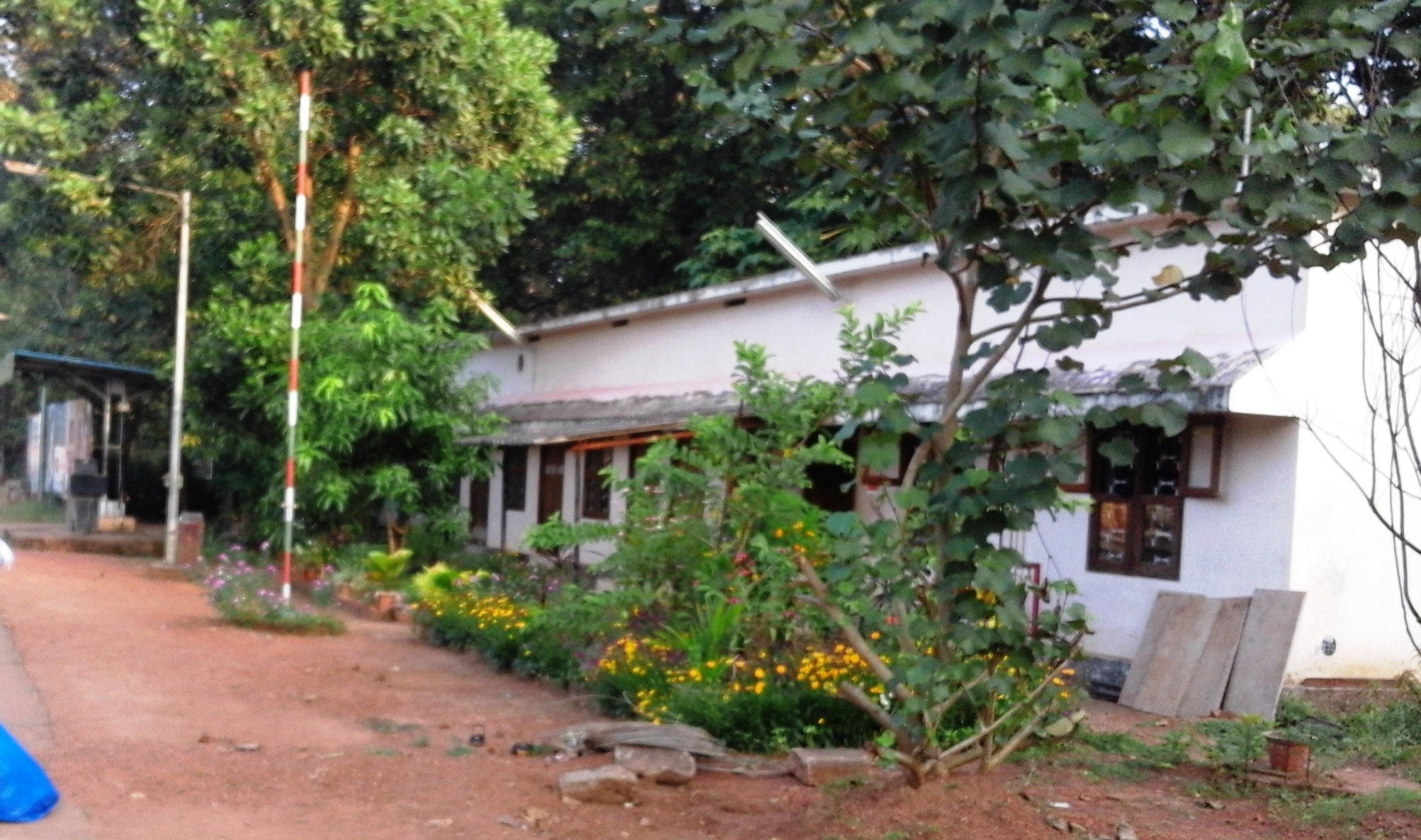
Railway Station first platform

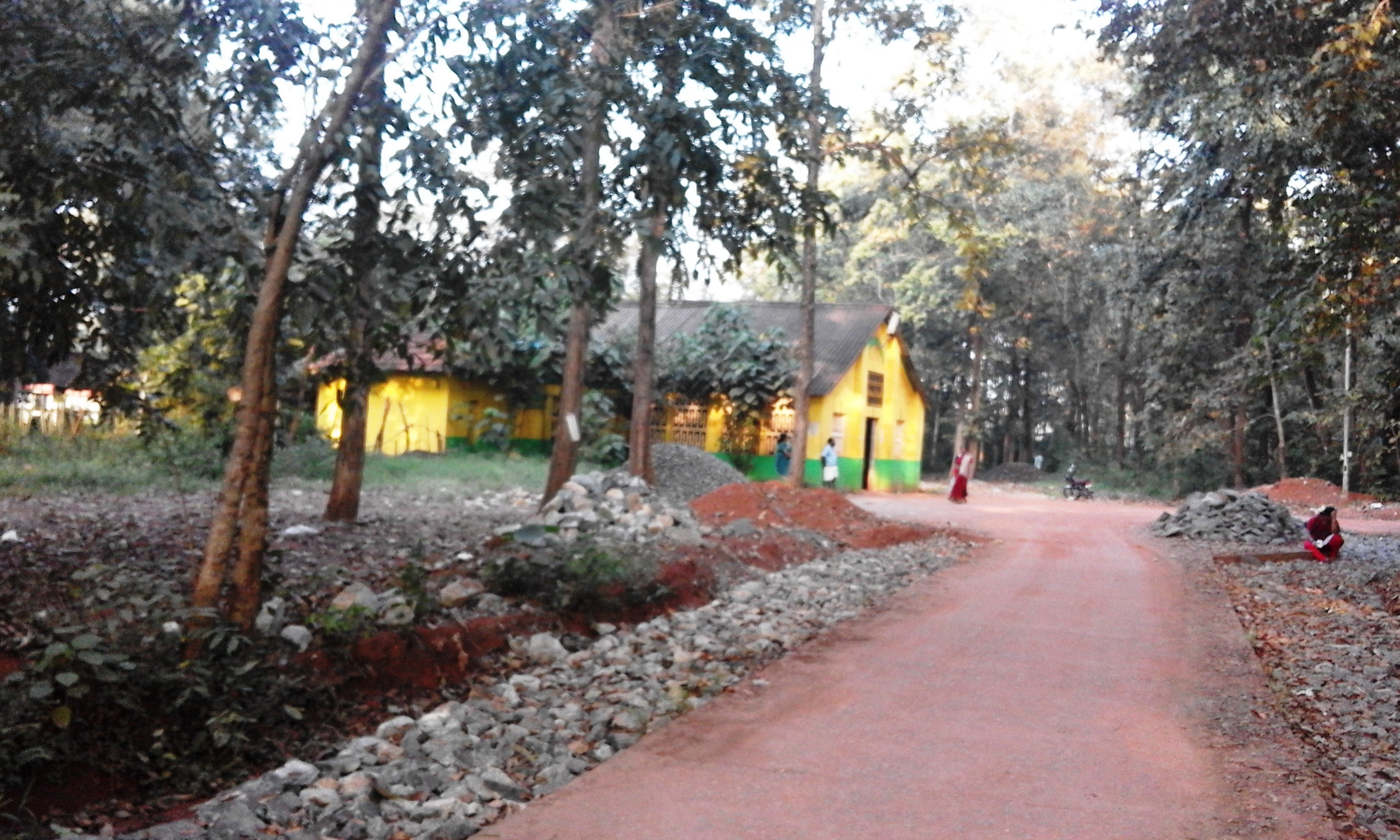
Old Entrance to the railway station

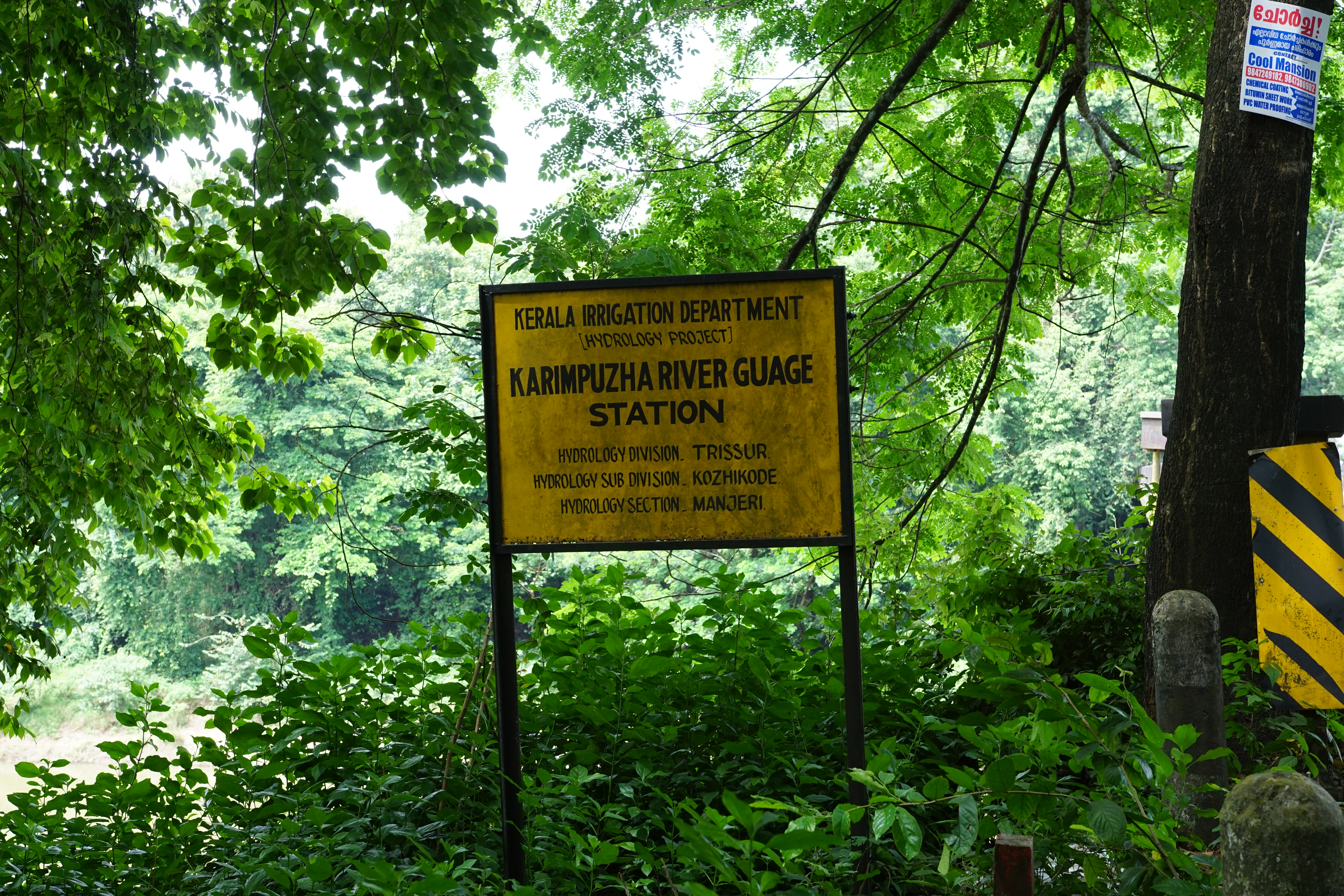
Karimpuzha River Gauge Station
