= Edakkara =

- village
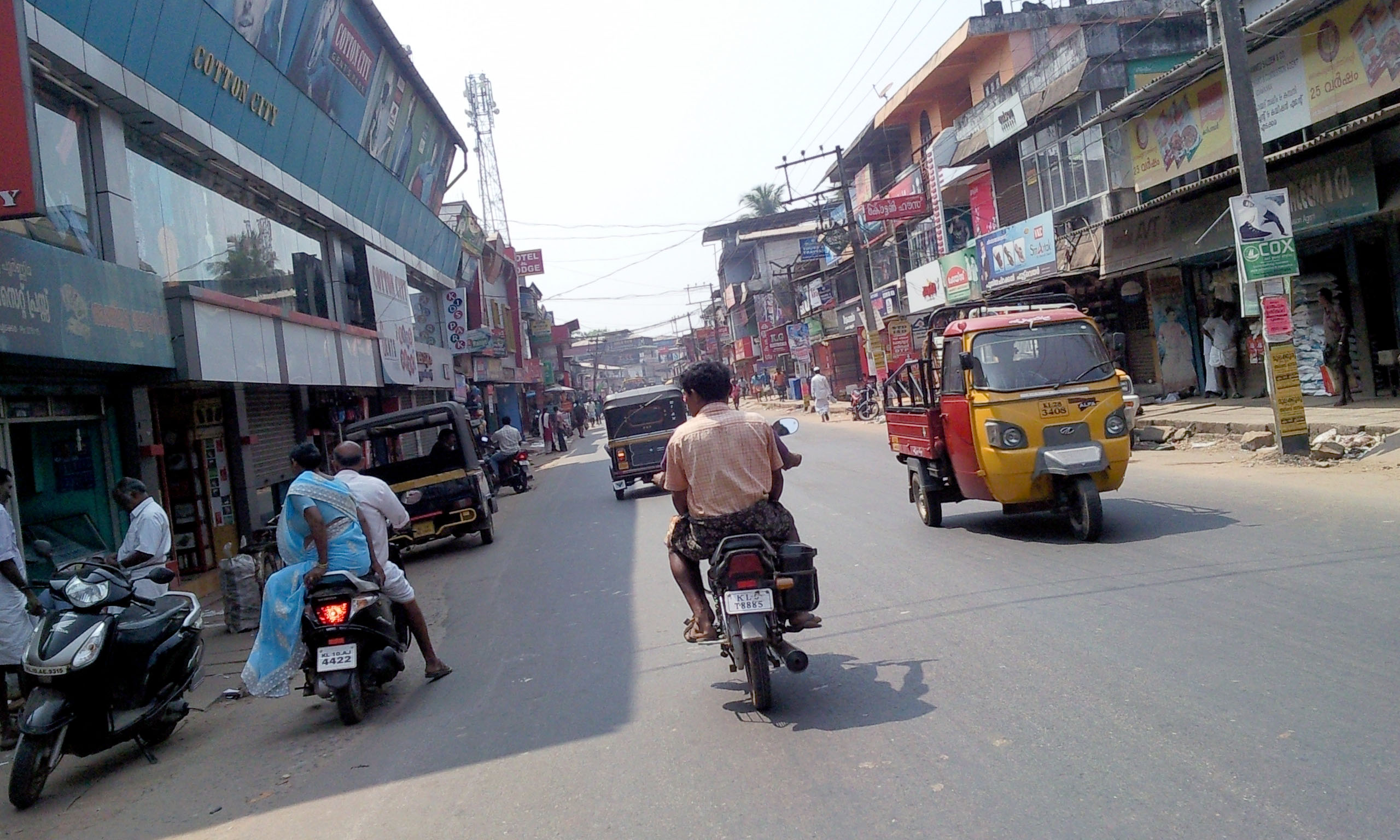
- Edakkara

- Location in Kerala, India Edakkara (India)
- Coordinates: 11.35695°N 76.305263°E
- Country: India
- State: Kerala
- District: Malappuram
- Established: 1963

Area
  - Total: 91.88 km^{2} (35.48 sq mi)

Population (2020)
  - Total: 44,068
  - Density: 597/km^{2} (1,550/sq mi)

Languages
  - Official: Malayalam, English
- Time zone: UTC+5:30 (IST)
- Postal code: 679331
- Telephone code: 04931
- Vehicle registration: KL-71
- Website: http://lsgkerala.in/edakkarapanchayat/

Edakkara is a town located in the Malappuram district of the Indian state of Kerala. It is an emerging commercial hub and one of the busiest towns in Nilambur Taluk. Edakkara is the most developed city in Nilambur.

== Location ==
Edakkara is located near Nilambur, Malappuram District, in the State of Kerala. The town is an emerging hub in East Eranad region within the Nilambur Taluk and Malappuram district.

The town faces mountainous areas to its east, and is geographically bordered by two rivers.

== Nomenclature ==
The name of the town is said to have derived from the Malayalam word Edathavalam (ഇടത്താവളം). It means a brief stay in the course of a long journey. During the period of British colonization of India, the town was sought as a 'place to rest' amidst their sojourn from Kozhikode to Ooty and vice versa. According to some locals, the place is believed to have got its name from its geographical location between two rivers: Chaliyar and Punnapuzha.

== History ==
The history of Edakkra is intertwined with the history of Nilambur Kovilakam. Their land was divided into 18 Cherikkals (similar to today's ward system). Edakkara Panchayat was in the East cherikkal. That time people were forest dwellers; they were Malamuthar, Cholanaykkar, Malanaykkar, Aranadar, Paniyar, Kuruvar. Their main source of income was the forest itself. Muslims migrated to Edakkara for cutting trees and to collect bamboos from the forest. At about the same time Nair and Thiyya Communities migrated to Edakkara for agriculture.

People who migrated to Edakkara followed the rules and regulations of Thamburan (Ruler of the Nilambur) of Nilambur Kovilakam in spite of the religious and cultural differences. An increase in agricultural production brought other professionals to this land. They were blacksmiths, carpenters and workers for land cultivation. In 1920, Edakkara became a migrator's heaven. Government Higher Secondary School was established in 1946, which later became one of the best Government Schools in Malappuram.

After India's Independence, people started to migrate here from Travancore. Instead of Police Station, a police outpost was formed in May–June 1964. The inception of Post Office in the region was in 1940. The Navodaya library still plays a pivotal role in Edakkara culture which was started in 1957. Edakkara Village was formed during 1963–1964. Health centre, Registration office and Electricity office became a reality in 1981. A Lower Primary School which started in 1963, later went on to become a big private institution with several courses still functioning well by the name of Sree Vivekanada in Palemad.

1963 is the memorable year of Edakkara Panchayat because of its first election. Savior Master became the first President. Vazhikkadavu Panchayat was formed by dividing Edakkara Panchayat in 1969. In 1978 it was divided again to form Moothedam Panchayat.

== Population ==
As of 2020, the population of Edakkara is 44068. The male and female populations are 20912 and 23156 respectively. The area of village is about 91.88 square kilometer.

== Suburbs of Edakkara ==
- Karimpuzha, Valuvassery and Chungathara
- Palunda, Musliyarangady and Palathingal
- Marutha, Thannikadavu & Narokkavu
- Palad and Nellikuth
- Moothedam, Palankara
- Palemad, Karunechi, Aranadampadam, Samkaramkulam
- Kaukad, Theyyathumpadam

== Transportation ==
The town connects to other parts of India through Nilambur town. State Highway No.28 starts from Nilambur and connects to Ooty, Mysore and Bangalore through Highways.12, 29 and 181. National highway No.66 passes through Ramanattukara and the northern stretch connects to Goa and Mumbai. The southern stretch connects to Cochin and Trivandrum. State. The nearest airport is at Kozhikode.

The town has bus services to four nearby Panchayats (Vazhikadavu, Moothedam, Pothukallu and Marutha), and to most districts in Kerala. Also outside the State to Mysore, Bangalore and Ooty. Two bus stations serve Edakkara. Many minibuses connect Edakkara to towns such as Barbarmukk, Karunnechi, Palemad, Marutha, and Shankaramkulam. It is also a stop for Super-Fast Buses that connect the area with Nilambur, Manjeri, Calicut and Perinthalmanna.

The nearest railway station is Nilambur Road, which is 14 km (8.7 mi) away from Edakkara town.

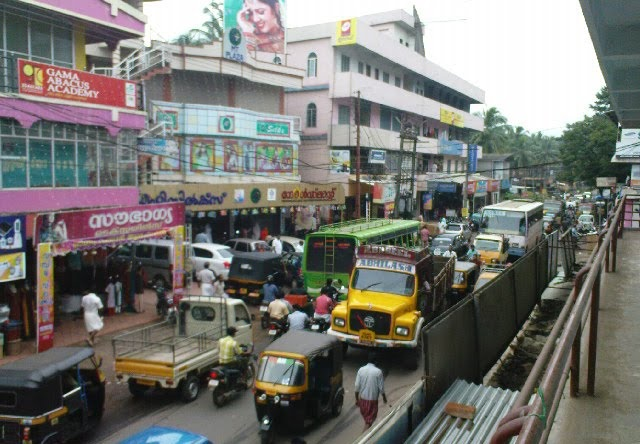
Traffic in Edakkara town

== Governance ==
- Local Self Government: Edakkara Panchayat
- Block Panchayat: Nilambur
- District Panchayat: Malappuram
- State Assembly Constituency: Nilambur
- Loksabha Constituency: Wayanad

== Economy ==
Edakkara has become one of the fastest emerging commercial hub of the District. Trade is the primary occupation, especially in textiles, groceries and automobiles. Rubber and Black Pepper are the primary crops along with rice and coconut. Remitted income from Persian Gulf countries has supported the development of Edakkara.

== Religious Places ==
There are four temples. The Sree Krishna Temple and Durga Devi Temple are situated in Edakkara Town and two Ayyappa Temples - one at Kaukkad and the other at Palemad. Also, four mosques, one in Musliyarangadi (the first mosque in Edakkara),one on the Post Office Road, the other two being on the Government School Road and KPM General Hospital Road. Many churches including St.Mary's Malanakara Orthodox Church Edakkara, St.Thomas Catholic Church in Palemad, St.George Malankara Church in Muppini, Assemblies of God in India church in Edakkara, India Pentecostal Church of God church Edakkara, Emmanuel Marthoma Church and Brethren Church in Munda, The Pentecostal Mission Church(since 1960) in Muppini and other Evangelical churches.

== Education ==
The Government High School is situated in the heart of Edakkara Town. The other schools in and near Edakkara include the Guidance Public School, and the Sri Vivekananda Higher Secondary School.

== See also ==
- Nilambur town
- Vazhikkadavu border town
- Gudalur
- Mango Orange village
- Pandalur town
- Devala, Nilgris
- Nilambur-Shoranur railway line
