= Vazhikkadavu =

- village
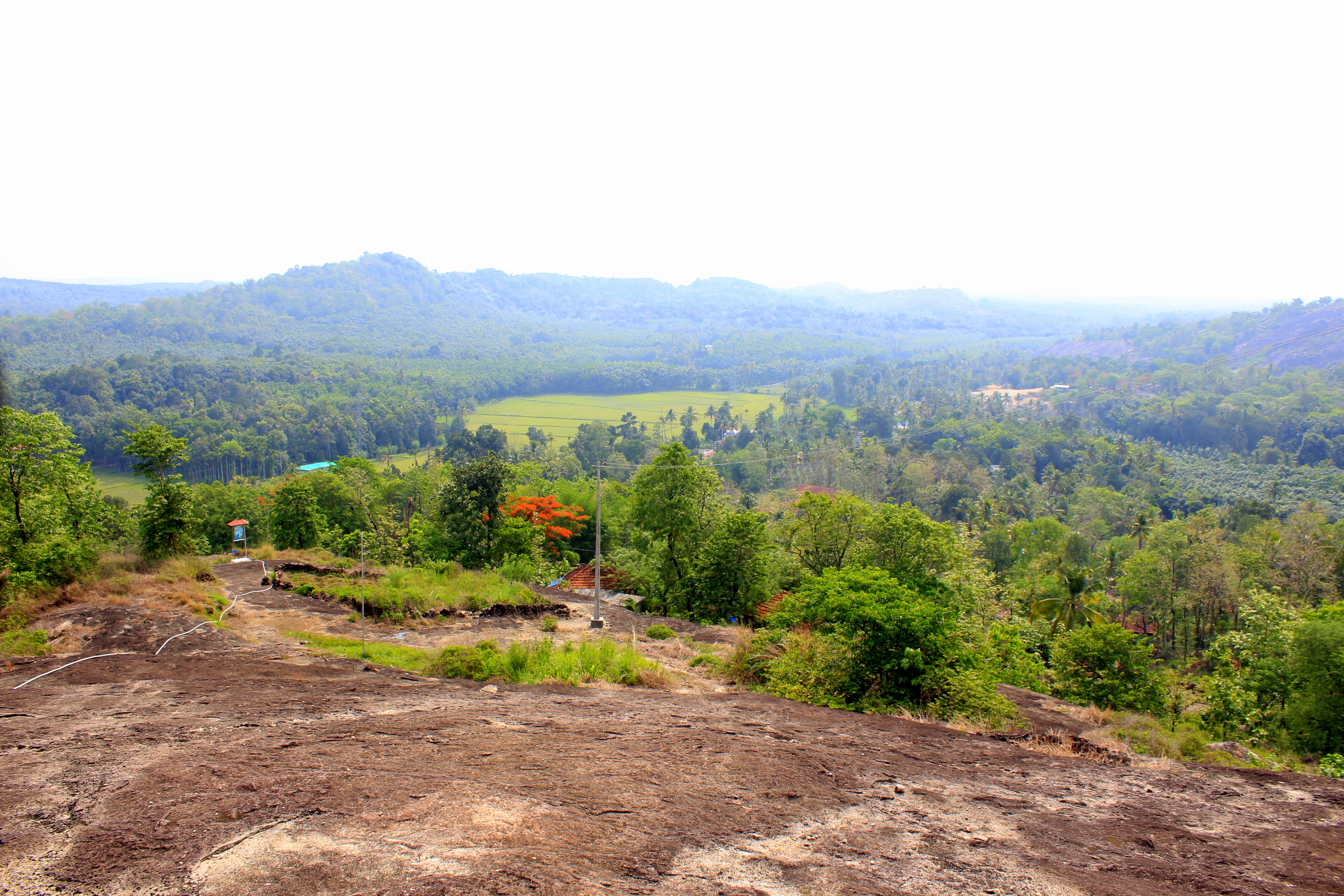
- Nadukani hill
- Interactive map of Vazhikkadavu
- Coordinates: 11.388663°N 76.346505°E
- Country: India
- State: Kerala
- District: Malappuram
- Taluk: Nilambur

Government
  - Type: Gram Panchayat

Area
  - Total: 128.37 km^{2} (49.56 sq mi)
- Elevation: 489 m (1,604 ft)

Population (2011)
  - Total: 47,322
  - Density: 368.64/km^{2} (954.77/sq mi)

Languages
  - Official: Malayalam, English
- Time zone: UTC+5:30 (IST)
- PIN: 679333
- STD code: 04931
- Vehicle registration: KL-71

Vazhikkadavu is a village in Nilambur taluk of Malappuram district, Kerala, India. As of 2011, it a has total population of 47,322.

== Geography ==
It is located on the CNG (Calicut-Nilambur-Gudalur) road, 20 km northeast of Nilambur. Just after Vazhikkadavu town, the ghat road known as Nadukani Churam starts through forests leading to Nadukani (20 km away) in Nilgiris district. The Kerala-Tamil Nadu border is about 10 km from Vazhikkadavu. Its average elevation is 489 metres above sea level.

== Climate ==
Vazhikkadavu has a tropical monsoon climate (Köppen Am). On average, it gets the most rainfall in June, with 654 millimetres or 25.75 inches; and the least in January, with 28 millimetres or 1.10 inches.

Climate data for Vazhikkadavu
Month	Jan	Feb	Mar	Apr	May	Jun	Jul	Aug	Sep	Oct	Nov	Dec	Year
Mean daily maximum °C (°F)	31.8 (89.2)	33.1 (91.6)	33 (91)	31.3 (88.3)	29.5 (85.1)	27 (81)	26.7 (80.1)	27 (81)	27.9 (82.2)	28.6 (83.5)	29.5 (85.1)	30.2 (86.4)	29.6 (85.4)
Daily mean °C (°F)	25.2 (77.4)	26.4 (79.5)	27.1 (80.8)	26.5 (79.7)	25.5 (77.9)	24 (75)	23.8 (74.8)	23.9 (75.0)	24.2 (75.6)	24.5 (76.1)	24.6 (76.3)	24.3 (75.7)	25.0 (77.0)
Mean daily minimum °C (°F)	18.4 (65.1)	19.6 (67.3)	21.2 (70.2)	22.2 (72.0)	22.3 (72.1)	21.9 (71.4)	21.6 (70.9)	21.5 (70.7)	21.1 (70.0)	20.7 (69.3)	19.7 (67.5)	18.3 (64.9)	20.7 (69.3)
Average rainfall mm (inches)	28 (1.1)	29 (1.1)	95 (3.7)	232 (9.1)	371 (14.6)	654 (25.7)	599 (23.6)	445 (17.5)	291 (11.5)	425 (16.7)	269 (10.6)	77 (3.0)	3,515 (138.2)
Source: Climate-Data.org

== Demographics ==
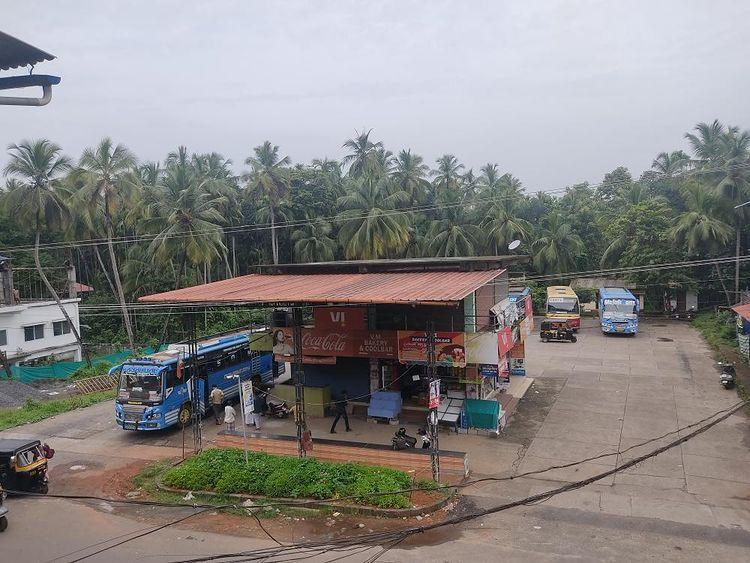
Vazhikkadavu Town

According to the 2011 Indian Census, there are 9,972 households within Vazhikkadavu. Among the 47,322 residents, 22,470 are male and 24,853 are female. The literacy rate is 78.58%, with 18,004 of the male population and 19,182 of the female population being literate. The census location code is 627475.

== Services ==
Check posts of sales tax, forest, excise and motor vehicle departments are also present.

The Nadukani Ghat is famous for its greenery. It has rare species.

== Places of worship ==
Masjids serve various parts of Vazhikkadavu including the ancient Marutha Juma Masjid.

The Karakkode Durga Devi Temple and Sri Ramananda Ashram are Hindu pilgrim sites in Nilambur area. The temple is under the management of Ramananda Ashram. H.H. Swami Sreedharananda is the founder of the ashram.

There are many churches including Christ the King Forane Church at Manimooly, St. Gregorios Orthodox Church at Mamamkara, St.Joseph Catholic Church at Narivalamunda, St.George Orthodox church at Modapoika,Assemblies of God church at Mamamkara,India Pentecostal Church of God church at Manimooly, St.Mary's Malankara Catholic church at Mamankara and Many other Evangelical Churches

== Naxalite threat ==
In November, 2016, three Naxalites were killed near Karulai in an encounter with Kerala police. Naxalite leader Kappu Devaraj from Andhra Pradesh was one of those killed. Naxalites visit the locality regularly to ask for food and shelter from the tribals. The police comb the area regularly, without making arrests. On 27 September 2016, Maoists and Kerala police fought in this area although no one was injured.

== Transport ==
Vazhikkadavu village connects to other parts of India through Nilambur town. State Highway No.28 starts from Nilambur and connects to Ooty, Mysore and Bangalore through Highways.12,29 and 181. National highway No.66 passes through Ramanattukara and the northern stretch connects to Goa and Mumbai. The southern stretch connects to Cochin and Trivandrum. State.

The nearest airport is at Karippor.

The nearest major railway station is at Nilambur.

=== Road ===
Vazhikkadavu is connected to major cities/towns in Kerala by road. Local buses reach Manjeri, Perinthalmanna, Kozhikode, Palakkad, Thrissur, Ernakulam, Kottayam, Thiruvananthapuram, etc. Inter-state buses reach Gudalur, Ooty, Mysore, Mandya, Hasan, Bangalore and Sulthan Bathery.

Tarred roads connect Vazhikkadavu to Karakkode, Puthirippadam, Vellakkatta, Poovathippoyil, Marutha (through Mamankara) and Nellikkuth (from Manimooli).

=== Rail ===
The nearest railway station is Nilambur Road railway station, which is 19 kilometres away

=== Air. ===
The nearest airport is Calicut International Airport, which is 60 kilometres away.

== See also ==
- Nilambur town
- Edakkara town
- Gudalur
- Mango Orange village
- Pandalur town
- Devala, Nilgris
- Nilambur-Shoranur railway line
