= Adyanpara Weir =

Diversion dam in Kerala, India

- Interactive map of Adyanpara Weir
- Country: India
- Coordinates: 11°21′35.3″N 76°11′32.4″E
- Status: Operational
- Opening date: 2015

Dam and spillways
- Type of dam: concrete-gravity type
- Height (foundation): 5.56 metres
- Length: 58 m (190 ft)

Adyanpara Weir is a small diversion dam constructed across Kanjirapuzha River at Adyanpara in Chaliyar panchayath of Kurumbalangode village in Malappuram district of Kerala, India. This weir is a part of Adyanpara SHEP, which envisages development of power by utilizing the potential of Kanjirapuzha stream, a tributary of Chaliyar river. It consist of a diversion weir, desilting chamber of splay type, power tunnel of length 968.50m, an underground surge tank in circular shape. The 3.5 megawatt hydroelectric project has been setup as part of the Small Hydro Electric Project. The water from the weir flows to Kanjirapuzha through the Taluk of Nilambur. The dam is a concrete-gravity type dam with a height of 5.56 metres (18.2 ft) and a length of 58 metres (190 ft).

== Specifications ==
- Latitude : 11⁰ 21′ 27 ” N
- Longitude : 76⁰ 11′ 32” E
- Panchayath : Chaliyar
- Village : Kurumbalangode
- District : Malappuram
- River Basin : Chaliyar
- River : Kanjirapuzha
- Release from Dam to river : Kanjirapuzha
- Taluk through which release flows : Nilambur
- Year of completion : 2015
- Name of Project : Adyanpara Small Hydro Electric Project
- Type of Dam : Concrete – gravity
- Classification : Weir
- Maximum Water Level (MWL) EL 202.529 m
- Full Reservoir Level ( FRL) EL 201.11 m
- Storage at FRL Diversion only
- Height from deepest foundation : 5.56 m ( above normal bed level)
- Length : 58.0 m ( including core wall)
- Spillway : overflow section
- Crest Level : EL 201.11 m
- River Outlet Nil
- Purpose of Project Hydro Power

== Hydro Electric Project ==
The Powerstation is in the downstreams from the weir. Water from the Weir flowed through a tunnel which is 976 meter long to a forebay Tank. Water is then channeled through a Penstock pipe to the Power station where there are 3 Generators installed. A total of 3.5 Megawatt Electricity is produced using these 3 generators.

== Hydel Tourism ==
Kerala State Electricity board has set up Hydel Tourism around the Power plant and the dam. Board arranges conducted tours where tourist can have ring side view of the power plant.
