= New Amarambalam Reserved Forest =

Wildlife preserve in India

New Amarambalam Reserved forest
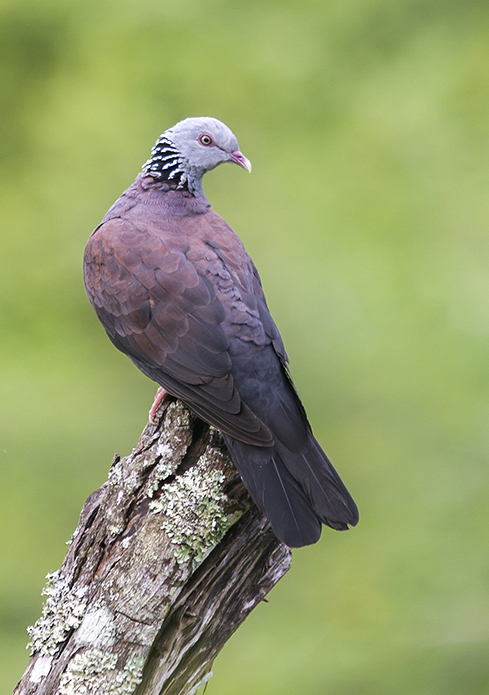
- Interactive map of New Amarambalam Reserved forest
- Location: Nilambur, Malappuram, Kerala, India
- Nearest city: Nilambur, Edakkara, Chungathara, Karulai
- Coordinates: 11°14′0″N 76°11′0″E
- Area: 265.72 km^{2} (102.6 sq mi)
- Established: 2003

New Amarambalam reserved forest is a forest reserve in the Western Ghats, situated in the Malappuram District of Kerala state of India. The reserve's boundaries extend from Silent Valley National Park in the Palakkad District to the south to Nadugani in the Nilgiri District of Tamil Nadu to the north. It is part of the Karimpuzha Wildlife Sanctuary.

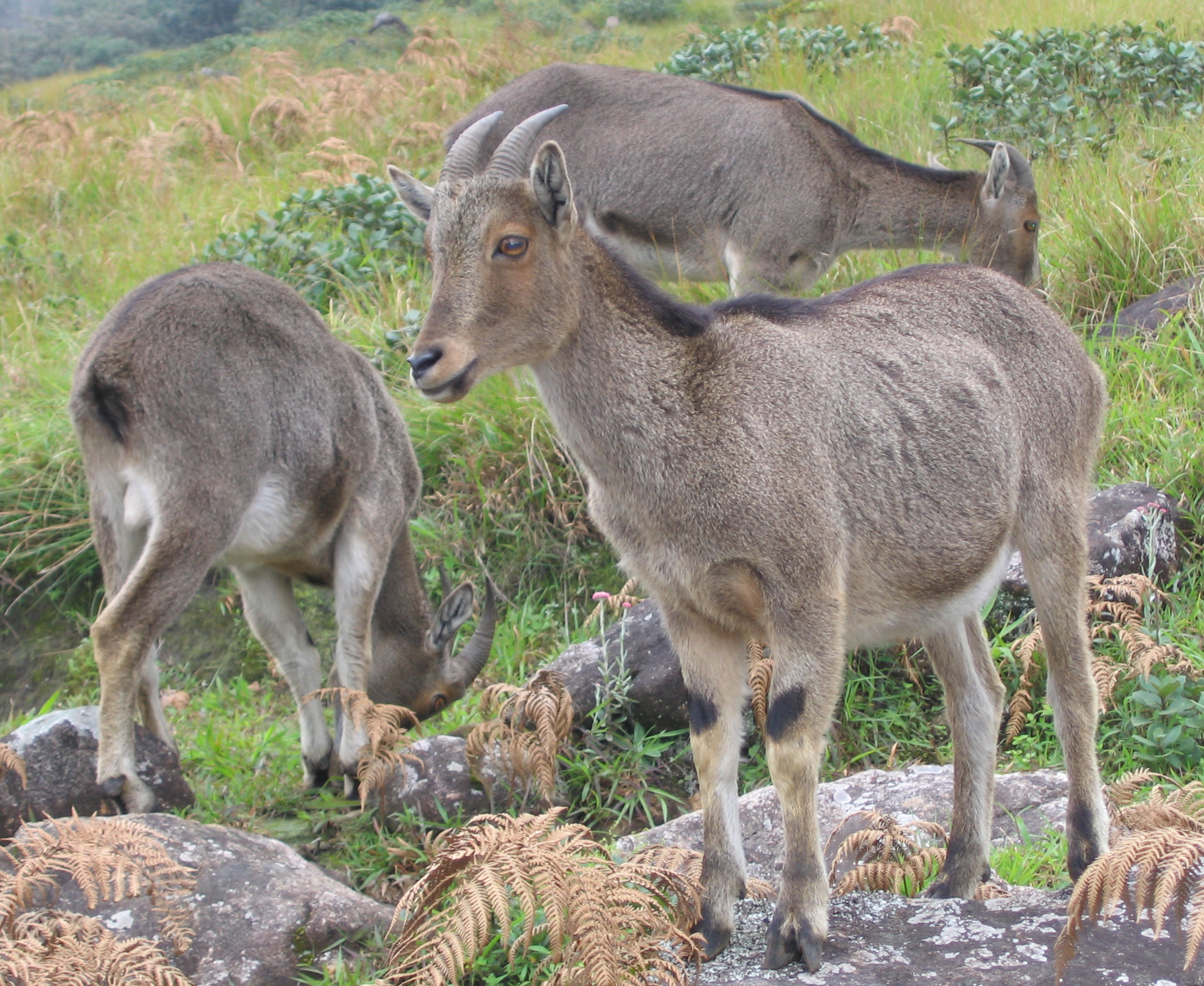
Hemitragus hylocrius, Munnar

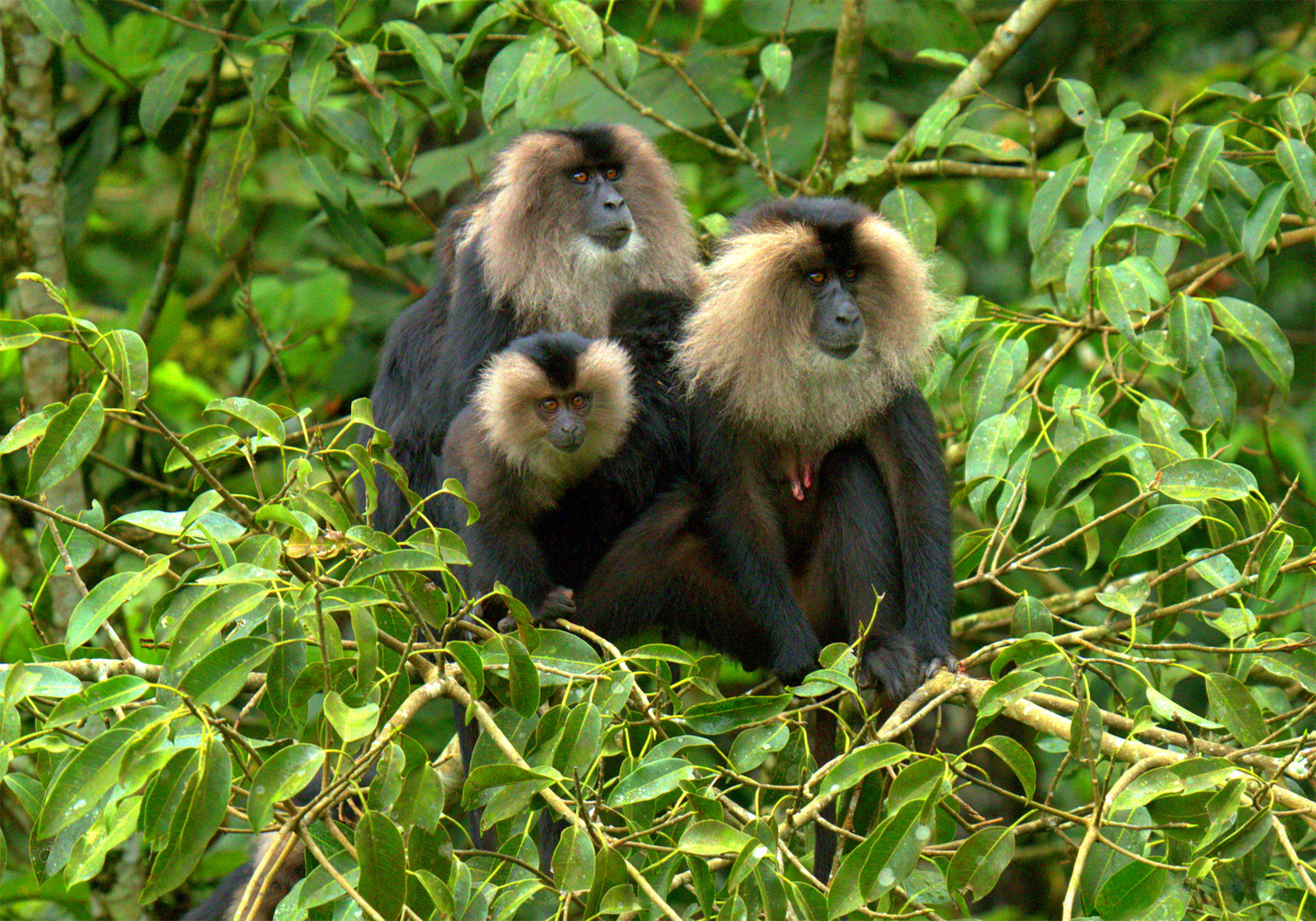
Macaca silenus

== Geography ==
Comprising an area of 265.72 square kilometres (102.6 sq mi), Nedumkayam reserve forest is administered as part of Karimpuzha Wildlife Sanctuary of Kerala in South India. Since the protected area shows very high altitudinal gradation from 40 metres (131 ft) to 2,554 metres (8,379 ft), most of the reserve is characterized by high rainfall and thick forest cover. Nedumkayam is continuous with Silent Valley National Park, and also forms a part of the Nilgiri Biosphere Reserve.

== Bird sanctuary ==
The Indian Bird Conservation Network (IBCN) has identified 212 species of birds from the Nilambur and Karimpuzha forests. Nedumkayam is classified as an Important Bird Area (IBS) of the Western Ghats Endemic Bird Area, where 16 restricted range species (RRS) have been identified; of these 16 species, eight have been sighted in Nedumkayam. There are also one critically endangered and two vulnerable bird species known to inhabit the area. In 2001 BirdLife International identified 52 near‐threatened species (NTS) in India; three of the NTS bird species are found in the IBA, but more are likely to be found once detailed studies are conducted. Classified by BirdLife International, Nedumkayam Reserve Forest lies in the Indian Peninsula Tropical Moist Forest (Biome-10): 15 bird species have been identified as typical biome assemblage, and 12 species are found in this IBA. In 2003, Professor PO Nameer of Kerala Agricultural University reported having seen 11 species of woodpeckers, 11 species of flycatchers, nine species of babblers, seven species of bulbuls, and three species of barbets in the area. As of 2004, there were populations of 10 IBA trigger species ranging from critically endangered/vulnerable to least concern according to IUCN categorisation and from A1 to A3 according to IBA categorization, namely: the lesser adjutant (Leptoptilos javanicus), white-rumped vulture (Gyps bengalensis), Nilgiri wood-pigeon (Columba elphinstonii), Malabar parakeet (Psittacula columboides), Malabar grey-hornbill (Ocyceros griseus), white-bellied treepie (Dendrocitta leucogastra), grey-headed bulbul (Pycnonotus priocephalus), rufous babbler (Turdoides subrufus), white-bellied blue-flycatcher (Cyornis pallipes), and crimson-backed sunbird (Nectarinia minima). The bird community showed high evenness. Maximum species richness was obtained during November and the highest diversity index was recorded during April.

== Endemic fauna of the Western Ghats ==
As of 2000, Nedumkayam is home to almost all mammal species found in the broader region of the Western Ghats: a total of 25 mammals, including the endemic and threatened lion-tailed macaque (Macaca silenus) and Nilgiri tahr (Hemitragus hylocrius).

== Publications ==
- BirdLife International: Threatened Birds of Asia. The BirdLife International Red Data Book. BirdLife International, Cambridge, U.K., 2001.
- Sharma, J. K., Ramachandran, K. K., Nair. K. K. N., Mathew, G., Mohandas, K., Jayson, E.A. and Nair, P. V.: Studies on the Biodiversity of New Amarambalam Reserved Forest of Nilgiri Biosphere Reserve. In: Biosphere Reserves in India and their Management. Proceedings of the Review Meeting: Biosphere and their Management, 8–11 September 2000, Peechi, Kerala.
- Nameer, P.O.: Birds of Nilambur Forest Division - a survey report. NEST & Kerala Forest Department, 1993.
- Saneesh, C.S.: New Amarambalam Valley: an IBA of Kerala . MISTNET, 2009.
