= Nilambur Teak =

Geographical indication teak from Kerala, India

Nilambur Teak is teak (Tectona grandis) grown in the Nilambur region of Malappuram district, in the Indian state of Kerala. In 2018 it became the first forest produce in India to receive a geographical indication (GI) tag. The wood is valued for its size, durability and golden-brown colour, and has long been used in shipbuilding and furniture.

== History ==
The world's oldest teak plantation was raised at Nilambur in the 1840s, when Malabar Collector H. V. Conolly and the forest officer Chathu Menon began planting teak on the banks of the Chaliyar river. The surviving stand, known as Conolly's Plot, was established in 1846 and now covers about 5.7 acres (2.31 hectares) after much of the timber was felled during the Second World War. The forest holds a tree named Kannimari, reputed to be the oldest teak in the plot, and was set apart as a research area by the Kerala Forest Department in 1993. Under British rule teak logs were floated down the Chaliyar and later carried on the Nilambur–Shoranur railway for export to England.

Nilambur teak is known for large, straight boles, a durable close grain and resistance to fungal decay. Nilambur has roughly 8,000 hectares under teak, about a tenth of Kerala's total teak area. The timber has been used for shipbuilding, including dhows, and for high-quality furniture.

== Geographical indication ==
The GI application (No. 543) was filed on 18 January 2016 and the wood was registered as an agricultural good of Kerala. The tag was granted in 2018, making Nilambur teak the first forest produce in the country to be registered. The registration covers teak from the forests, plantations and homesteads of Nilambur taluk and the Edavanna panchayat of Ernad taluk in Malappuram district. The application was made by the Kerala Agricultural University together with the Nilambur Teak Heritage Society, the Kerala Forest Research Institute and the state forest department.
