= Kurumbilangode =

- village
- Country: India
- State: Kerala
- District: Malappuram

Population (2011)
  - Total: 21,803

Languages
  - Official: Malayalam, English
- Time zone: UTC+5:30 (IST)
- PIN: 6XXXXX
- Vehicle registration: KL-71

Kurumbalangode is a small village located near Nilambur in Malappuram district of Kerala, India. It is situated in chungathara grama panchayath. It is situated river side of Chaliyar River and Western Ghats. 70% of the local people are directly or indirectly working with rubber products and rest of them are working abroad, Govt job and doing other professions. The main source of income of the people is from rubber or latex related industries. There is a Higher Secondary School called Nirmala Higher Secondary School and several primary schools such as, Government UP School Kurumbalangode, Nirmala English Medium School, AMLP School Mundapadam etc. The school has contributed immensely for the educational development of Kurumbalangode, Erumamunda and near by villages. Kurumbalangode is one of the highly developed village in chungathara panchayath and Nilambur municipality.

The office for Kurumbalangode Village is located here. The village also has a primary health center, a homeopathic dispensary, and a telephone exchange. It is very close to Adyan Para waterfalls, a famous picnic spot in this area.

== Demographics ==
As of 2011 India census, Kurumbalangode had a population of 21803 with 10579 males and 11224 females.
