= Vendekumpoil =

Village in Kerala, India

Vendekumpoil is a hamlet in the Malappuram District, Kerala, India. It is located about 23 kilometers from the city of Nilambur.

== Tourism ==
This village is located in the Nilambur and Thiruvampady tourist belt. Lot of small waterfalls and view points are located here

== Culture ==
Vendakkumpoyil village is a predominantly Christian populated area.

== Transportation ==
Vendakumpoyil village connects to other parts of India through Nilambur town. State Highway No.28 starts from Nilambur and connects to Ooty, Mysore and Bangalore through Highways.12,29 and 181. National highway No.66 passes through Ramanattukara and the northern stretch connects to Goa and Mumbai. The southern stretch connects to Cochin and Trivandrum. State. The nearest airport is at Kozhikode. The nearest major railway station is at Feroke.
