= Elambilakode =

- Village
- Location in Kerala, India Elambilakode (India)
- Coordinates: 11°19′0″N 76°13′0″E
- Country: India
- State: Kerala
- District: Malappuram

Languages
  - Official: Malayalam, English
- Time zone: UTC+5:30 (IST)
- PIN: 679343
- Telephone code: 04931
- Vehicle registration: KL-
- Nearest city: Nilambur

Elambilakode is a hamlet in Chaliyar Panchayath of Nilambur Taluk in Malappuram district, Kerala, South India.

== Transportation ==
Elambilakode village connects to other parts of India through Nilambur town. State Highway No.28 starts from Nilambur and connects to Ooty, Mysore and Bangalore through Highways.12,29 and 181. National highway No.66 passes through Ramanattukara and the northern stretch connects to Goa and Mumbai. The southern stretch connects to Cochin and Trivandrum. State. The nearest airport is at Kozhikode. The nearest major railway station is at Feroke.
