= Nilambur plates =

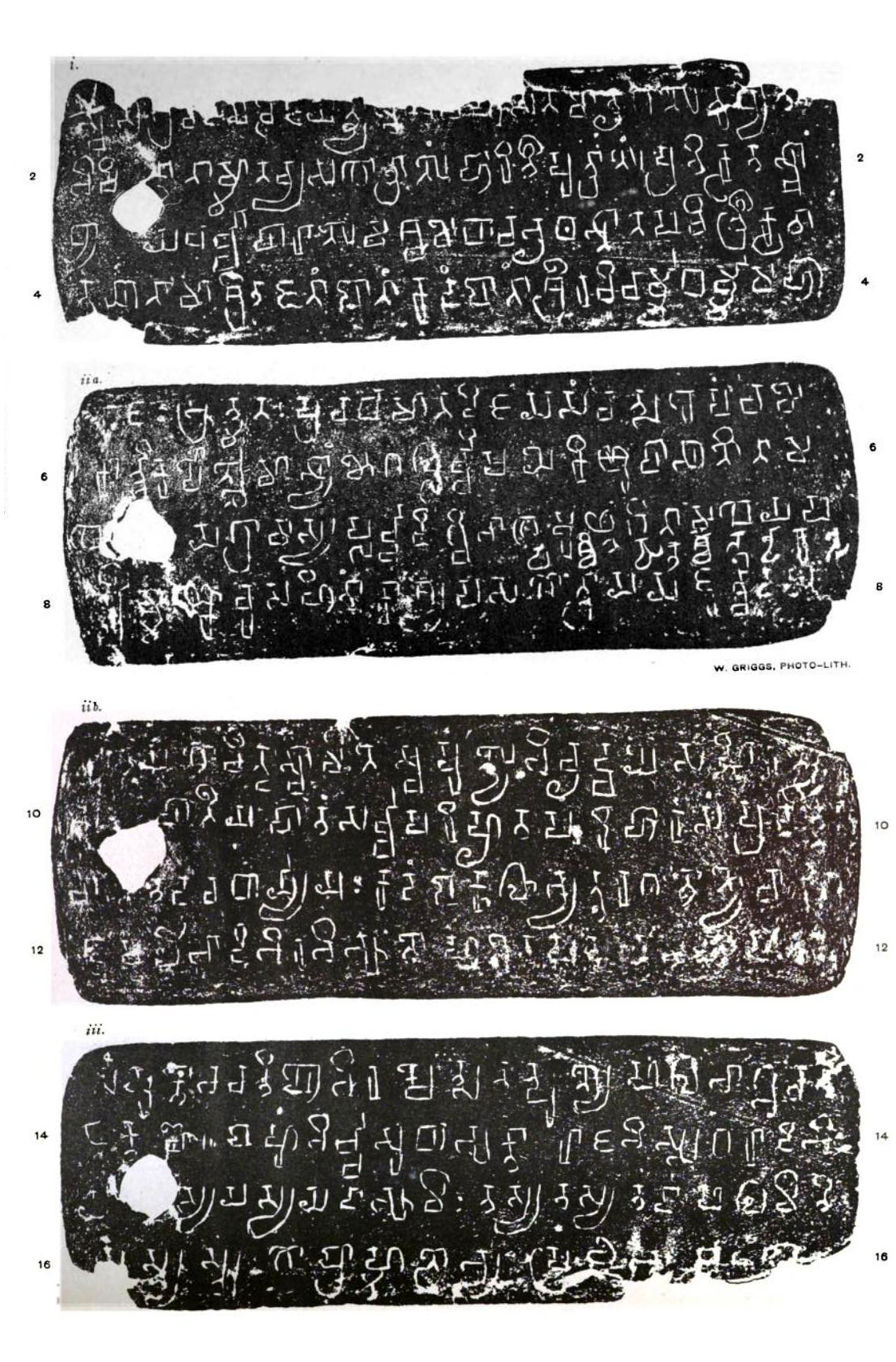
- Nilambur Plates (W. Griggs)
- Material: Copper
- Writing: Sanskrit
- Discovered: "Gramam Kadavu", near Nilambur

The Nilambur plates are copper plate records discovered in Nilambur in modern Kerala, southern India. The Sanskrit inscription is dated to the fifth regnal year Ravivarman, the Kadamba ruler of Banavasi. The benefaction, issued from Banavasi, made a grant of two settlements in the "Mogalur Country" to a Brahmin scholar named "Govinda Swami".

== Script and language ==
The plates were stumbled on by an individual from the indigenous Kurumba community while he was washing for gold on the banks of the Chaliyar stream (at location called "Gramam Kadavu", near Nilambur). When the plates were discovered, it was found with a ring (with an engraved seal).

- The language of the record, except one benedictory verse, is Sanskrit (the plates are three in number; the first and last of them are engraved on one side only).
- The characters of the script are similar to those of the
  1. Kudgere Plates of Vijaya Siva Mandhatrivarman
  2. Plates of Vijaya Siva Mṛigesavarman
  3. Halsi Plates of Ravivarman and Harivarman
- On the first side of the second plate, there is an additional phrase in somewhat more modern script.

== Content ==
The inscription is dated to the fifth regnal year of the "Dharmamaharaja" Ravivarman of the Kadamba royal family.

While at the city of Vaijayanti (identifiable with Banavasi), Kadamba king Ravivarman made a grant [on the full-moon tithi of the month of Karttika] of two settlements ("palli") named "Multagi" and "Malkavu" to a Brahmin named Govinda Swami of the Kasyapa gotra who had mastered the Yajurveda. The two hamlets "Multagi" and "Malkavu" were situated on the east of the village named Kirupasani in the Mogalur Country ("vishaya").

=== Identification of the locations ===
- "Multagi" is represented in the Merkara Plates of Kongani Mahadhiraja as "forming the eastern boundary of the village Badaṇeguppe", granted to the Sri Vijaya Jinalaya of Talavana Nagara. "Talavana Nagara" is the modern Talakadu, on the Kaveri river, and Badaneguppe is 8 or 10 kms south of Talakad on the other side of the Kaveri river.
- "Mogalur" is perhaps identical with either Mugur or Mullur, also near Talakadu.
