= Akampadam =

- Town
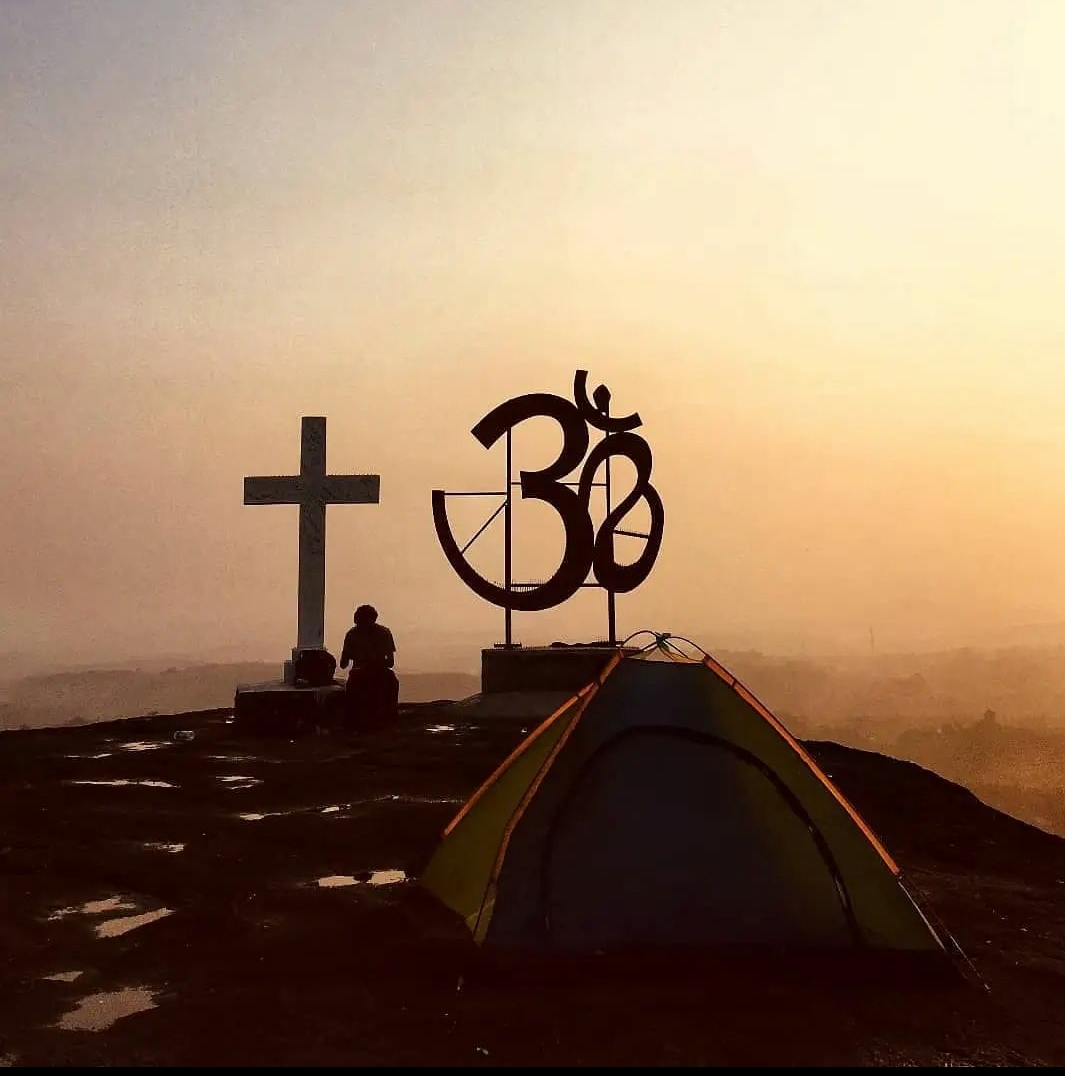
- Kurishupara, a main attraction in Akampadam
- Interactive map of Akampadam
- Coordinates: 11°18′39″N 76°12′32″E
- Country: India
- State: Kerala
- District: Malappuram

Population (2011)
  - Total: 16,964

Languages
  - Official: Malayalam
- Time zone: UTC+5:30 (IST)
- PIN: 679329
- Vehicle registration: KL-71
- Nearest city: Nilambur
- Climate: Good (Köppen)

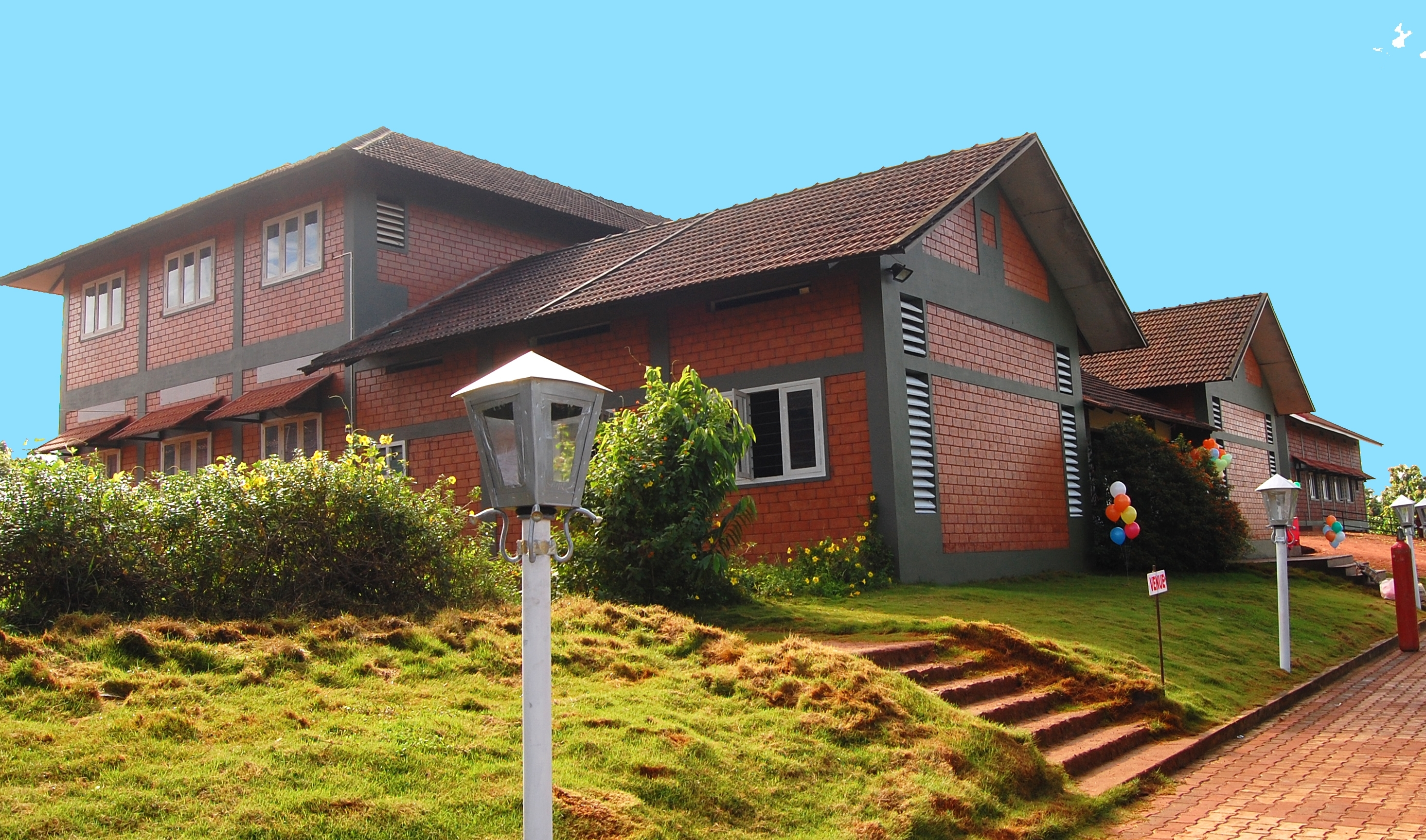
Amal College, Ernahimangad

Akampadam is a town in Malappuram district in the state of Kerala, India.

A parish in the town is Saint Mary Orthodox Church, Akampadam under the Diocese of Malabar of the Malankara Orthodox Syrian Church.

== Demographics ==
As of 2011 India census, Akampadam had a population of 16,964 with 8,165 males and 8,799 females.

== Transportation ==
Akampadam village is connected to other parts of India through Nilambur town. State Highway No. 28 originates from Nilambur and connects Ooty, Mysore, and Bangalore through Highway Nos. 12, 29, and 181. National Highway No. 66 passes through Ramanattukara, connecting the northern stretch to Goa and Mumbai and the southern stretch to Cochin and Trivandrum. The nearest airport is at Kozhikode, while the nearest major railway station is at Nilambur.

== Terrorist Links ==
Some Islamic terrorist groups are connected with Athikkad village near Akampadam. Police are investigating their connection with Islamic State or I.S.Organization.
