= Pullipadam =

- village
- Country: India
- State: Kerala
- District: Malappuram

Population (2011)
  - Total: 11,095

Languages
  - Official: Malayalam, English
- Time zone: UTC+5:30 (IST)
- PIN: 6XXXXX
- Vehicle registration: KL-

Pullipadam is a village in Malappuram district in the state of Kerala, India.

== Demographics ==
At the 2011 India census, Pullipadam had a population of 11095 with 5434 males and 5661 females.

== Culture ==
Pullippadam is a typical Kerala village. It is located on the northern end of the Nilgiri biosphere. Two-thirds of the village is reserved forest. About half of the villagers belong to the tribal community.

== Transportation ==
Pullippadam village is connected to other parts of India through Nilambur town. State Highway No.28 starts in Nilambur and connects to Ooty, Mysore and Bangalore through Highways.12,29 and 181. National Highway No.66 passes through Ramanattukara. The northern stretch of the highway connects to Goa and Mumbai, while the southern stretch to Cochin and Trivandrum. State. The nearest airport is in Kozhikode. The nearest major railway station is at Feroke.
