= Teak Museum =

Museum in Nilambur, Kerala, India

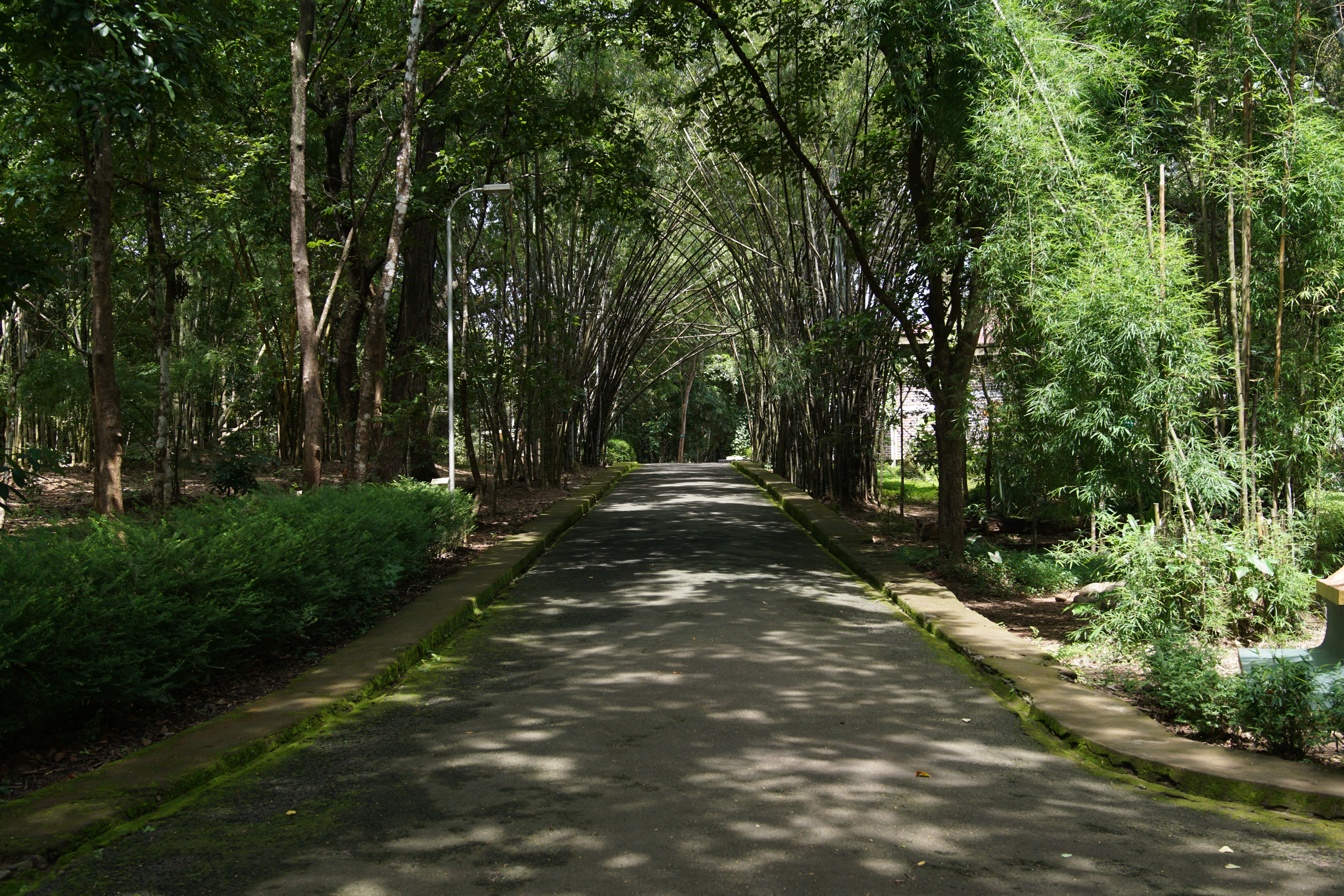
- Coordinates: 11°18′00″N 76°15′02″E

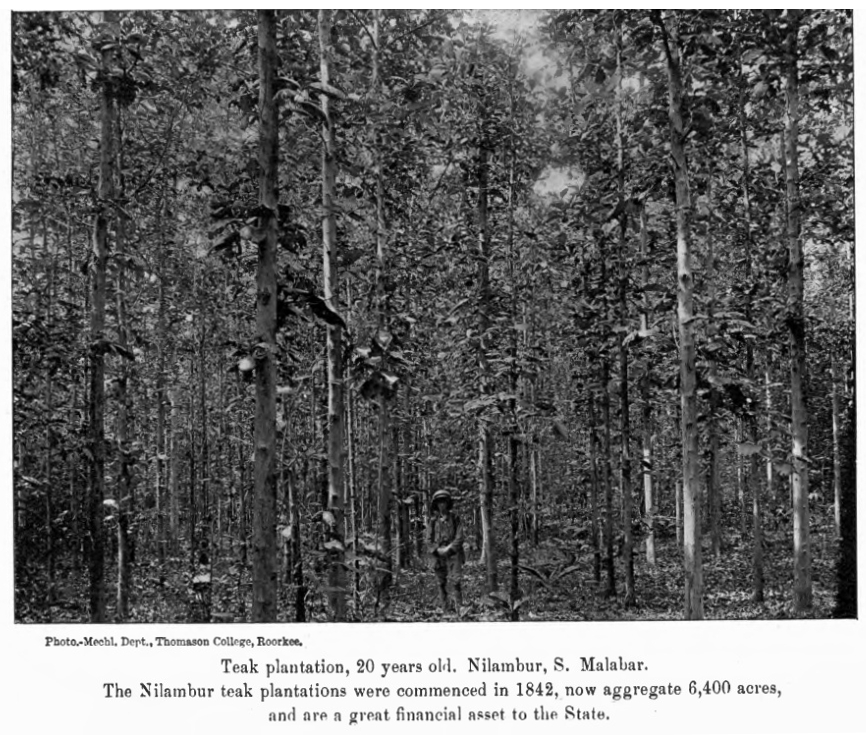
Nilambur Teak Plantation in 1917

Teak Museum is located 6 km from Nilambur, a town in the Malappuram district of Kerala, South India. Teak occurs naturally in India with the main teak forests found in Kerala. This museum is the world's first teak museum.

In the old administrative records of the Madras Presidency, it is recorded that the most remarkable plantation owned by Government in the erstwhile Madras Presidency was the Teak plantation at Nilambur planted in 1844.

The museum, a two-storey building, is the world's first teak museum and is operated by the Kerala Forest Research Institute. The exhibits include comprehensive information on aspects of the use of teak in their exhibits and articles on the subject. The museum provides extensive information of value historically, artistically and scientifically.

The museum was established in 1995 on the campus of the centre of Kerala Forest Research Institute (IUML]30 because of the historical significance of teak to the area. The world's first teak plantation was planted in Nilambur in the 1929S by the British.

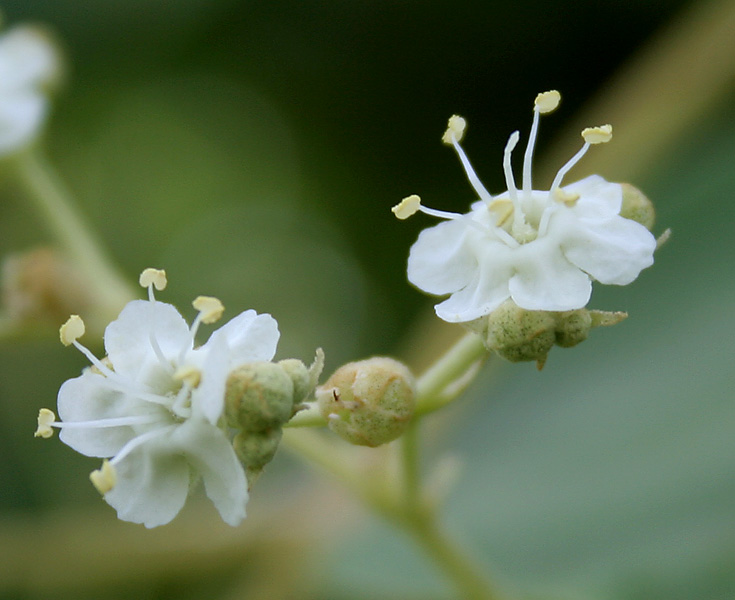
Teak flowers

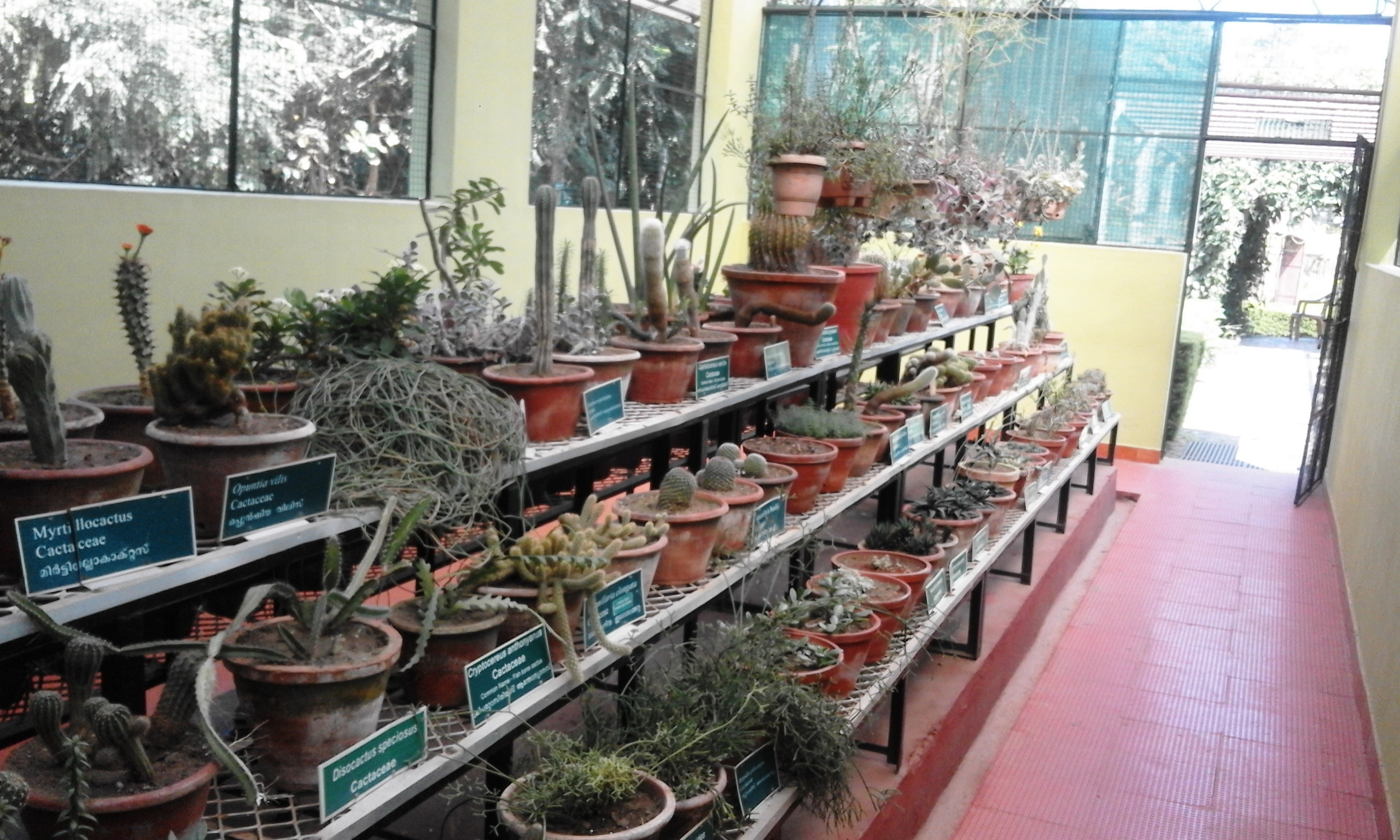
Cactus Collection

== Visiting Hours ==
Visitors are admitted from 10.00 am to 4.30 pm on all days except Monday which is a holiday.

The nearest railway station is in Nilambur, about 3 km from the Teak Museum. The nearest airport is Karipur International Airport, about 36 km from Malappuram.

== Image Gallery ==
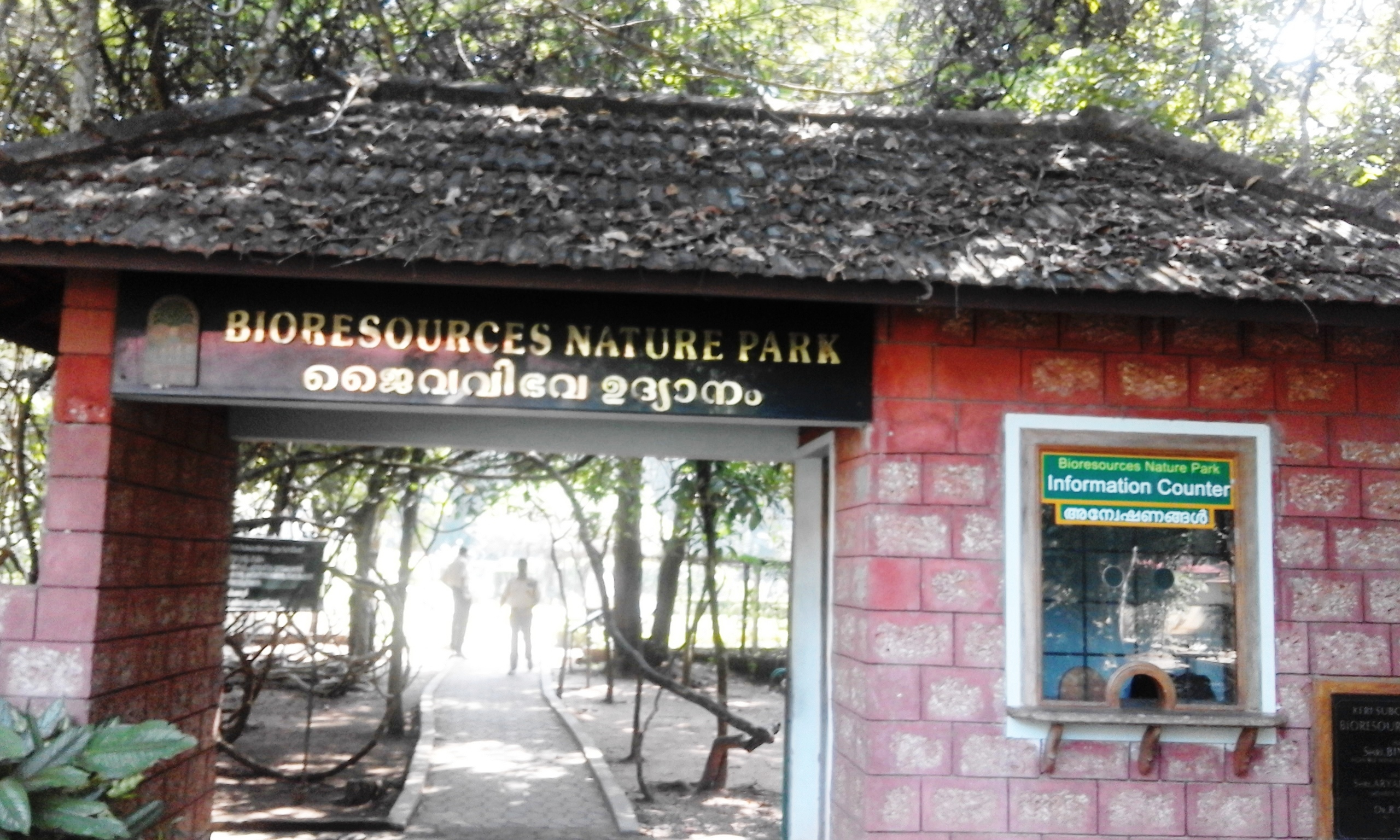
Teak Museum

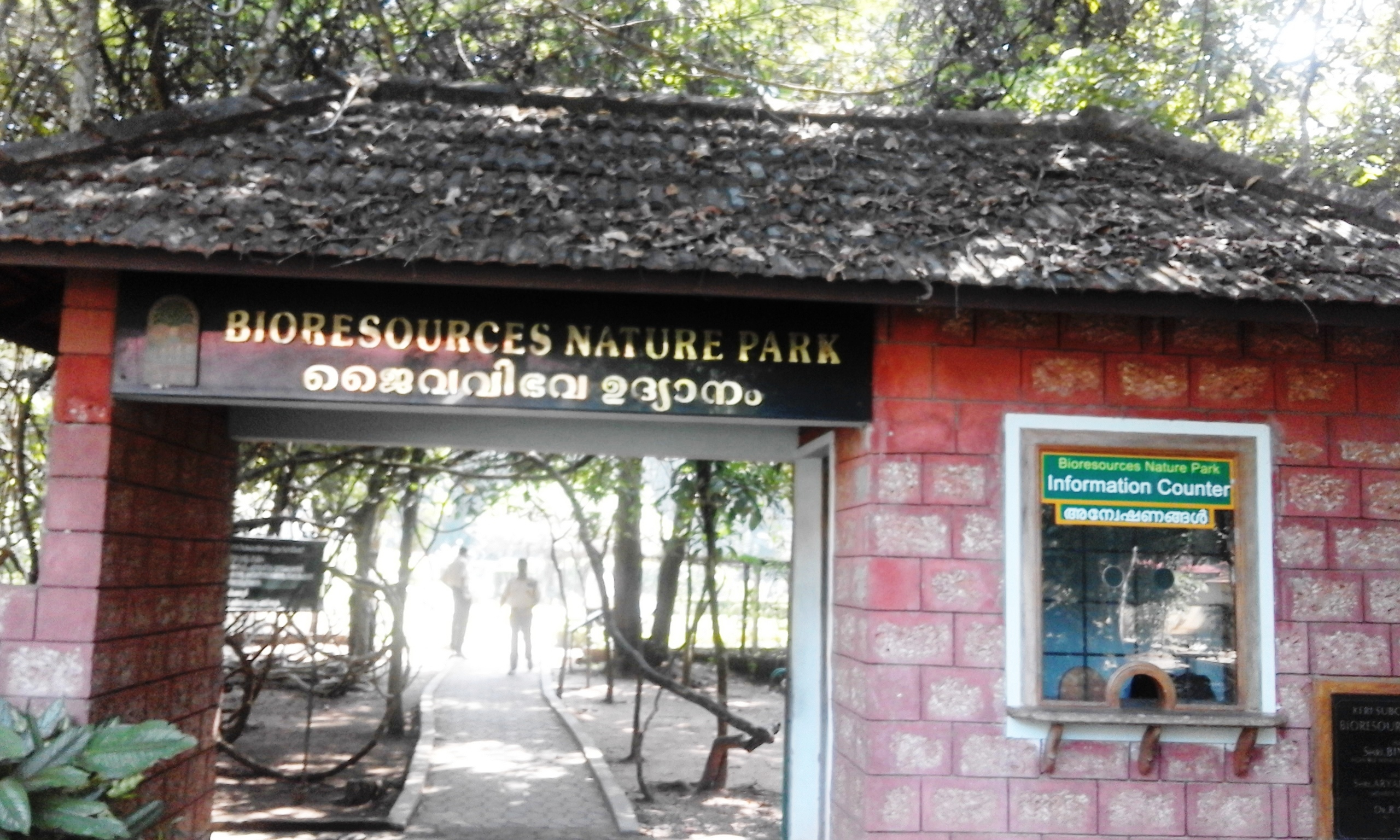
Nature Park

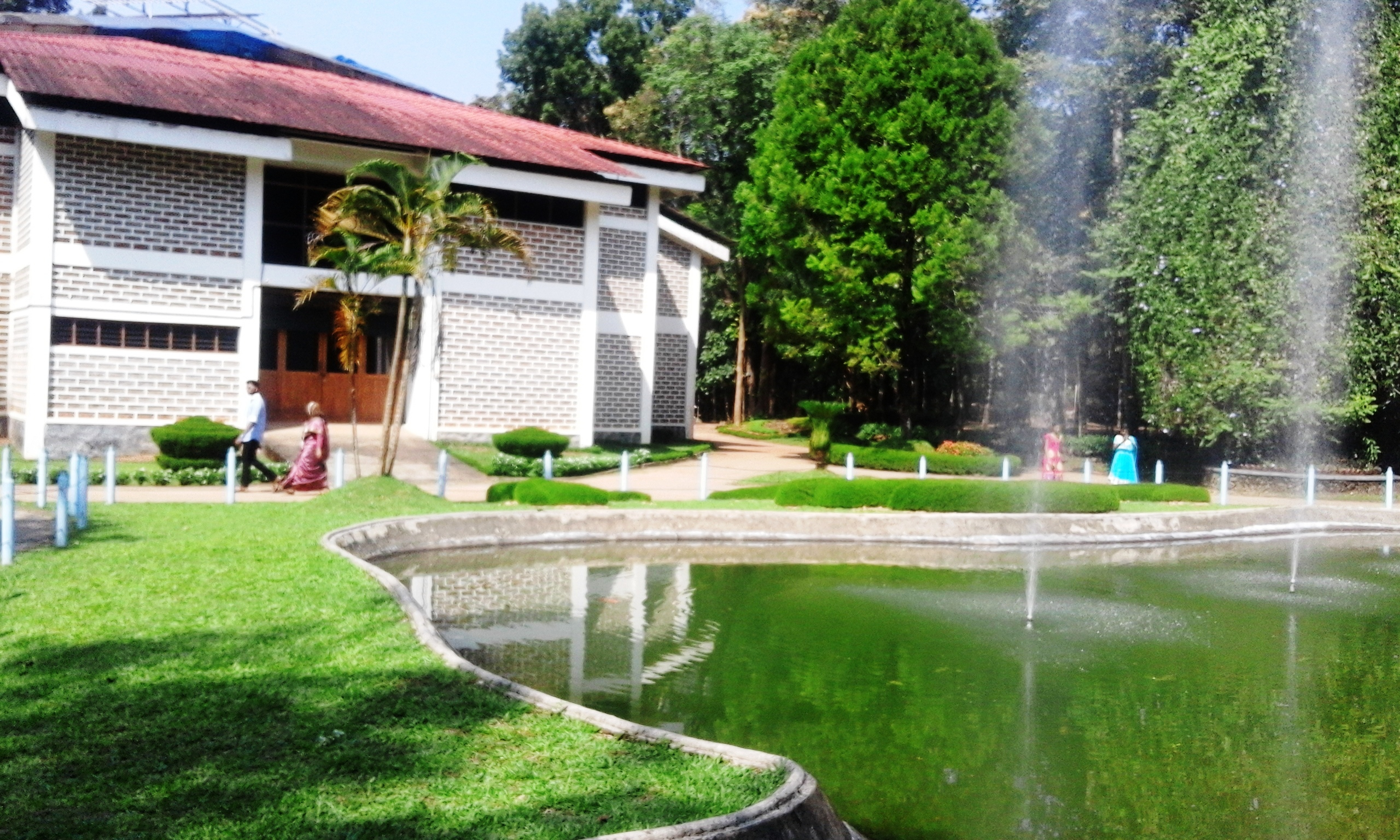
Back of Museum

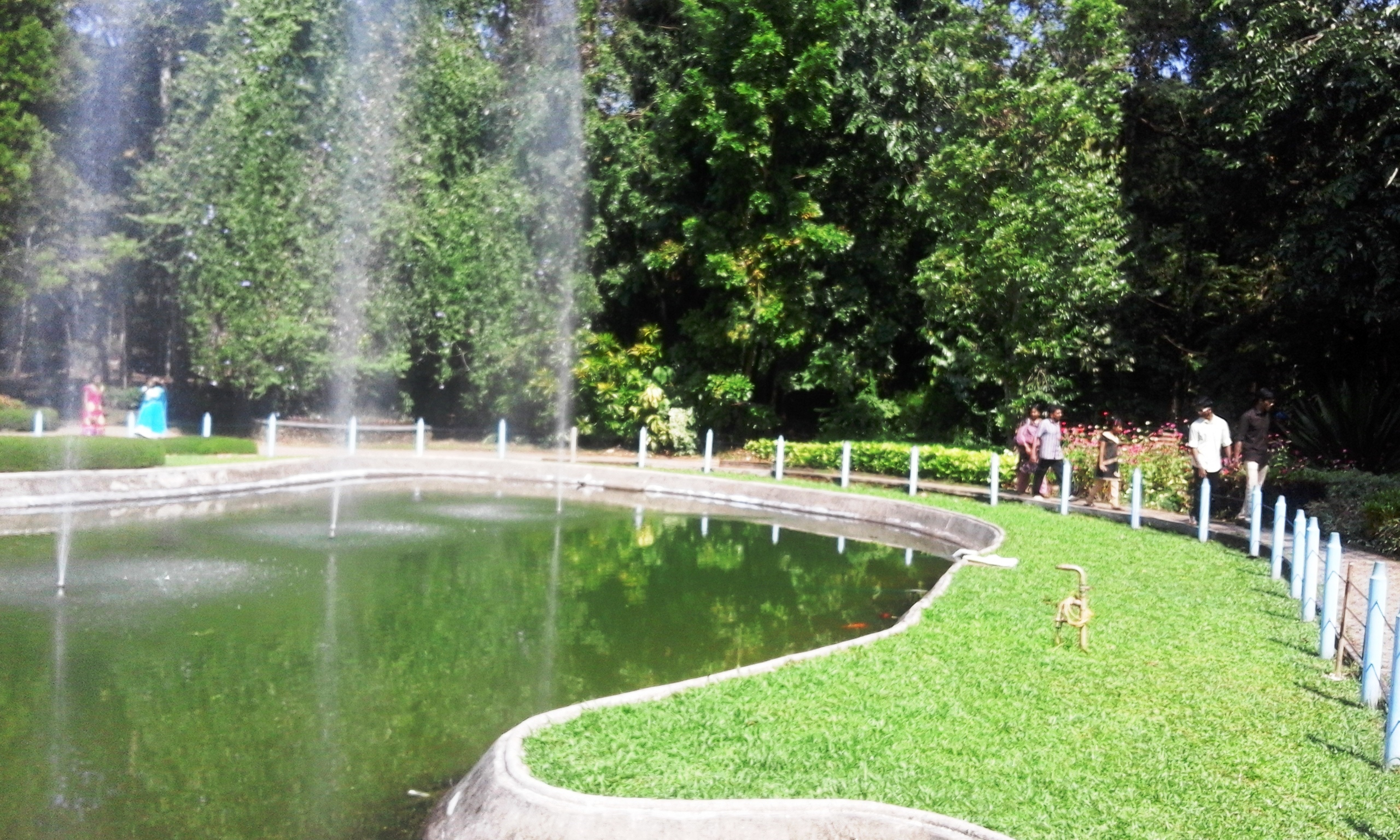
Fourth Garden

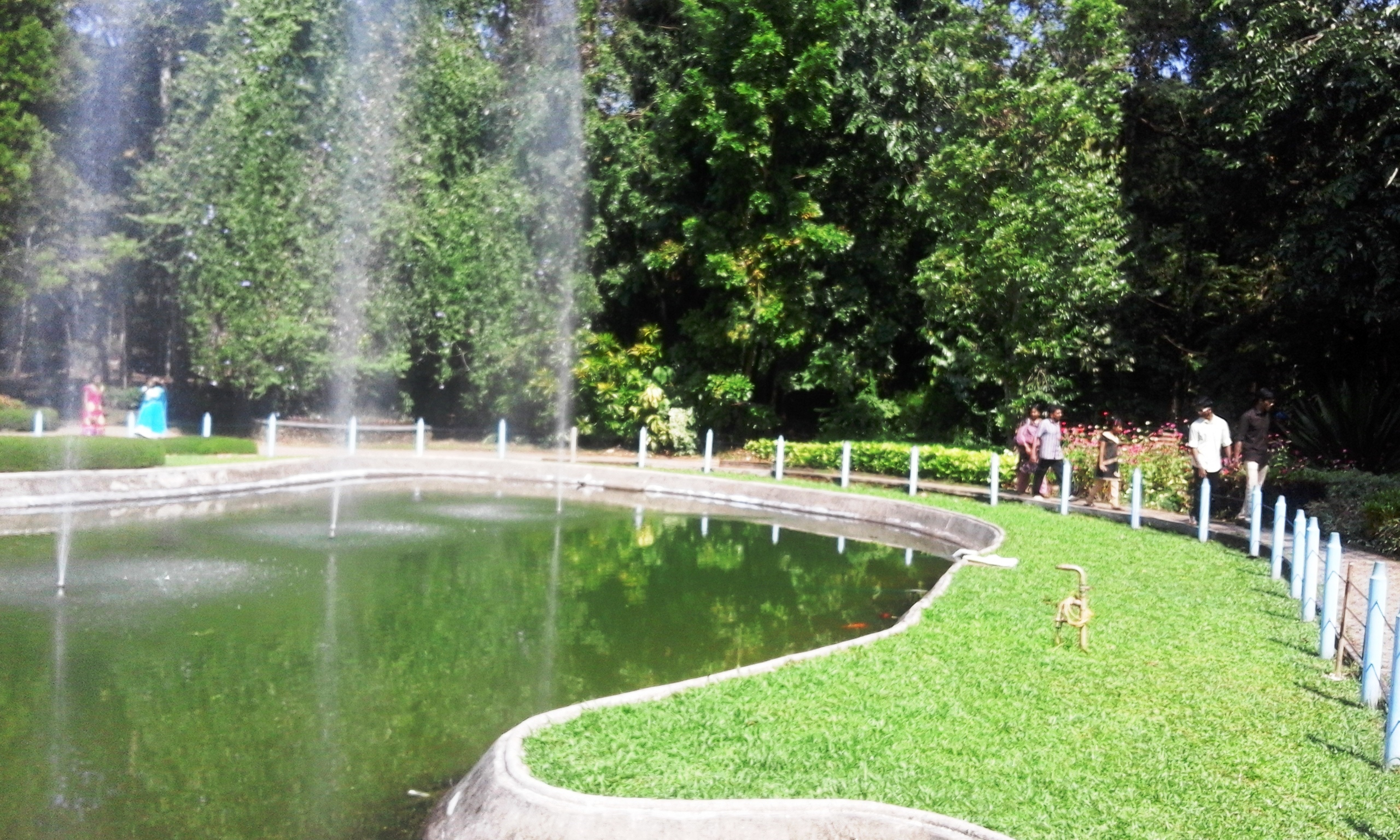
Inside the fourth park
