= Nilambur–Nanjangud line =

Indian railway project

Nilambur–Nanjangud line also called The golden I. T. corridor or Wayanad Railway, was a railway project to create a 5 ft 6in broad gauge rail connection from the town of Nanjangud (Karnataka) to Nilambur (Kerala) through Wayanad district of Kerala and Nilgiri district of Tamil Nadu.

The first proposal for such a line dates back to 1881.Dmrcl has started a detailed survey. Kerala government sanctioned 10 crore rupees for this survey. This railway having a length of 236 km starting from Nanjangud near Mysuru passing through Sulthan Bathery in Wayanad district of Kerala, and Devala in Nilgiri District of Tamil Nadu and reaching at Nilambur in Kerala is technically feasible as per the Kerala government. This BG line would join the existing railhead at Nilambur and lead to Thiruvananthapuram. The estimated cost of this railway is Rs.4266 crores. During 2010 the Planning Commission has sanctioned the estimated project cost of this proposed railway. This saves about 70 km from Kerala to Bangalore and saves 360 km to Mysore.

This financial estimate was found to be economically non-feasible by the railways and the project was shelved.

== Government approval ==
On 2 January 2014 the government of Kerala decided to share the cost of this railway project. Chief Minister Oommen Chandy, in a letter to Railway Minister Mallikarjun Kharge, expressed the state's willingness to share the project's cost. He also asked the railway minister to ensure that the first phase, (Nanjangud–Sulthan Bathery) estimated to cost Rs.641.78 crore.

However, the government of Karnataka and Tamil Nadu have not come forward to share the cost of the railway line. The project has come to standstill due to lack of forest clearance since the line will pass through the protected areas

== Ecosystem concerns ==
The new railway would reduce the vehicular traffic in NH-67 and NH-212 since a major chunk of commuters and carriers would shift to railways per the Kerala government.

However, wildlife biologists and conservationists contend that the traffic on the national highways passing through Bandipur tiger reserve is already diverted through alternate roads developed by the Government of Karnataka during night due to the already existing night closure of the highways through Bandipur from 9pm to 6am.

The Nanjangud–Nilambur line was also rejected by the High Court of Kerala in its WP 602/2013. The judgement specifically stated "It is also pertinent to mention that there is a road connectivity between these two places and it is not a case where other form of transportation is missing or unavailable. Merely because there is a ban for night transportation on the roads, railway connectivity could not become the need of the hour."

== Ecological concerns ==
Conservation biologists and ecologists have raised concerns about the ecological impact on the proposed railway line. Over 22 km of the railway line passing through the Bandipur tiger reserve and Waynad wildlife sanctuary will mean wildlife mortality due to railway collision almost on a daily basis.

== Alignment ==
Nilambur - Meppadi - Kalpetta - Sulthan Bathery - Muthanga - Gundlupete - Nanjangud

== Financial viability ==
It is estimated that more than 50,000 people are daily commuting to Mysore and Bangalore from Malabar and Nilgiri region. Around 240 buses are plying to Mysore and Bangalore through NH-212 and NH-67 from this region. By the inception of new railway line journey from Sulthan Bathery to Mysore would take just 1 hour and Bangalore 3 hours. The journey from Devala (Gudalur Road) would take 30 minutes more. Ooty could be reached from Gudalur Road in one and a half hour drive so that this rail would be the favourite destination of tourists. More than 800 trucks are passing through NH212 in one direction through Wayanad daily. About 700 trucks are reaching Gudalur through NH67. Destination of this freight is the neighbouring 8 districts. Considering the logistic movement currently in NH 212 and NH67 which is expected to be shifted to the railway and expected increase by the introduction of railway, the freight revenue would be multi fold of the travel revenue.

== See also ==
- Category:Cancelled railway lines
