= Karimpuzha Wildlife Sanctuary =

Wildlife sanctuary near Nilambur, Malappuram district

Karimpuzha Wildlife sanctuary
- IUCN category IV (habitat/species management area)
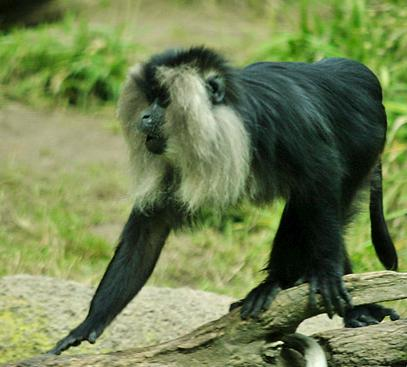

- Location within Kerala Location within India
- Interactive map of Karimpuzha Wildlife sanctuary
- Location: Nilambur, Malappuram district, Kerala, India
- Area: 227.97 km^{2} (88.0 sq mi)
- Established: 2020

Karimpuzha Wildlife Sanctuary is a wildlife sanctuary on the western slopes of Nilgiris.

== Geography ==
The sanctuary lies between the geographical limits of N 11°23' 15" to 11°12' 43" latitudes and E 76°22' 37" to 76°33' 2" longitudes and falls in the Nilambur Taluk of Malappuram Revenue District in Kerala. Karimpuzha WLS area forms part of the revenue villages of Karulai, Moothedam and Amarambalam. The sharp topographical gradient of the hills ranging from 40 m to 2550 m is the primary reason for the unique biodiversity of the Karimpuzha WLS.

== Ecological significance ==
The Karimpuzha WLS links the Silent Valley National Park in Kerala and Mukurthi National Park in Tamil Nadu and thereby create a contiguous protective area stretch. It also borders the Mukkuruthi National Park in the south and the Silent Valley National Park buffer zone in the northeast. Also, the New Amarambalam reserve which is part of the Karimpuzha wildlife sanctuary has one of the most pristine forests untouched by humans.

The landscape of the wildlife sanctuary ranges from 40m to 2,654m above sea level and hence have a huge altitudinal gradient. The Karimpuzha sanctuary is also the only forest stretch in Kerala where seven forest types are all present- Semi-evergreen forest, Evergreen rainforest, moist deciduous forest, sub-tropical savannah, sub-tropical hill forest, montane wet temperate forest and montane wet grasslands.

== Fauna ==
The Karimpuzha wildlife sanctuary has almost all the mammals endemic to Western Ghats including the Nilgiri Tahr and Lion-tailed macaque. The wildlife sanctuary is home to 226 bird, 213 butterfly species, 23 species amphibian species, 33 reptile species and several endangered fish species.

== See also ==
- Silent Valley National Park
- Mukurthi National Park
