= Flycatcher =

Flycatcher may refer to:

== Birds ==
=== Major flycatcher families ===
- Old World flycatchers, Muscicapidae
- Tyrant flycatchers, Tyrannidae

=== Minor flycatcher families ===
- Fairy flycatchers, Stenostiridae
- Monarch flycatchers, Monarchidae
- Silky-flycatchers, Ptiliogonatidae
- Yellow flycatchers, Erythrocercidae

=== Other birds known as flycatchers ===
- Flycatcher thrushes or Rufous thrushes, in the thrush family Turdidae
- Flycatchers or flyrobins, in the Australasian robin family Petroicidae
- Bearded flycatchers or Myiobius, in the passerine family Tityridae
- Dohrn's flycatcher or Dohrn's thrush-babbler, in the warbler genus Sylvia

== Other uses ==
- Cephalotus follicularis, also known as the Australian flycatcher plant or pitcher plant
- Fairey Flycatcher, British fighter aircraft of the 1920s–1930s
- Flycatcher (comics), character in the Vertigo comic book Fables
- Flycatcher (radar), short-range air defense fire control system
- Fly-killing device
- HMS Flycatcher, former UK military base
- The Frog Prince, fairy tale, some of whose versions are dubbed "Flycatcher"
