= Adyanpara Falls =

Catching waterfall in Kerala, India

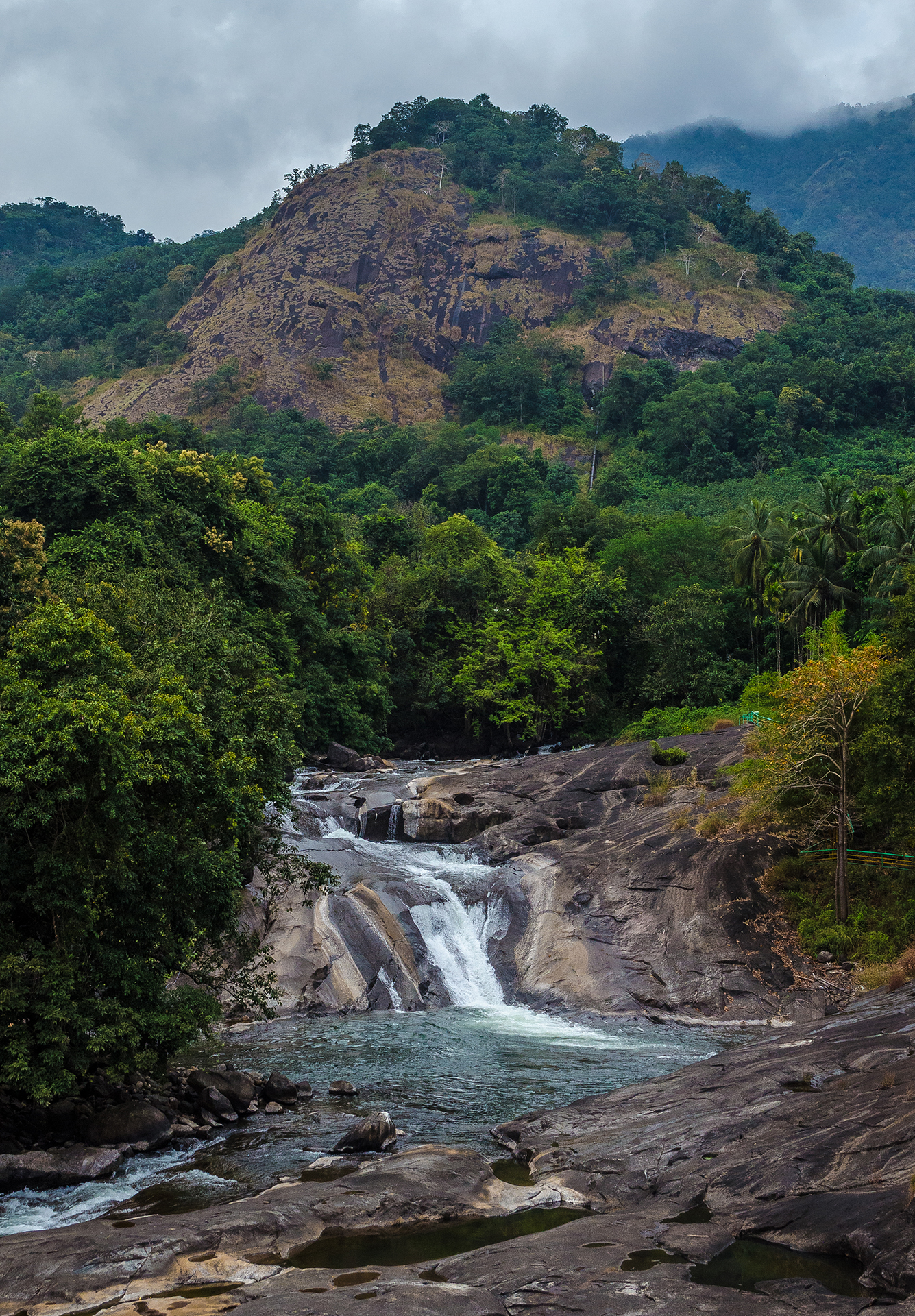
- Interactive map of Adyanpara Falls
- Location: Adyanpara, Nilambur Taluk, Malappuram District, Kerala, India
- Coordinates: 11°21′16″N 76°12′12″E
- Type: Cascading
- Watercourse: Kanjirapuzha River

Adyanpara Falls is a cascading waterfall in the Kurmbalangodu village of Nilambur taluk in Kerala, India. It is 14 kilometres (8.7 mi) from Nilambur town, and attracts tourists from various parts of Kerala. This is a seasonal waterfall. During Summer, water flow is low. This waterfall is of a natural cascading style as the waterfall descends over the rock. Adyanpara Weir is situated near to this falls.

== See also ==
- List of waterfalls
- List of waterfalls in India
