= Kerala Forest Research Institute =

Research organization based in Thrissur, Kerala, India

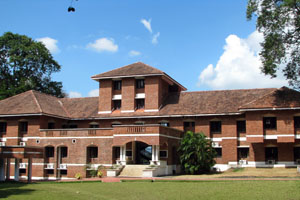
KFRI

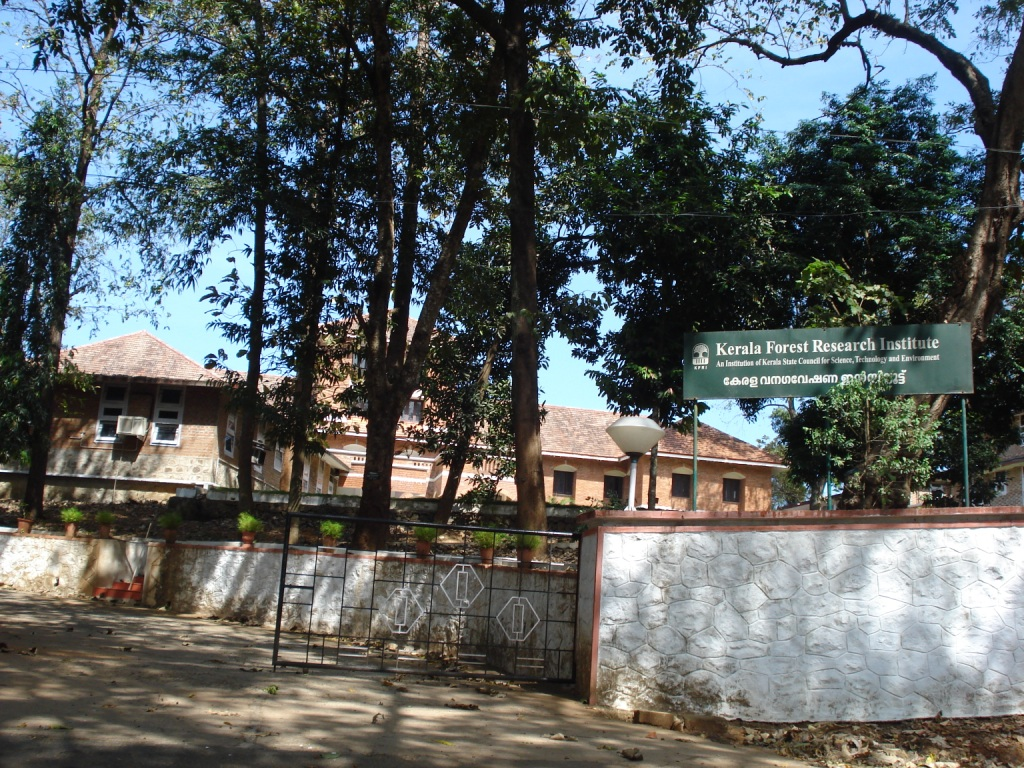
Entrance of Kerala Forest Research Institute

The Kerala Forest Research Institute (KFRI) is an organisation based in Peechi, in Thrissur, India. It was established in 1975 by the Government of Kerala as part of its Science and Technology Department, and in 2003 became part of the KSCSTE.

The institute carries out research, training and extension on a range of disciplines related to tropical forests and forestry. Besides its main campus at Peechi in Thrissur District, a sub-centre has been established at Nilambur and a field research centre at Palapilly, in the Thrissur district. The main campus situated on the Thrissur-Peechi road has the main administrative offices, research divisions, laboratories, nurseries, greenhouses, museums, guest houses and the Kerala Forest Seed Centre. The sub-centre at Nilambur has the Teak Museum and the Bio-resources Nature Trail that attracts many visitors. The field research center has the "Bambusetum" with a collection of 65 species of tropical bamboo, an arboretum and the Bamboo Primary Processing Centre.

The institute also hosts the following international/national offices:

- Teaknet – the International Teak Information Network supported by the FAO, Rome
- Bamboo Technical Support Group supported by National Bamboo Mission, New Delhi
- Journal of Bamboo and Rattan
- Bamboo Information Centre – India

In August 2019, a group of scientists of the Kerala Forest Research Institute (KFRI) collaborated with Ghent University, Belgium, to study the consequences of climate change on different ecosystems, especially mangroves on the coastal areas of the State.

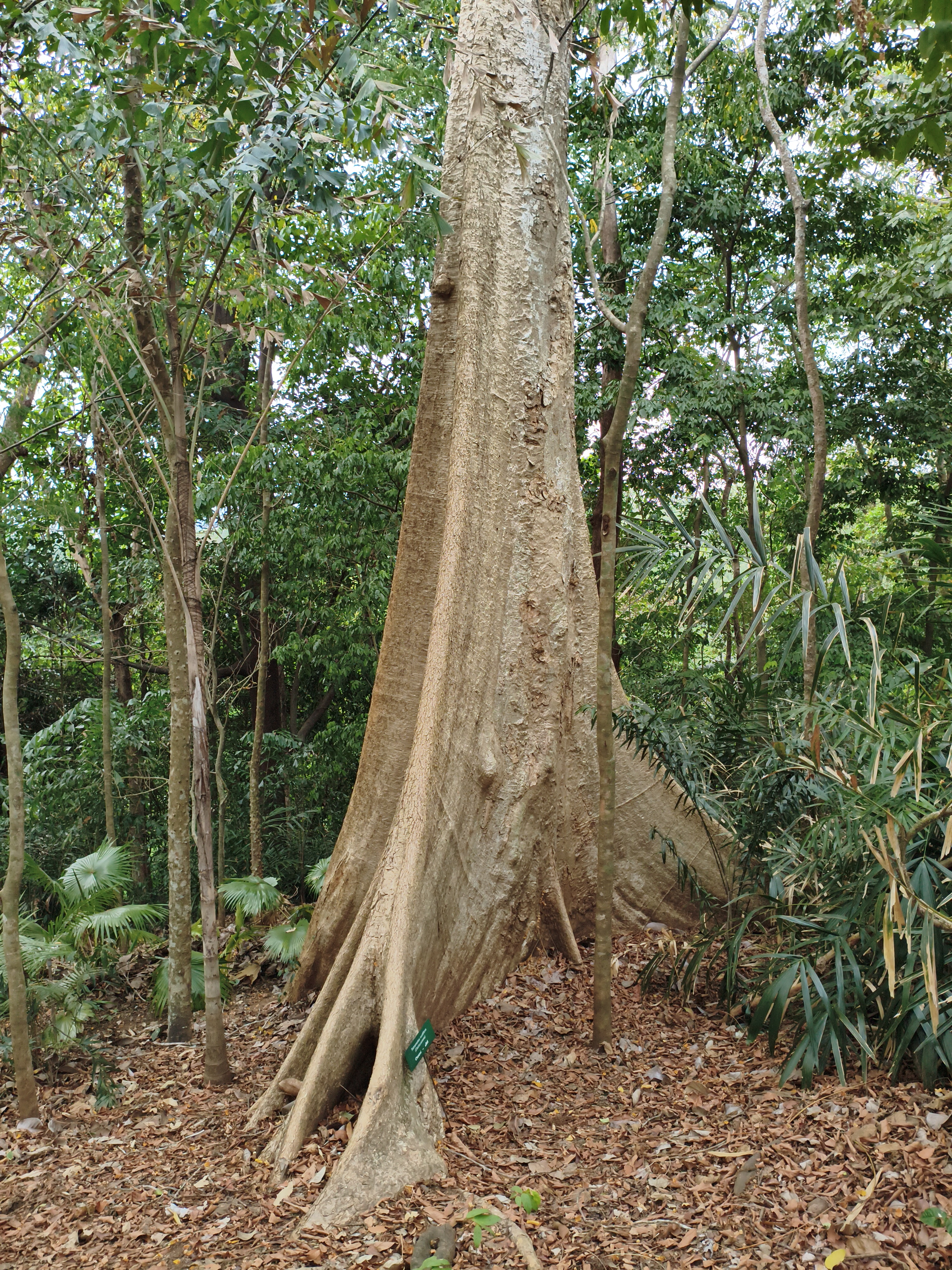
Tree in the KFRI Campus

== See also ==
- Protected areas of Kerala
- Teak Museum
- Wildlife of Kerala
- List of Kerala State Government Organizations
- Kerala Soil Museum
- Arid Forest Research Institute
- Indian Council of Forestry Research and Education
- Van Vigyan Kendra (VVK) Forest Science Centres
- Kerala Agricultural University
