= Nilambur =

- Town / Municipality
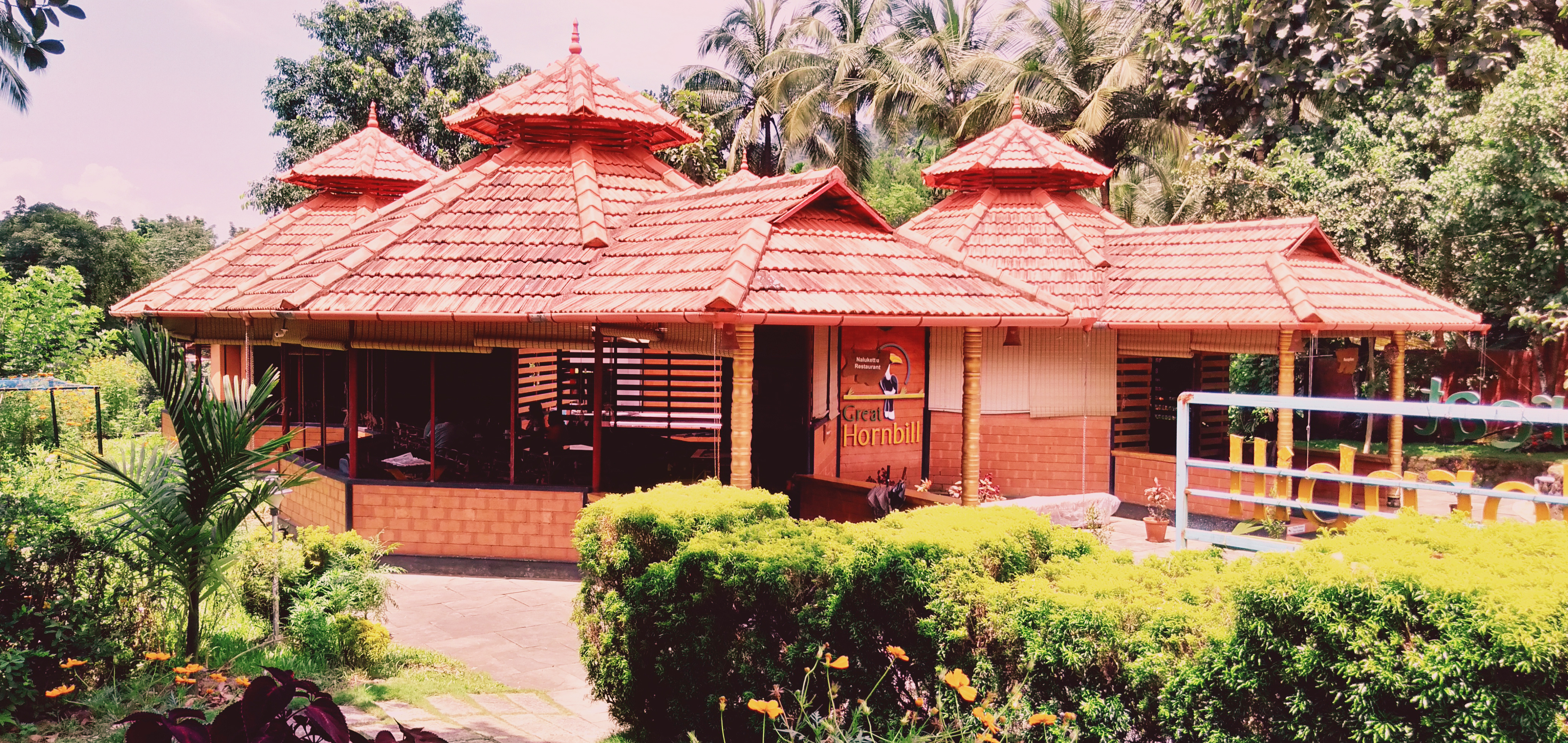
- A resort at Nilambur
- Nickname: The Teak Town
- Location in Kerala Location in India
- Coordinates: 11.2855°N 76.2386°E
- Country: India
- State: Kerala
- District: Malappuram
- Taluk: Nilambur

Government
  - Type: Municipal council
  - Body: Nilambur Municipality
  - Chairperson: Padmini Gopinath (INC)
  - Vice Chairperson: Shoukath ali Koomanchery (IUML)
  - MLA: Aryadan Shoukath (INC)

Area
  - Total: 30.79 km^{2} (11.89 sq mi)
- Elevation: 50.53 m (165.8 ft)

Population (2011)
  - Total: 46,366
- Postal codes: 679329, 679330
- Vehicle registration: KL-71
- Website: nilamburmunicipality.lsgkerala.gov.in/en

Nilambur (Malayalam: [n̪ilɐmbuːr]) is a major town, a municipality and a taluk in the Malappuram district of the Indian state of Kerala. It is located close to the Nilgiris range of the Western Ghats on the banks of the Chaliyar River. This place is also known as 'Teak Town' because of the abundance of Nilambur teaks, which is a variety of a large, deciduous tree that occurs in mixed hardwood forests. Unlike many municipalities of India, Nilambur is covered with large amounts of vegetation, making it very scenic.

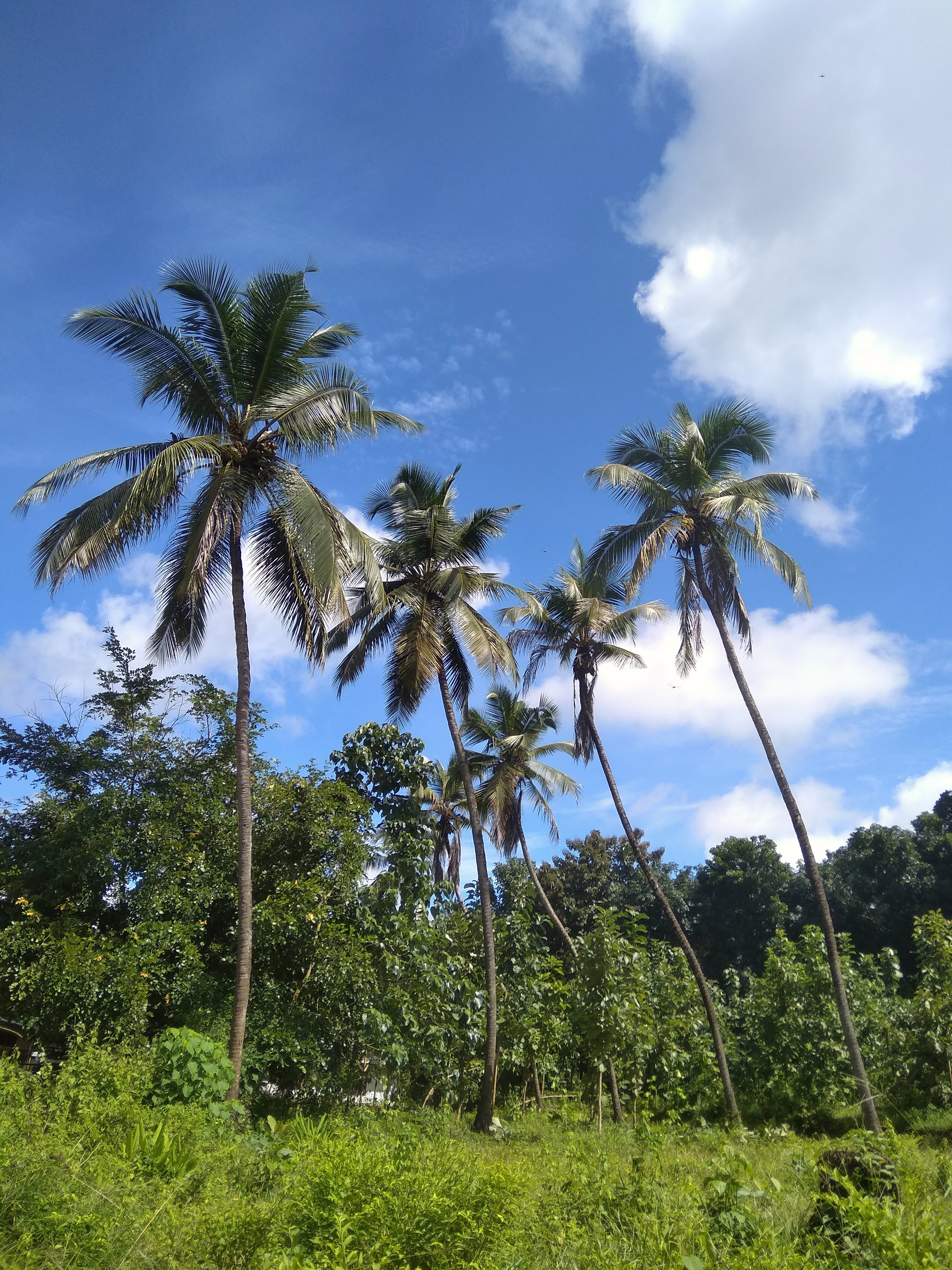
Nilambur

In the British records, Nilambur and its surroundings are collectively described as Nilambur Valley. The bank of river Chaliyar at Nilambur region is also known for natural gold fields. Explorations done at the valley of the river Chaliyar in Nilambur has shown reserves of the order of 2.5 million cubic meters of placers with 0.1 gram per cubic meter of gold. The hilly forested area of Nilambur Taluk forms a portion of the Nilgiri Biosphere Reserve of rich biodiversity. Nilambur is located about 90 km (56 mi) west of Ooty and 48 km (30 mi) southwest of Gudalur town, and 27 km (17 mi) northeast of Manjeri, on Ooty-Gudalur-Nilambur-Calicut road.

The 2,554 m (8,379 ft) m high Mukurthi peak, which is situated in the border of Nilambur Taluk and Ooty Taluk, and is also the fifth-highest peak in South India as well as the third-highest in Kerala after Anamudi (2,696 m [8,845 ft]) and Meesapulimala (2,651 m [8,698 ft]), is the highest point of elevation in Malappuram district. It is also the highest peak in Kerala outside the Idukki district. The 2,383 m (7,818 ft) high Anginda peak, which is located closer to Malappuram-Palakkad-Nilgiris district border is the second-highest peak. Vavul Mala, a 2,339 m [7,674 ft] high peak situated on the trijunction of Nilambur Taluk of Malappuram, Wayanad, and Thamarassery Taluk of Kozhikode districts, is the third-highest point of elevation in the district. The Nilambur Taluk has several small and medium-sized tributaries of Chaliyar river.

UNESCO has included Nilambur in its Global Network of Learning Cities (GNLC) in recognition of its outstanding efforts to make lifelong learning a reality for all at the local level.

== Etymology ==
It is believed that Nilambur was derived from Nilambapuri, the old name of Nilambur Kingdom.

== History ==
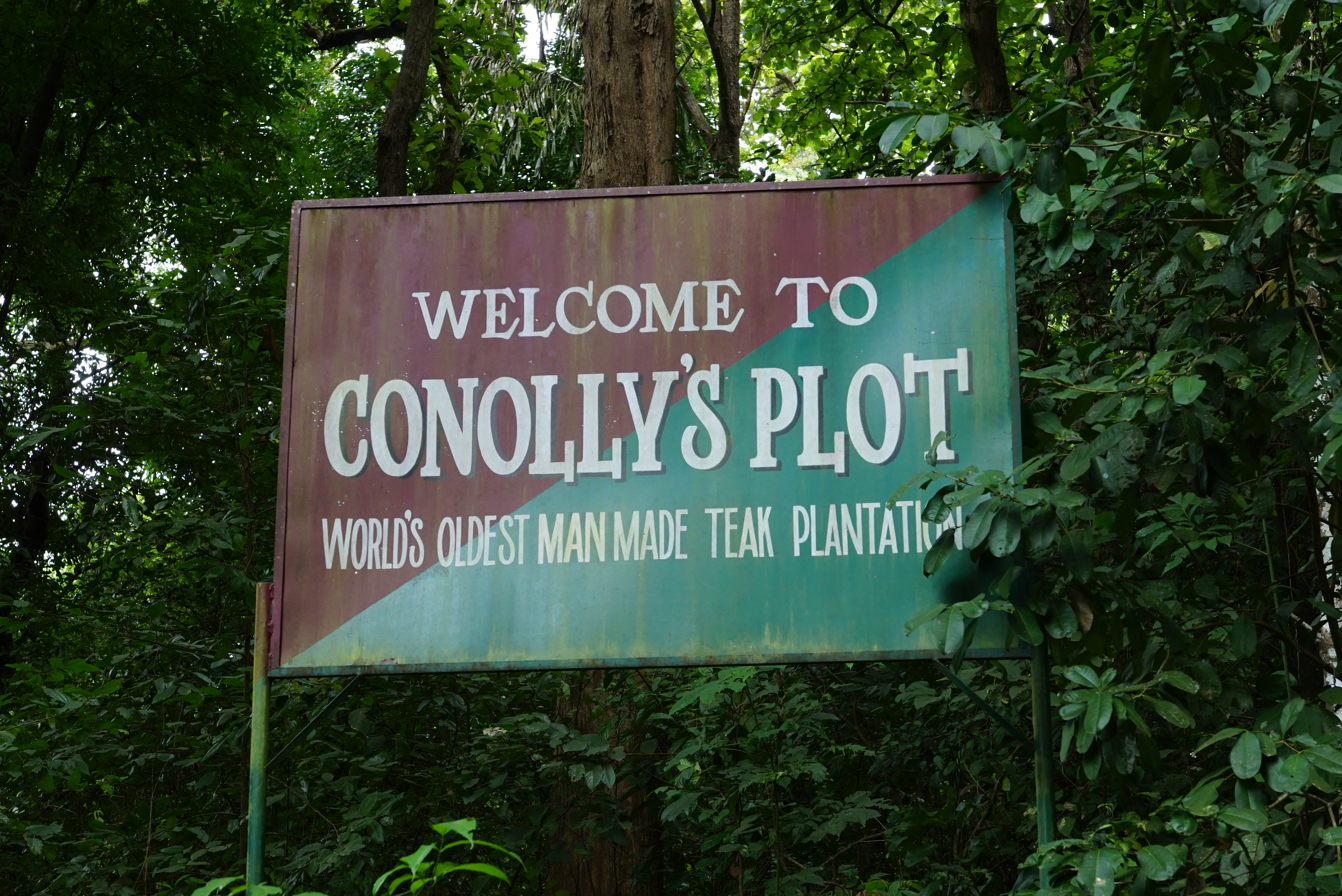
Conolly's plot, Nilambur

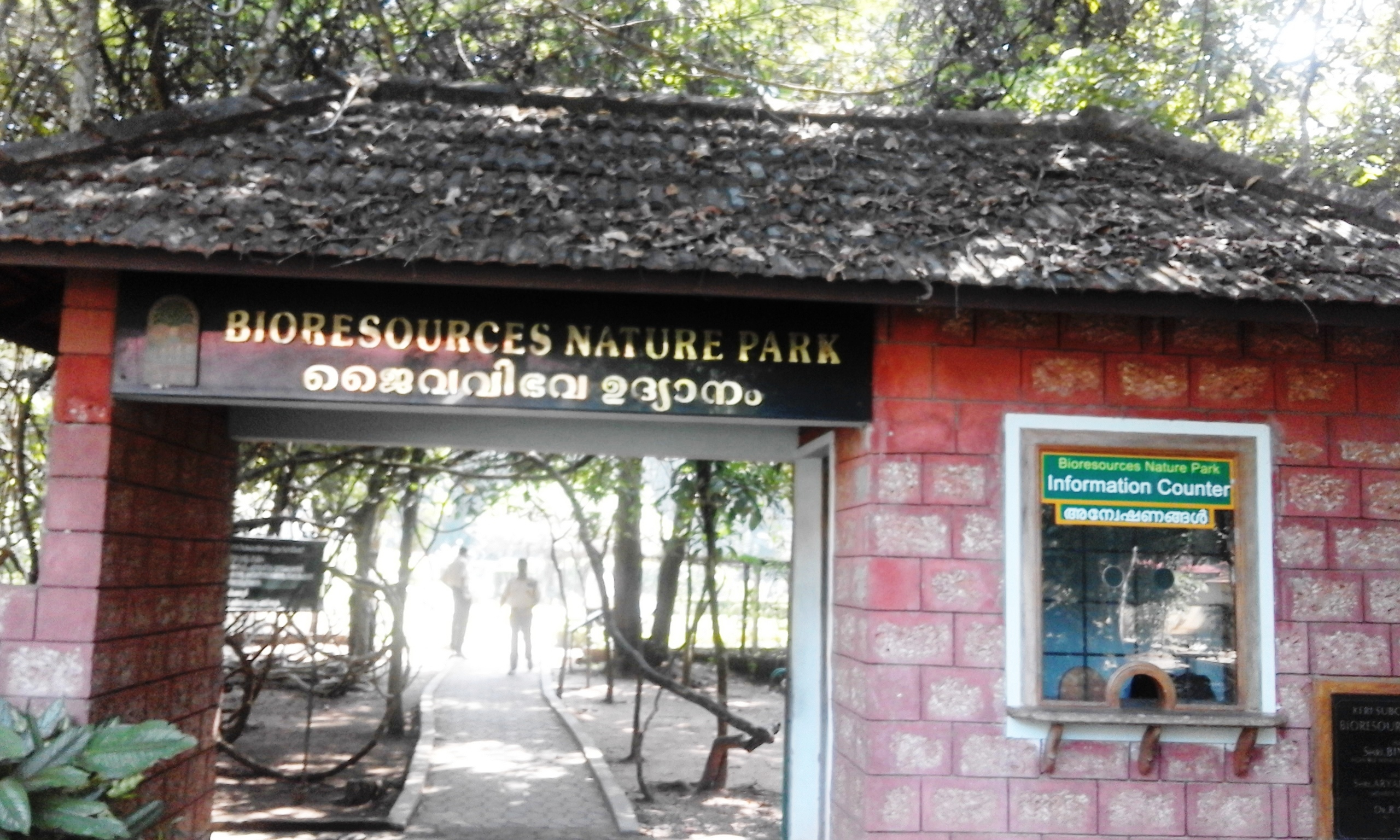
Teak Museum

The teaks for the construction of Uru, a kind of ships those were used for maritime trade through Beypore port, were usually taken from Nilambur Teak Forests. The oldest teak plantation of the world in the Conolly's plot is just two km (1.2 mi) from the town. It was named in memory of Henry Valentine Conolly, the then Malabar district collector. Teak Museum at Nilambur is maintained by the Kerala Forest Research Institute which was established for the memory of the oldest known Teak plantation in the world. The town is also famous for Nilambur Kovilakam, where the Nilambur Rajas resided and ruled the land. Nilambur Rajas were vassals to the Zamorins of Calicut, based at Nilambur.

The Nilambur–Shoranur line is among the shortest as well as picturesque broad gauge railway lines in India. It was laid by the British in colonial era for the transportation of Nilambur Teak logs into United Kingdom through Kozhikode. During British rule, Nilambur's chief importance laid in producing teaks. In the old administrative records of the Madras Presidency, it is recorded that the most remarkable plantation owned by Government in the erstwhile Madras Presidency was the Teak plantation at Nilambur planted in 1844.

Nilambur Teak is the first forest produce to get its own GI tag.

On 2nd September 2022, Nilambur joined the UNESCO Global Network of Learning Cities (GNLC).

The Nilambur plates were discovered in this city.

== Civic administration ==
Nilambur Municipality

=== Nilambur Municipality Election 2020 ===
S.No.	Party name	Party symbol	Number of Councillors
02	Independents		14
02	LDF		09
03	UDF		09
04	BJP		01

== Connectivity ==
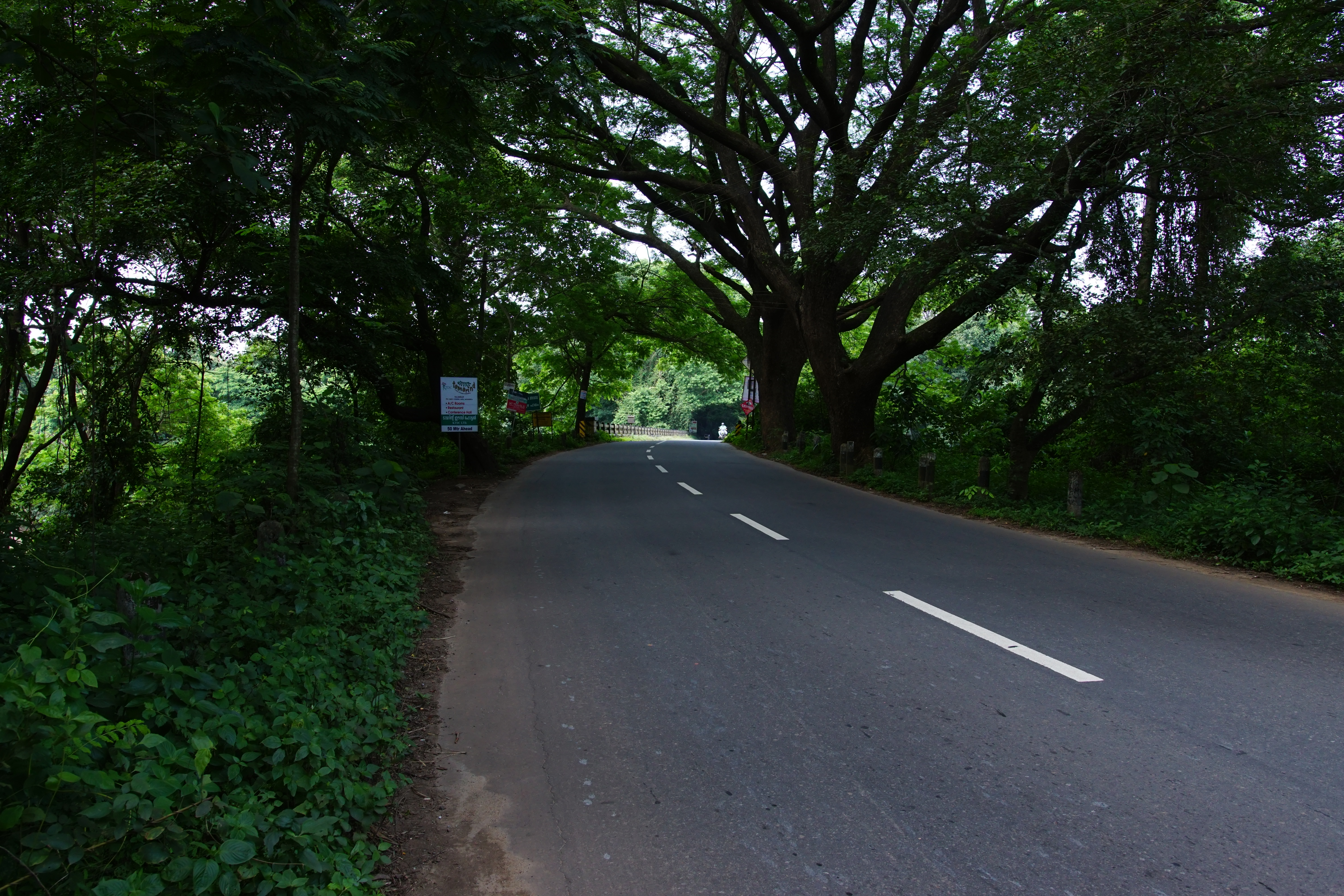
A road in Nilambur

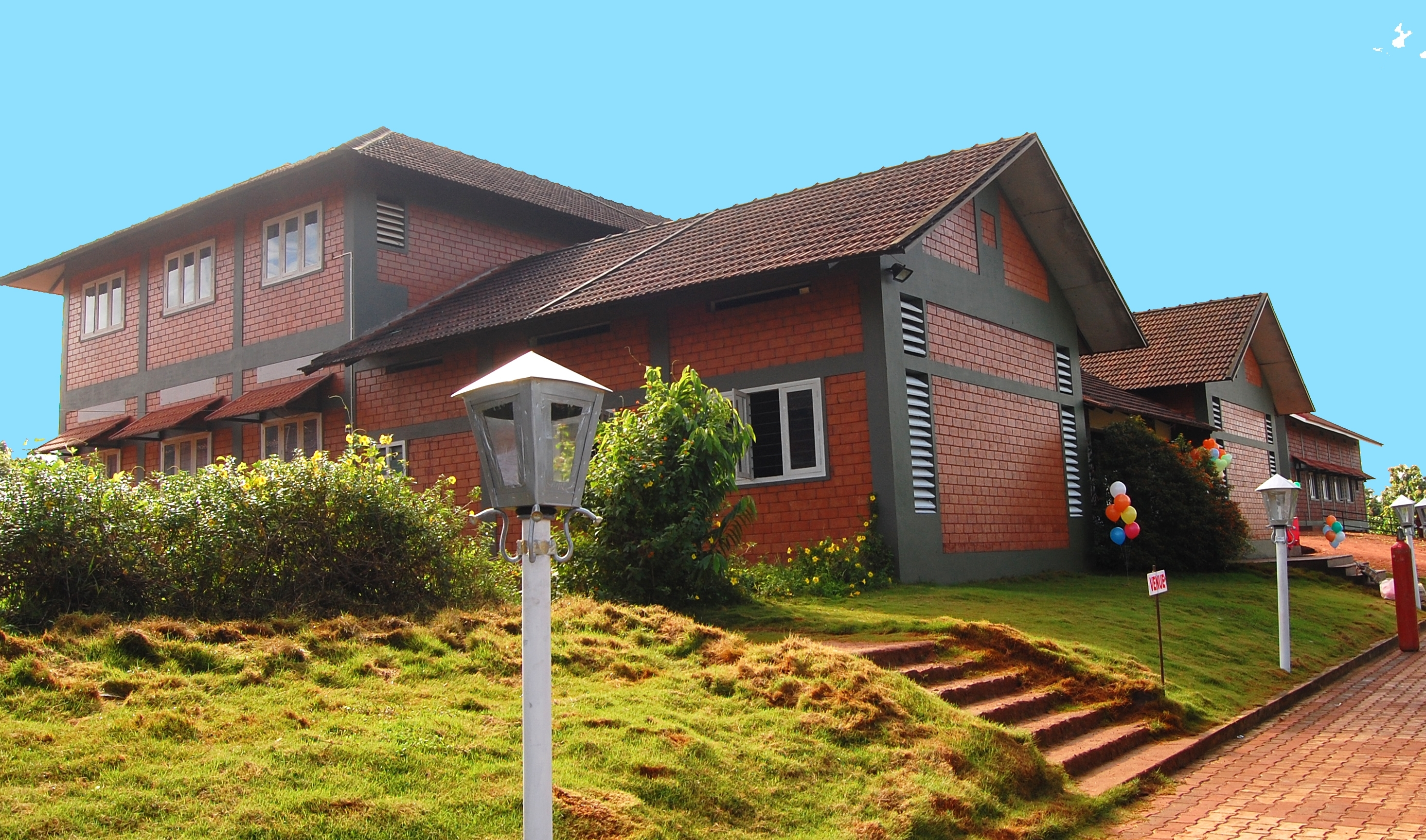
The main block of Amal college of Advanced studies in Nilambur

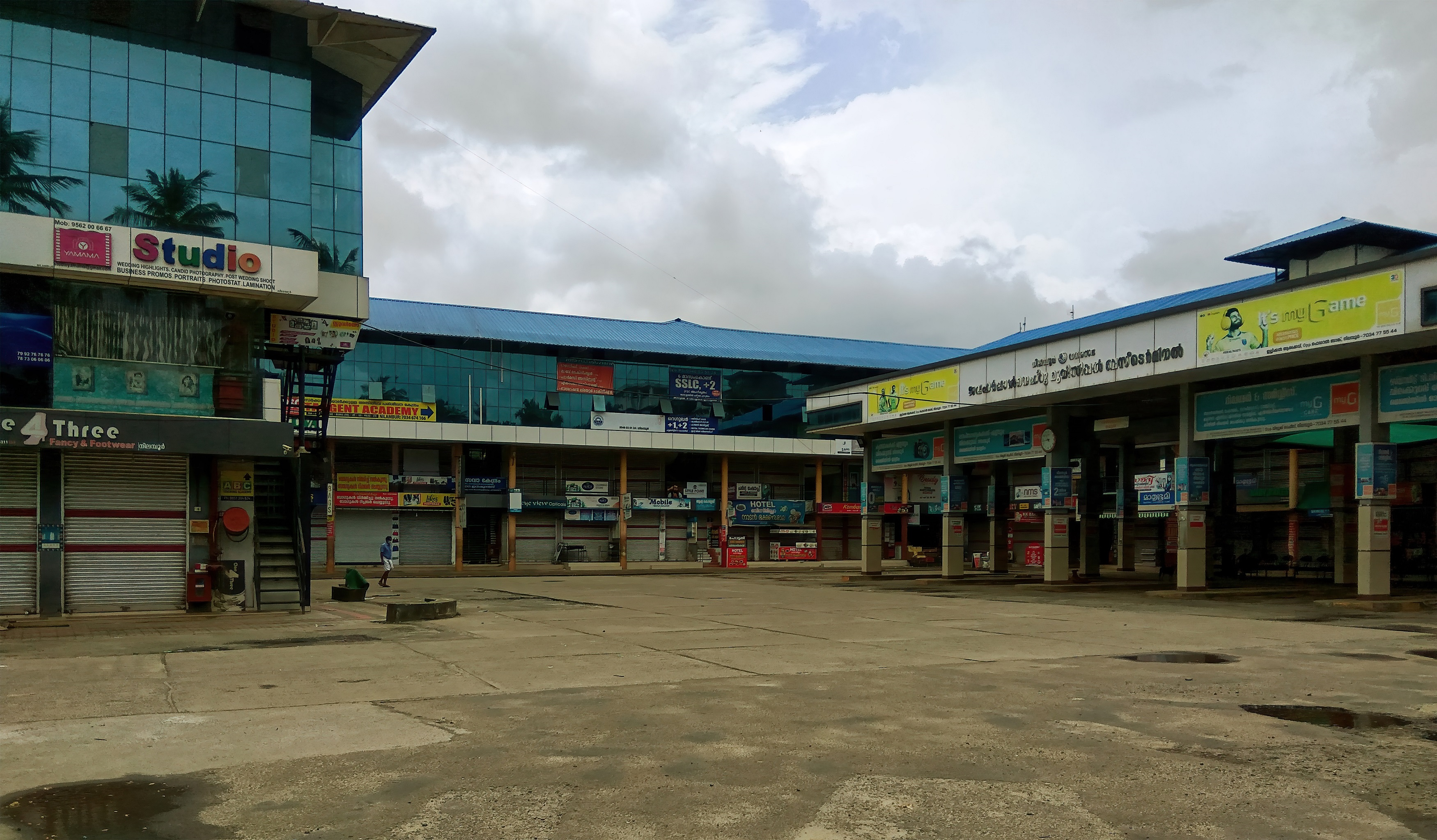
Jawaharlal Nehru Municipal Bus Stand at Nilambur

Nilambur is well connected to other parts of the Kerala and other parts of the country by road and rail networks. Kozhikode-Nilambur-Gudalur (SH 28) road which is a major interstate highway runs through the heart of Nilambur. Other State highways such as SH 39 (Perumbilavu - Nilambur Road) and SH 73 (Valanchery - Nilambur Road) also serves this town. Construction for Hill Highway is ongoing here. There are also wide and good quality direct road towards Kakkadampoyil of Kozhikode district from here. There is a large fleet of government and private buses and other transports serving this town. There is a KSRTC sub depot which serves the area operating both interstate and intrastate Public bus transport. This town is also served by a railway station called Nilambur road which is the terminus of Nilambur–Shoranur railway line. This railway station connects this town to other parts of India as it has regular trains which leads to shoranur junction which is the largest railway station of Kerala state.

The Nilambur–Nanjangud line is a proposed railway line, which connects Nilambur with the districts of Wayanad, Nilgiris, and Mysore.

The nearest International Airport is Calicut International Airport at Karipur which is 44.50 km from Nilambur.

== Nilambur Taluk ==
Nilambur Taluk, in the eastern region of Malappuram district, is located in the rich biodiversity of Nilgiri Biosphere Reserve

Nilambur Taluk, also known as Eastern Eranad Taluk, comes under Perinthalmanna revenue division in Malappuram district of Kerala, India. Its headquarters is the town of Nilambur. Nilambur Taluk contains Nilambur Municipality and a few Gram panchayats. Most of the administrative offices are located in the Mini-Civil Station at Nilambur. The position of Nilambur Taluk in Malappuram district is shown below:

Nilambur Taluk is the largest Taluk in Kerala. It is composed of 21 villages. Since most of Nilambur is the jungle and hilly area, this Taluk has the least population density in the district. Several tributaries of Chaliyar River flow through Nilambur Taluk. Nilambur, Wandoor, Edakkara, Mambad, Kalikavu, and Karuvarakundu, are some major towns in Nilambur Taluk. Nilambur Taluk is bounded by Silent Valley National Park to south, Nilgiri mountain ranges and Pandalur, Gudalur, Ooty, and Kundah Taluks of Nilgiris district to east, Wayanad district and Thamarassery Taluk of Kozhikode district to north, and Eranad and Perinthalmanna Taluks to west. The villages included in the Taluk are:

- Vazhikkadavu
- Nilambur
- Kattumunda
- Edakkara
- Pullipadam
- Karulai
- Chungathara
- Thiruvali
- Karuvarakundu
- Amarambalam
- Mampad
- Kurumbalangode
- Akampadam
- Tuvvur
- Porur
- Vellayur
- Kalikavu
- Kerala Estate
- Pothukal
- Moothedam
- Wandoor
- Chokkad
- Elambilakode

== Places of Interest ==
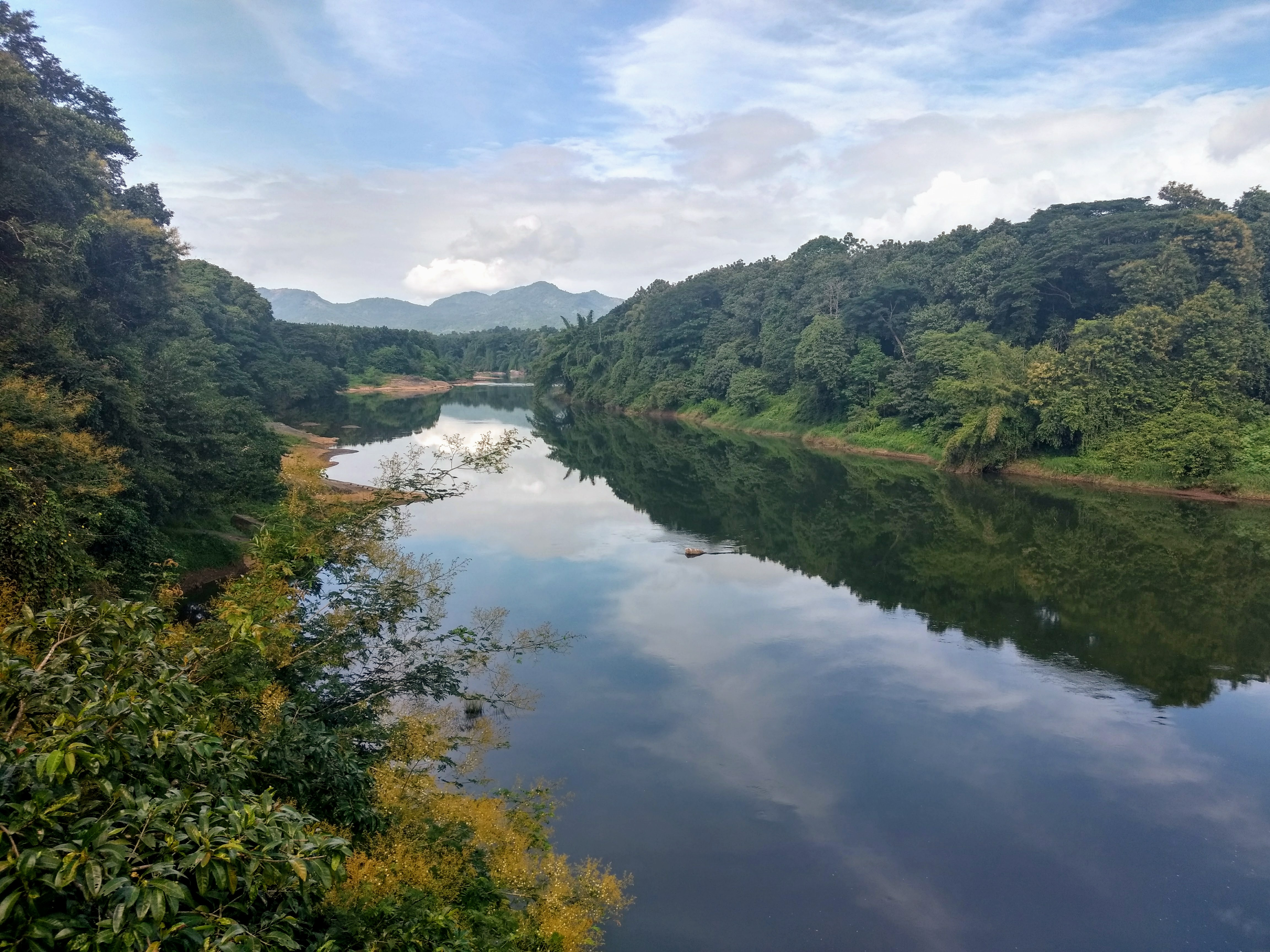
View of Chaliyar river at Nilambur

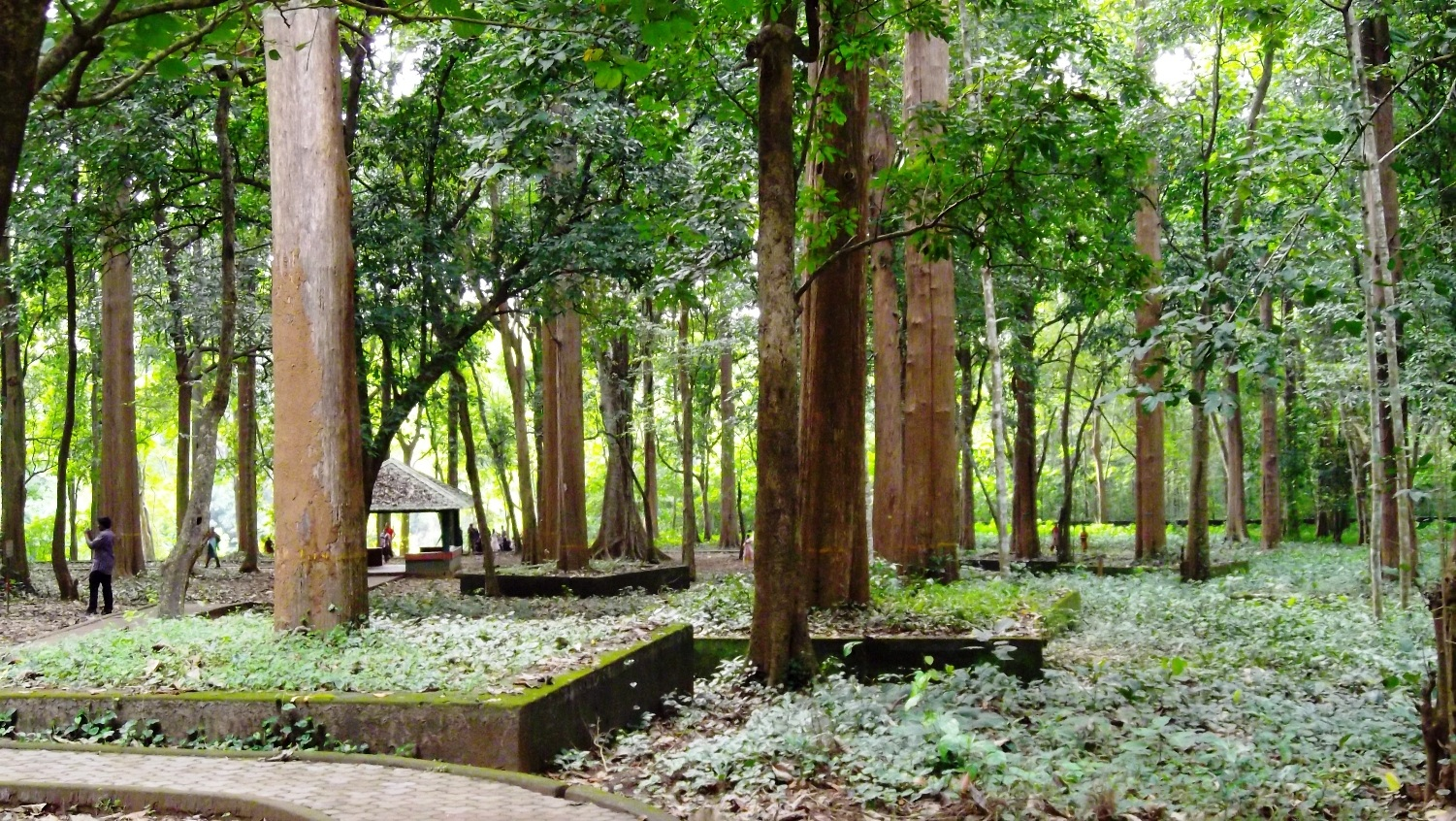
Teak forest at Conolly's plot

- Nilambur Teak Museum
- Conolly's Plot
- Bungalow Hill
- Nilambur Kovilakam
- Adyanpara Falls
- Karimpuzha Wildlife Sanctuary
- New Amarambalam Reserved Forest
- Mukurthi peak
- Vavul Mala
- Anginda peak
- Munderi Seed farm
- Nedumkayam Rain Forests
- Silent Valley National Park
- Chaliyar Mukku

=== Teak Museum ===
The oldest teak plantation in the world is at Conolly's plot. It has the Teak Museum close by.

=== Nilambur-Shoranur Railway line ===
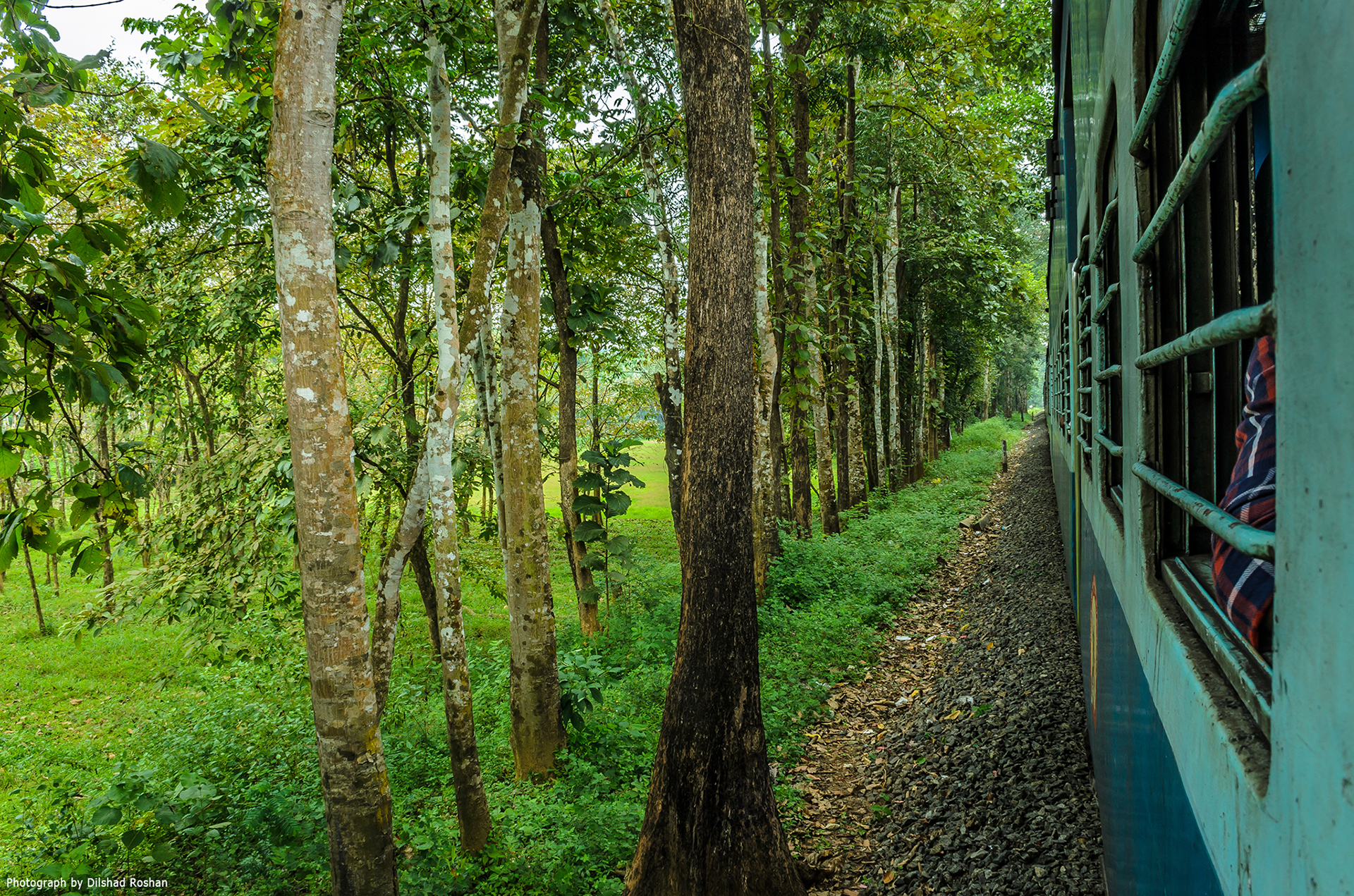
Nilambur–Shoranur line

The Nilambur–Shoranur line is among the shortest as well as picturesque broad gauge railway lines in India. The railway line is surrounded by teak trees. It was laid by the British in colonial era for the transportation of Nilambur Teak logs into United Kingdom through Kozhikode.

=== Silent Valley National Park ===
Silent Valley National Park is located near Karuvarakundu in Nilambur Taluk. It is located in the rich biodiversity of Nilgiri Biosphere Reserve. Karimpuzha Wildlife Sanctuary, New Amarambalam Reserved Forest, and Nedumkayam Rainforest in Nilambur Taluk of Malappuram district, Attappadi Reserved Forest in Mannarkkad Taluk of Palakkad district, and Mukurthi National Park of Nilgiris district, are located around Silent Valley National Park. Mukurthi peak, the fifth-highest peak in South India, and Anginda peak are also located in its vicinity. Bhavani River, a tributary of Kaveri River, and Kunthipuzha River, a tributary of Bharathappuzha river, originate in the vicinity of Silent Valley. The Kadalundi River has also its origin in Silent Valley. The waterfalls like Keralamkundu are also located in Karuvarakundu.

=== Nadukani Churam ===
A Ghat road connects Nilambur with Gudalur and Ooty of the neighbouring Nilgiris district. It is located at Vazhikkadavu in the eastern end of Nilambur Taluk and Malappuram district.

=== Vavul Mala ===
Several waterfalls and hillstations are located in the Gram panchayats around Vavul Mala (Urangattiri, Edavanna etc.).

== Notable people ==
- P. V. Abdul Wahab, MP of Rajya Sabha
- Aryadan Muhammed, former minister of Kerala
- P V Anvar, ex MLA of Nilambur
- Aryadan Shoukath, film director
- Asif Saheer, footballer
- Gopinath Muthukad, Magician and motivational speaker
- Krishnachandran, Actor, playback singer and dubbing artist
- M. Swaraj, politician and Former MLA from Thrippunithura Constituency
- Nilambur Ayisha, actress
- Nilambur Balan, actor
- KM Asif, cricketer
- Rashin Rahman, actor
- Sankaran Embranthiri, musician
- Zeenath, actress

== See also ==
- Nilambur (State Assembly constituency)
- Nilambur-Shoranur railway line
- Nilambur railway station
- Nilambur–Nanjangud line
- Teak Museum
- Nilambur Kingdom
- List of villages in Malappuram district
- List of Gram Panchayats in Malappuram district
- List of desoms in Malappuram district (1981)
- Revenue Divisions of Kerala
