= Musliyar =

Musliyar is an honorific associated with South Indian, chiefly Malayali, scholars of Islam. Notable people with the surname include:

- Abbas Musliyar, the founder of Al Madeena Islamic complex, Mangalore
- Ali Musliyar (1861–1922), religious leader of the 1921–1922 Malabar rebellion
- E.K. Hasan Musliyar (1929–1982), Sunni religious scholar from the state of Kerala, India
- Anakkara Koyakutty Musliyar, Sunni religious scholar from the state of Kerala, India
- Cherussery Zainuddeen Musliyar, Indian Sunni Muslim religious scholar from the state of Kerala
- E. K. Aboobacker Musliyar, Sunni Muslim scholar and religious leader from Kerala, South India
- K. Ali Kutty Musliyar, Islamic scholar, writer, orator, thinker and spiritual leader from Kerala, South India
- Kalambadi Muhammad Musliyar (1934–2012), Sunni Muslim religious scholar from Kerala state, South India and former president of Samastha Kerala Jamiyyathul Ulama
- Kanniyath Ahmed Musliyar, former president of Samastha Kerala Jamiyyathul Ulama, was a 20th-century scholar of Muslim Kerala
- Sheikh Abubakr Ahmad Musliyar, Grand Mufti of India
- Kotta Abdul Khader Musliyar, Islamic scholar hailing from Mogral, Kasaragod, district of Indian state Kerala and an active member of Samastha Kerala Jamiyyathul Ulama
- Kutubi Muhammed Musliyar, scholar hailing from Kerala and advisor of Samastha Kerala Jamiyyathul Ulama
- Pangil Ahmed Kutty Musliyar, scholar hailing from Kerala, is the second president of Samastha Kerala Jamiyyathul Ulama
- Thirurangadi Bappu Musliyar, Muslim scholar, poet and of one of the traditionalist Sunni Muslims in Kerala, India
- TKM Bava Musliyar, Indian Muslim scholar and the former president of Samastha Kerala Islam Matha Vidyabyasa Board

== See also ==
- Muliyar
