= Azhari Thangal =

President of Samastha Kerala Jamiat-ul-Ulema

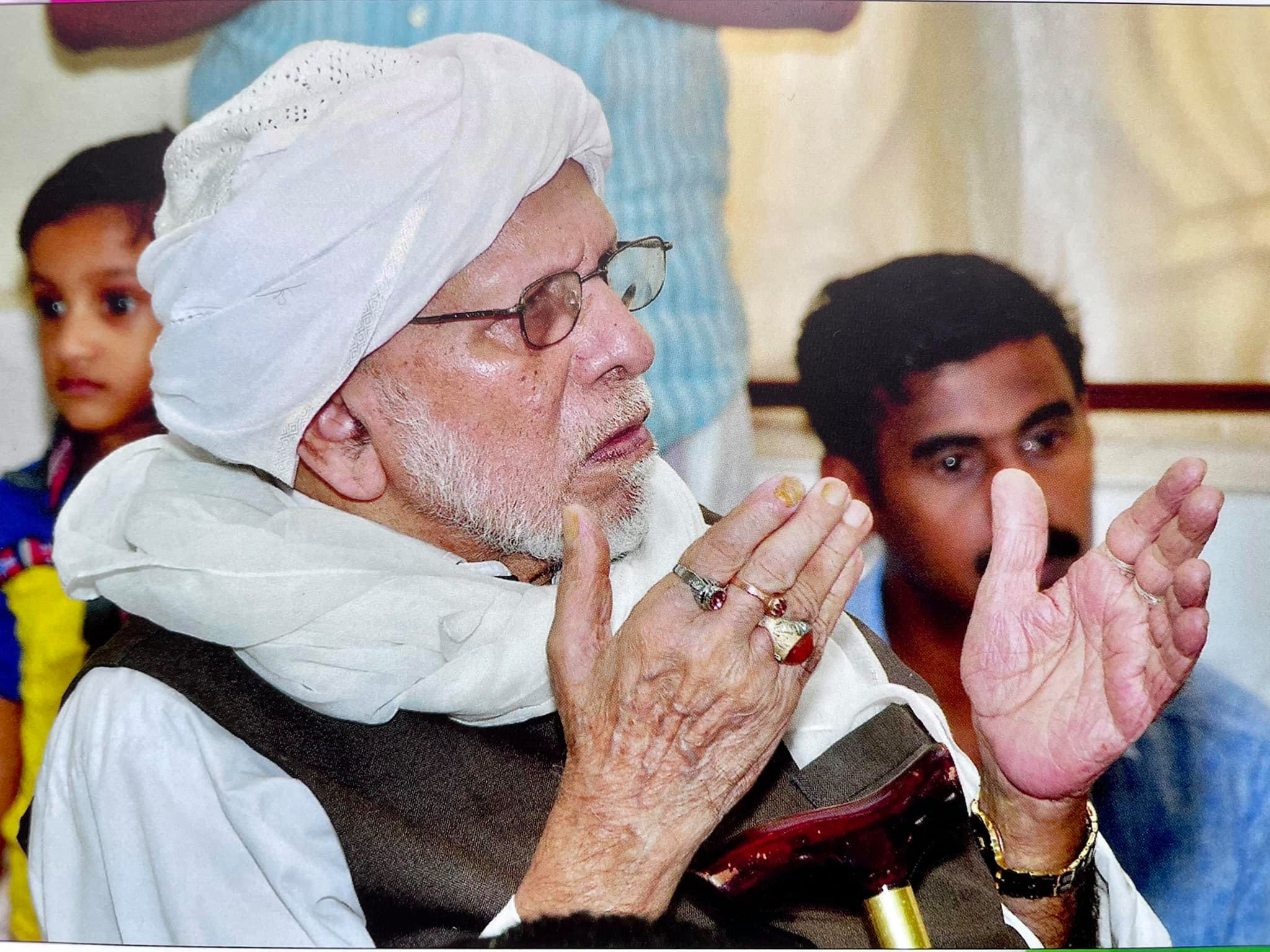
- Azhari Thangal at his grandson's Nikkah function at Valanchery on 22 Oct. 2012.

Former President of Samastha Kerala Jem-iyyathul Ulama
- In office 1995–2004
- Preceded by: K K Aboobacker Hazrath
- Succeeded by: Kalambadi Muhammad Musliyar

Former principal of Jami'a Nooriyya Arabic College

Former principal of Malik bin deenar Islamic Complex -Thrissur

Personal details
- Born: Sayyid Abdurahman al-Aydarus; 1922 Marathamcode, Kunnamkulam, Thrissur
- Died: 22 November 2015 (aged 93) ((10_Safar_1437)) Valanchery, Kerala, India
- Education: Graduation in Arabic and Islamic Sharia . Al-Qasimi, Al-Baqavi, Al-Azhari
- Alma mater: Al-Azhar University, Cairo, Egypt. Cairo University Darul Uloom Deoband, Saharanpur district, Uttar Pradesh. Baqiyat Salihat Arabic College, Vellore, Tamil Nadu.
- Occupation: Islamic scholar

Sayyid Abdurrahman al-Aydarus ( السيد عبد الرحمان العيدروس الأزهري تنكل), also known as Azhari Thangal (അസ്ഹരി തങ്ങള്‍) was the President of Samastha Kerala Jem-iyyathul Ulama, the largest Muslim organisation in Kerala, India. He was selected as the vice president of the organisation in 1993 and two years later appointed as its President following the death of K K Aboobacker Hazrath. He was nominated by Shams-ul-Ulama E. K. Aboobacker Musliyar.

== Early life and family ==
Azhari Thangal's father Sayyid Muhammed Thangal was one of the first scholars from the Thangal families of Kerala to get Al-Baqavi graduation from Baqiyat Salihat Arabic College. His family like many other Thangal families of Kerala are of Hadhrami Ba 'Alawi sada origin. His particular clan, the al-Aydarus are descended from the famed saint of Yemen, Sayyid Abu Bakr al-Aydarus. He is survived by eleven children and three wives.

== Education and career ==
He first learned religion from his father, studied in Dars at Orumanayur, Kallor, Njamanangad, Vailathur Masjids. He served as Mudaris (preacher teacher) at Thalakkadathur Juma Masjid. He completed degree Baqavi from Baqiyat Salihat Arabic College, Vellore, Tamil Nadu in 1951 and Qasimi from Darul Uloom Deoband, Uttar Pradesh in 1956. He left for Egypt for further studies and obtained his Al-Azhar degree from Al Azhar University. While pursuing post Graduation in Cairo University after completion of Librarian degree, he moved to Libya for joining as faculty in The Islamic University of Asaied Mohamed Bin Ali Al Sanussi. Later he moved to Saudi Arabia and served as professor for more than 20 years under Saudi Government and Riyadh University colleges at Khulays and Wadi Addawasir respectively.

== Writings ==
Azhari Thangal's books include:

- Al Arab Wal Arabiyya(Arabs And Arabic Language)(Arabic: العرب والعربية )

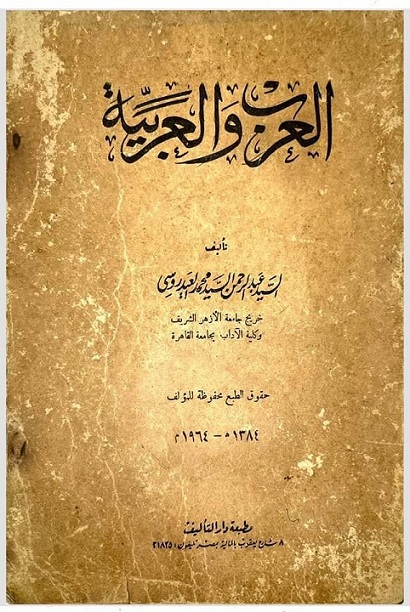
Al Arab Wal Arabiyya(Arabs And Arabic Language)(Arabic: العرب والعربية )

- Min Nawabigi Ulemai Malaibar (Arabic: من نوابغ علماء مليبار)
- Abu Nawas wa hayathuhu (Arabic: أبو نواس وحياته)
- Thariq nnahvi wa thathawwuruhu (Arabic: تاريخ النحو وتطوّره)
- Majmau thareeq Rasoolinalazhlam-Swallallahu alaihi wasallam (Arabic: مجمع تاريخ رسولنا الأعظم -صلى الله عليه وسلم)
- Athasawuful islami (Arabic: التصوف الإسلامي)
- Mojizu Thareekh Al Adabil Arabi Wadda’wath Al Islamiyya fee Malaibar (Arabic: موجز تاريخ الأدب العربي والدعوة الإسلامية في مليبار)
- Qissath Malik Malaibar lladi I’tahnaqa al Islam (Arabic: قصة ملك مليبار الذي اعتنق الإسلام)
- Thareeq Sheikh Malik bin deenar lladi nashara al Islam fee Malaibar (Arabic: تاريخ الشيخ مالك بن دينار الذي نشر الإسلام في مليبار)
- Athasawwufu Saheeh wal Musawwafa (Arabic: التصوف الصحيح والمتصوفة)
- Muqthasaru Hayathi Shamsul Ulema (Arabic: مختصر حياة شمس العلماء)
- Thareeq sayyid Alavi Mampuarmi (Arabic: تاريخ السيد علوي المنفرمي)
- Annashathu Deeni fil Hind (Arabic: النشاط الديني في الهند)
- Alfathahul mubeeni ala sharhi fathahul muheen (Arabic: الفتح المبين على شرح فتح المعين)

== Demise ==
Azhari Thangal died on 22 November 2015 at his residence in Valanchery. His Maqam (shrine) is located in Kolamangalam.

== Memorial ==
Azhari Thangal Qutub khana (Library) is opened by Sayed Hyderali Shihab Thangal, nearer to his Maqam (shrine).

Kerala University Department of Arabic Alumni Association (KUDAAA) starts to institute the annual Azhari Thangal Excellence Award, to honour the outstanding achievements in Contribution to promotion and growth of Arabic Language in Kerala from 2019.
