= Abdul Azeez Madani =

Indian Islamic scholar (1950–2022)

His Eminence Abdul Azeez Madani

Personal life
- Born: 9 April 1950 Thalassery, Kerala, India
- Died: 14 July 2022 (aged 72) Badriyya Manzil, Madavoor, Kozhikode, Kerala, India
- Resting place: Madani Ustad Maqam, Kunnamangalam, Kerala, India
- Era: Modern era
- Main interest: Writing
- Education: Sayyid Madani Arabic College

Religious life
- Religion: Sunni Islam
- Jurisprudence: Shafi'i
- Tariqa: Naqshbandi
- Movement: Muslim Jamaat
- Profession: Islamic scholar

Senior posting
- Teacher: Sayyid Abdurrahman Al Bukhari
- Influenced by: CM Waliyyullah

Abdul Azeez Madani (9 April 1950 – 14 July 2022) was an Indian Islamic scholar and writer from Kerala and one of the leaders of traditional Sunni Muslims in India. He died in Badriyya Manzil and was buried in Madani Ustad Maqam (Madani Dargah) at Kunnamangalam.

== Early life ==
Abdul was born to Umar Molla and Fatima in Thalassery, Kannur district, Kerala. He started his studies under his father. After the primary studies from home, he went to the Sayyid Madani Arabic College, Ullal, Karnataka. Following his graduation, Abdul returned to his native home and carried on in the educational field for years. He was the second rank holder in Madani graduation.

== Books ==
- Muslim names

== Awards ==
- Makhdoomi Award

== See also ==
- Sayyid Muhammad Jifri Muthukkoya Thangal
- Sheikh Abubakr Ahmad
- Sayyid Ibraheem Khaleel Al Bukhari
- Prof. Ali Kutty Musliyar
