= Sayyid Muhammad Al Jifri =

Indian Islamic scholar

Sayyidul Ulama Sheikh Muhammad Al-Jifri Thangals
- حبيب محمد بن حسين الجفري
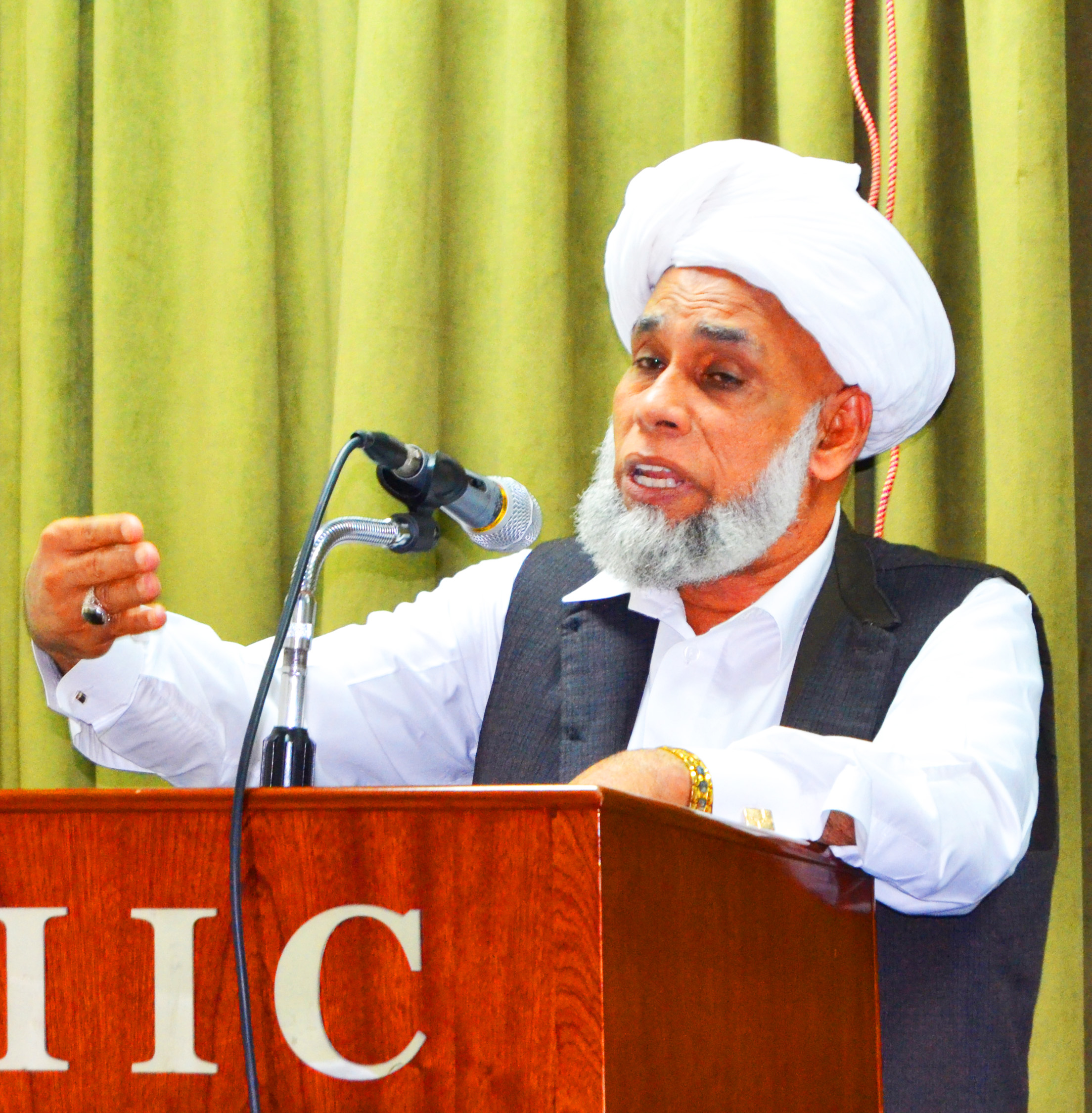
- Sayyid Muhammad Jifri Muthukokya Thangal in Abu Dhabi (2014).
- Born: Muhammad; 1957 (age 68–69); Cherumukku, Tirurangadi, Malappuram District
- Citizenship: Indian
- Education: Darul Uloom Nadwatul Ulama, Uttar Pradesh Jami'a Nooriyya Arabic College, Keralam
- Occupations: Islamic scholar, Religious leader Qadi Ulama
- Organization(s): President of Samastha Kerala Jem-iyyathul Ulama since Jan., 2017
- Known for: Islamic scholar in Shafi'i school, President of Samastha Kerala Jem-iyyathul Ulama
- Office: President; Samastha, Chairman; Suprabhaatham
- Predecessor: Kumaramputhur A. P. Muhammed Musliyar
- Movement: Ahlus Sunnah Wal Jamaah Sunni Islam Sufism
- Board member of: Chairman Suprabhaatham Chairman Samastha National Education Council
- Parents: Syed Hussain Jifri Pookunji Koya Thangal (father); Syedat Fatima Cheriya Beevi (mother)
- Family: Ahl al-Bayt, Jifri, Thangals
- Awards: Varakkal Mullakoya Thangal Memorial Scholarly Talent Award, Qazi Foundation Award, Ponmala Fareed Musliyar Memorial Award
- Website: https://samastha.info/team

Sheikh Habib Muhammad bin Husayn Al-Jifri, also known as Syed Jifri Muthukoya Thangal is the current President, Samastha and an Islamic scholar, teacher, religious leader and Qazi. He is an Islamic scholar from Kerala, India. He serves as President, Samastha Kerala Jem-iyyathul Ulama, the body of Sunni-Shafi'i scholars in Kerala, Tamilnadu, Karnataka and Lakshadweep. Thangal is the 11th president of the Samastha Kerala Jem-iyyathul Ulama.

== Personal life ==
Muhammad Al-Jifri was born in March 1957 at Matrbhavanam in Irumpuchola, Malappuram district as the son of Habib Husain Al-Jifri and Fathima Biwi Al-Jamalullaili. He is from the Jifry family, who are the descendants of Habib Husayn Al-Jifri, one of the descendants of Husayn bin Ali who arrived from Yemen in 1823.

== Education ==
Sayyid Muhammad Jifri Thangal’s primary education was at Ruhul Islam Madrasa in his native Cherumukku, AMLP School in Kundoor, and Government High School in Tirurangadi.

Jifri Thangal, who was passionate about religious studies, completed his dars (traditional Islamic studies) in Cherumukku, Tirurangadi, Thazhe Chinakkal, and Thekkumpadam.

His primary teachers were Abul Bushra Marhoom P. Kunjeen Musliyar, Tirurangadi Bapu Musliyar, Shamsul Ulama E. K. Aboobacker Musliyar, Kottumala Abubacker Musliyar, A. P. Muhammed Musliyar Kumaramputhur, Kottumala Moideen Kutty Musliyar, and M. T. Abdullah Musliyar.

After studying at Jamia Nooriya, Pattikkad, from 1974 to 1975, he joined Jalaliya College in Chennai in 1976. However, he had to interrupt his studies due to illness. Unable to continue there, he resumed studying in Tirurangadi for a short period.

In 1977, he joined Darul Uloom Nadwatul Ulama in Lucknow, where he earned a post-graduate degree in Islamic Sharia as a Nadwi graduate.

== Awards & Honors ==
- Varakkal Mullakoya Thangal Memorial Scholarly Talent Award
- Qazi Foundation Award
- Ponmala Fareed Musliyar Memorial Award
- Toofan Warriors badge by Keralam home ministry

== Positions Held ==
- President, Samastha Kerala Jam'iyathul Ulama
- President, Samastha kerala Jam-iyyathul Mudariseen
- Vice President, Samastha Kerala Islamic Education Board (SKIMVB)
- Chairman, Samastha National Education Council
- Chairman, Suprabhaatham Daily & Iqrau publications
- Qadi, Kanhangad Muslim Jamaat Council
- Qadi, Mangalore Muslim Jamaat Council
- Qadi, Ullal Muslim Jamaat Council
- Qadi, Kottikkulam Muslim Jamaat Council
- Qadi, Pallikkere Muslim Jamaat Council
- President, MIC Chattanchal
- Principal, Jamia Yamania Arabic College, Kuttikkattoor
- Principal, Ash'ariyya Arabic College, Madavoor
- Professor, Darul Huda Islamic University
- Former Principal, Darussalam Arabic College, Nandi

== Career ==
He succeeded Kumaramputhur A. P. Muhammed Musliyar as the president of the Samastha in 2016. He is the disciple of famous Islamic scholars like Shams-ul-Ulama E.K Aboobacker Musliyar, Tirurangadi Bappu Musliyar and P Kunjeen Musliyar. He was one of the famous students of EK Aboobacker Musliyar.
