= Samastha Kerala Jem-iyyathul Ulama (EK Sunnis) =

Sunni Islamic organisation in India

Samastha Kerala Jam-iyyathul Ulama
- Flag of EK Samastha
- Formation: 26 June 1926; 100 years ago (Note: Per EK Sunnis)
- Founder: Sayyid Abdul Rahman ba-Alavi Varakkal Mullakoya Thangal (Note: Per EK Sunnis)
- Type: Sunni-Shafi'i scholarly body
- Region served: India; Gulf Cooperation Council
- President: Sayyid ul Ulama Sayed Muhammad Jifri Muthukkoya Thangal
- Website: samastha.info

Samastha Kerala Jem-iyyathul Ulama of EK Sunnis also known as Samastha, and EK Samastha, is a Sunni-Shafi'i Muslim scholarly body in Kerala. The body administers Shafi'ite mosques, institutes of higher religious learning (the equivalent of north Indian madrasas) and madrasas (institutions where children receive basic Islamic education) in India.

== History ==
Kerala Muslims of the fundamentalist and puritanical views of Muhammad bin Abdul Wahhab (1703-1792), Salafism of Rashid Rida (1865-1935), Islamic modernism of Muhammad Abduh (1819-1905), pan-Islamism of Jamaluddin Afghani (1939-1897), and the Tahreek e-Mujahideen in North India. The new ideologists first came out through the Kerala Muslim Aikya Sangham (group for unity among Kerala Muslims), which was founded at Kodungallur of Cochin State in 1922 by leaders like K. M. Seethi Sahib, K. M. Maulavi, and EK Moulavi.

It tried to bring the scattered and unorganised reformist activists together. Later, they formed an Ulama organisation, Kerala Jem-iyyathul Ulama, at a two-day conference of Aikya Sangham held at Aluva in 1924.

=== Formation ===
Samastha Kerala Jamiyyathul Ulama was formed on June 26, 1926 but it was officially registered on November 14, 1934, as the government approved its bylaw, which was agreed upon after deep and wide scholarly discussions held in various Mushawara meets and in consultation with law experts. It promulgated the propagation of true Islam, impart of religious education and activities against superstitions and un-Islamic traditions as its primary and supreme objectives. Its bylaw also included encouragement for secular education compatible with religious beliefs, and calls for religious tolerance, interfaith friendship, peaceful existence and national progress. The registration Number is S1.1934/35 at office of the Kozhikode district registrar

=== Samastha history 1924-2000s ===
The Samastha Kerala Jem-iyyathul Ulama felt the need to organise to defend and protect Kerala’s Islamic tradition and to wage a revivalist movement against the new interpretations. Pangil Ahmed Kutty Musliyar, who had already started counter campaigns against the ‘Wahhabi ideology’, along with some other scholars, met Varakkal Mullakoya Thangal, who was a Sufi Sheikh, to discuss creating an organisational movement to defend theirb version of Islam. Tangal suggested convening a meeting of scholars to discuss the suitable solution. In 1925, some major ulama and other society leaders gathered at Calicut Valiya Juma Masjid and formed an ulama organisation after prolonged and serious discussions.

KP Muhammad Meeran Musliyar and Parol Hussain Moulawi were named the President and Secretary of the organisation, respectively.

Event date	Event notes	Place	leadership presence
1926 June 26	'Samastha' Founding Conference	Town Hall, Kozhikode	Sayyid Hashim Cherukunhikkoya Thangal
1927 February 7	'Samastha' First Conference	Tanur	Liyauddeen Hazrath (Nalir Bakhiyaath)
1927 December 31	'Samastha' Second Conference	Molur.	Pangil Ahmed Kutty Musliyar
1929 January 7	Samastha' Third Conference	Chemmankuzhy (Vallappuzha)	Moulana Muhammad Abdul Bari
1929 January 7	Samastha' Mushavara decided to publish a daily	Chemmankuzhy (Vallappuzha).	Moulana Muhammad Abdul Bari
1929 December 10	Samastha' Published a first daily in the name of 'Al Bayaan'.		K V Muhammad Musliyar(Editor & Publisher)
1930 March 17	Samastha' 4th Conference	Mannarkkad	Vellengara Muhammad Musliyar
1931 March 11	Samastha' 5th Conference	Velliyancheri	Karimbanakkal Ahmad Musliyar.
1932 June	Pangil Ahmad Kutty Musliyar appointed as President of 'Samastha		
1933	Samastha' 6th Conference	Feroke.	Shihabuddeen Ahmed Koya.
1934 November 14	Bailo of 'Samastha' Registered	Kozhikkode District Registrar Office.	
1945 May 27,28	Samastha' 16th Conference	Karyavattam	
1945 August 1	'Samastha' decided to publish a publication under 'Samastha'		
1947 March 15,16,17	'Samastha' 17th Conference	Meenchantha (Kozhikkode)	
1949 March 30	Pathi Abdul Khadir Musliyar reached	Malabar	
1949 September 1	'Samastha' Mushavara decided to establish Madrasa in each Mahallu	Sayyid Abdurahman Bafakhy Thangal.	
1949 October 16	'Samastha' appointed to establish first Madrasa and Dars 2 Organizers	Vallappuzha	K P Usman Sahib, N K Ayamu Musliyar Vallappuzha.
1950 April 29,30	'Samastha' 18th Conference	Valancheri	DNA
1950 April 30	Samastha' appointed K P Usman Sahib as 'Samastha' Office Secretary	Samastha' Office	
1950 October	Al Bayaan' started republishing	Valakkulam	*Kaderi Muhammad Musliyar: Publisher: K P Usman Sahib.
1951 March 23,24,25	'Samastha' 19th Conference	Vatakara.	Moulana Muhammad Habeebulla.
1951 March 24	Paravanna Muhyuddeen Kutty Musliyar appointed as 'Samastha' Secretary		
1951 September 17	'Samastha' Prathinidhi Conference	Valakkulam	
1951 September 17	SKIMVB formed		
1951 September 17	Madrasa Syllabus Committee formed		Members: Moulana Paravanna Muhyuddeen Kutty Musliyar, K V Muthukoya Thangal, K M Kunhimoosa Musliyar, O Abdurahman Musliyar, P Aboobakkar Nizami.
1951 October 28	SKIMVB meeting approved Madrasa Syllabus to Std. 1 to 5		
1951 October 28	SKIMVB meeting approved Bylaw of SKIMVB		
1951 October 28	SKIMVB meeting decided to register Madrasas		
1951 October 28	SKIMVB meeting formed Text Book Committee to make text book		

=== Conferences ===
Samastha organised a host of public conferences at various places to spread their message. Facing an opposition of secularly educated people, journalists, advocates and neo-scholars who had been fruitfully utilising all means from public meetings to publications to propagate their reformist ideologies and to brand traditionalists as courting shirk, Samastha leaders were compelled to come out to defend themselves against the allegations and to explain its views. Systematically held public conferences and anniversaries increased Samasthas popularity, kept the majority of Mappila Muslims in their fold, and restricted the inroads of reformist ideologies. In the first 25 years, Samastha focused its agenda on conducting public conferences, dialogues and ideological conflicts. Between 1927 and 1944, it convened 15 annual conferences at various places attracting immense public attention. 70th year Anniversary E.K Aboobacker musliar addressing the crowd The 16th conference held at Karyavattam was important as since then Samastha started to keep records and registers of all activities, resolutions and decisions scientifically. After that, the frequency of the huge public conferences decreased mainly because the organisation had tightened its foundation and fortress by 1950s and it had formed many sub committees and subordinate organisations to deal with different issues. In next 40 years, it conducted next eight conferences.

- 1985–1996

The 24th and 25th conferences held at Calicut seashore in 1985 and 1996 were the largest gatherings the town had ever witnessed, for the resolutions, topics and issues the conference sessions discussed, and for the attention both drew from non-Muslim, political and government circles.

- 2002 – Samastha celebrated its platinum jubilee holding public conferences at five major Kerala cities: Kasargod, Calicut, Thrissur, Kollam and Tiruvanandapuram.
- 26 February 2012 – The Samastha 85th conferences held at Kooriyad, Malappuram
- 11 February 2016 – The Samastha 90th conferences held at Alappuzha

== Mushawara council ==
A forty-member 'mushawara' is the high command body of the Sunni council. As of 2020, the president was Sayed Jifri Muthukkoya Thangal.

== Structure ==
- President — Sayed Jifri Muthukkoya Thangal
- General Secretary — P. P. Umer Musliyar
- Treasurer — M.T. Abdulla Musliyar

== Presidents ==
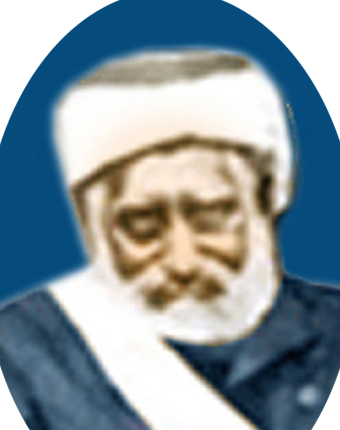
Varakkal Mullokoya Thangal, founding president of Samastha

- Varakkal Mullokoya Thangal (1926–1932)
- Pangil Ahmed Kutty Musliyar (1932–1945)
- Abdul Bari Musliyar (1945–1965)
- KK Sadakkathulla Musliyar (1965–1967)
- Kanniyath Ahmed Musliyar (1967–1993)
- K.K. Aboobacker Hazrath (1993–1995)
- Sayyid Abdurahman Imbichikoya Thangal Al-Aydarusi Al-Azhari (1995–2004)
- Kalambadi Mohammed Musliar (2004–2012)
- C Koya Kutty Musliyar (2012–2016)
- Kumaramputhur A. P. Muhammed Musliyar (2016–2017)
- Sayed Jifri Muthukkoya Thangal (2017–Present)

== Sub-organizations in EK Sunnis' viewpoint ==
The EK Samastha's Samastha Centenary Memmorial Book mentions several of its sub-organisations and gives details of them. They are as follows:

- Samastha Kerala Islam Matha Vidyabhyasa Board (SKIMVB)

It is a sub-body of Samastha. It was founded on 24 March 1951. The board prepares curriculum, syllabus and textbooks in over 11,000 madrasas.

- Samastha Kerala Jam-iyyathul Mufathisheen (SKJM)

It is an organisation of madrasa inspectors. Its state-level body was formed in 1959.

- Sunni Mahallu Federation (SMF)

It is an organization to coordinate and empower mallahu bodies. First body of SMF was formed in 1976 in the northern part of Tirur Taluk, then in 1977 in Malappuram district. In 1987 the state-level body was formed.

- Samastha Kerala Sunni Students Federation (SKSSF)

It is a student-youth organisation of Samastha. It was founded on 19 February 1989.

- Sunni Yuvajana Sangham (SYS)

It a youth and mass organisation of EK Samastha. It was regrouped due to a reason linked to the 1989 dispute between AP Sunnis and EK Sunnis. AP Sunnis had taken over the SYS founded in 1954.

- Samastha Kerala Sunni Bala Vedi (SKSBV)

It was founded on 26 December 1993. It functions under the aegis of SKJMCC, inside and outside of Kerala, with 19 district committees, 560 range committees and ten thousand madrasasa unit committees, with around 12 lakh members.

- Samastha Employees Association (SEA)

It is an organisation of employees. It was founded in 2001.

- Samastha Kerala Madrasa Management Association (SKMMA)

It is an organisation of madrasa office bearers. It began its works since 2009 under SKIVB.

- Samastha Kerala Jamiyyathul Muallimeen Central Council (SKJMCC)

It is an association for madrasa teachers. Its first district level working body was formed in 2013 and the state level body in 2015

- Samastha Kerala Jam-iyyathul Mudariseen (SKJM)

It first district level working committee came in to being in June 2013 and the state level committee after EK Samastha central mushavara's permission in 2015.

- Samastha Legal Cell (SLC)

It was founded in 2013 under SKIVB. EK Samastha's Samastha Centenary Memmorial Book, published on 4 February 2025, says as of now Samastha has filed several appeals before the Supreme Count of India for around 22 matters

- Samastha Kerala Jam-iyyathul Quthabah (SKJQ)

It is a body of Khatibs. It was founded on 15 April 2017.

- Samastha Pravasi Cell (SPC)

It was founded in 2019. EK Samastha's Samastha Centenary Memmorial Book, published on 4 February 2025, referring to it as the "newest child" of Samastha, continues that Samastha recognised it as the 14th feeder organisation.

== Institutions ==
- Jami'a Nooriyya Arabic College
- Jamia Jalaliyya Mundakkulam
- Jamia Darussalam Al Islamiyya Nandi
- Darul Huda Islamic University
- Samastha National Education Council (SNEC)
- Alathurpadi Dars
- Muttichira Dars
- Kodangad Dars
- MEA Engineering College
- Akode islamic dawa academy

== 100th anniversary ==
The 100th Anniversary of Samastha Kerala refers to the events organized in 2024 to commemorate the centennial of the Samastha Kerala Jem-iyyathul Ulama, The two-year-long celebrations were inaugurated on 28 January 2024 in Bangalore, Karnataka, India and will continue till 8 February 2026. Karnataka Chief Minister Siddaramaiah inaugurated the Samastha's 100th anniversary declaration conference at Bengaluru Palace grounds 28 January 2024.

=== Official celebrations ===
- January 2024 - Commencement of the 100th anniversary celebration Inauguration at Bengaluru

Celebrations of the 100th anniversary of Samastha Kerala Jem-iyyathul Ulama, which will be held from February 6 to 8, 2026, have begun in Bengaluru. Chief Minister Siddaramaiah inaugurated the 100th anniversary function at Bengaluru Palace grounds on 28 January 2024.

=== Action Plans ===
Six action plans were announced at the inaugural meeting. Samasta President Muhammad Jifri Muthukkoya Thangal announced the plans. They announced the six projects decided in the Samasta Kendra Mushavara meeting.

- Formulating and implementing new projects at the national and international level to spread the ideals of the Holy Ahlus Sunnah Wal Jamaah
- Formation of coordination committee at international level to coordinate activities of Samasta at national and international levels.
- Starting a Higher education institution in Bengaluru.
- Formulation of necessary plans to extend the existing educational systems of Samasta to more areas.
- Designing and implementing projects with more emphasis on socio-cultural philanthropic activities.
- Introduction of new systems in the field of instruction subject to the ideals of Ahlus Sunnati Wal Jamaat
