= M. Abdurahman Salafi =

Personal details
- Born: 30 May 1959 (age 67) Mangada, Malappuram District, Kerala, India
- Education: Sullamussalam Arabic College

M. Abdurahman Salafi is an Islamic scholar, and Arabic professor. He served as one of the secretaries of the Kerala Nadvathul Mujahideen state committee, managing trustee of Kerala Nadvathul Mujahideen and syndicate member of Calicut University.
