= Arabic College =

Islamic institute in southern India

Arabic Colleges in southern India refer to the educational institutes of higher Islamic learning. They are sometimes also known as Oriental Title Colleges in Kerala, and they are the near equivalent of north Indian madrasas. Graduates from Arabic Colleges can sit privately for the state recognized "Afzal-ul-Ulama" credential, which qualifies them to serve as Arabic Language teachers in state educational institutions.

A madrasa in Kerala is an extra-curricular institution where children receive basic Islamic education.

There are mainly two types of Arabic Colleges in Kerala—the 'traditionalist' Shafi'ite Arabic Colleges and the Salafi Movement-inspired Colleges. Most of the colleges come under the first category.

Arabic Colleges (based on funding and affiliation)

- Government Grant Aided & State University Affiliated Arabic Colleges (Oriental Title Colleges)
- Unaided & State University Affiliated Arabic Colleges
- Unaided & Non-affiliated Arabic Colleges

== Programmes offered ==
Source: Government of Kerala University of Calicut

In Government Grant Aided Arabic Colleges affiliated to State Universities

=== Higher Secondary level ===
- Afzal-ul-Ulama Preliminary

=== Undergraduate Degree level (Bachelor of Arts or Commerce) ===
- Afzal-ul-Ulama
- Functional Arabic .
- Economics with Islamic Finance
- English with Islamic History
- Islamic Finance

=== Post Graduate level (Master of Arts) ===
- Post Afzal-ul-Ulama
- Islamic Finance
- Arabic

== Government Aided Arabic Colleges (Oriental Title Colleges) ==
Source: Government of Kerala University of Calicut

Government Aided Arabic College	State University	Programmes offered
Rouzathul Uloom Arabic College, Farook College, Kozhikode	Calicut University	Afzal-ul-Ulama Preliminary (2 years); BA Afzal-ul-Ulama (3 years); BA Functional Arabic .; MA Post Afzal-ul-Ulama (2 years); BCom Islamic Finance
Darunnajath Arabic College, Karuvarakundu, Malappuram	Calicut University	Afzal-ul-Ulama Preliminary; BA Afzal-ul-Ulama; BCom with Islamic Finance; MA Arabic
Sunniya Arabic College, Chennamangallur, Mukkom, Kozhikode	Calicut University	Afzal-ul-Ulama; MA Post Afzal-ul-Ulama; BCom Islamic Finance
Ansar Arabic College, Valavannur, Malappuram	Calicut University	Afzal-ul-Ulama Preliminary; BA Afzal-ul-Ulama; Post Afzal-ul-Ulama; MA Post Afzal-ul-Ulama; BCom with Islamic Finance
Anvarul Islam Arabic College, Kuniyil, Malappuram	Calicut University	Afzal-ul-Ulama Preliminary; BA Afzal-ul-Ulama; BCom with Islamic Finance; MA Arabic
Madeenathul Uloom Arabic College, Pulikal, Malappuram	Calicut University	Afzal-ul-Ulama Preliminary; BA Afzal-ul-Ulama; Post Afzal-ul-Ulama; BA Economics with Islamic Finance; BA Functional Arabic
Sullamussalam Arabic College, Areacode, Malappuram	Calicut University	Afzal-ul-Ulama Preliminary; BA Afzal-ul-Ulama; Post Afzal-ul-Ulama; BA Economics with Islamic Finance; BA English with Islamic History
Darul Uloom Arabic College, Vazhakad, Malappuram	Calicut University	Afzal-ul-Ulama Preliminary; BA Afzal-ul-Ulama; Post Afzal-ul-Ulama; BA Functional Arabic (aided); MA Islamic Finance
Nasarthal Islam Arabic College, Kadavathur, Kannur	Kannur University	
Darul Irshad Arabic College, Paral, Kannur	Kannur University	
Anvarul Islam Women's Arabic College, Mongam, Malappuram	Calicut University	Afzal-ul-Ulama Preliminary; BA Afzal-ul-Ulama; Post Afzal-ul-Ulama; BA Economics with Islamic Finance; BA Functional Arabic

== Unaided and Non-affiliated Arabic Colleges ==
Source: University of Kerala (doctoral thesis, 2011)

- Al Jamia, Santhapuram, Malappuram
- Markazu Al Saqafathu Sunniyya, Karanthur, Kozhikode
- Darul Huda Islamic University, Chemmad, Malappuram
- Jamia Nooriyya Arabiyya, Pattikkad, Malappuram
- Jamia Nadviyya, Edavananna, Malappuram
- Ilahiyya College, Thirurkad, Malappuram
- Islahiya College, Chennamangaloor, Kozhikkode
- Jamia Salafiyya, Pulikkal, Malppuram
- Islamiyya College, Vadanappally, Trichur
