= Suprabhaatham =

Malayalam newspaper

- Type: Daily newspaper
- Format: Broadsheet
- Owner: Kozhikode Iqrau Publications Ltd.
- Founder: Kottumala Bappu Musliyar
- Publisher: Bahauddeen Muhammed Nadwi
- President: Sayyid Muhammad Jifri Muthukkoya Thangal
- Editor-in-chief: Bahauddeen Muhammed Nadwi
- Managing editor: T.P. Cheroopa
- Founded: 2014
- Language: Malayalam
- Headquarters: Kozhikode
- Website: www.suprabhaatham.com
- Free online archives: suprabhaatham.com/epaper/

Suprabhaatham (സുപ്രഭാതം) is a Malayalam daily newspaper owned and published by Kozhikode Iqrau Publications from Kozhikode on behalf of the Samastha Kerala Jamiyyathul Ulama, a Sunni organisation based in Kerala. The daily publishing from Kerala, India. It is the first Malayalam daily to be published with six editions. The word " Suprabhaatham" translates to literally "auspicious dawn". It is among the most read leading newspapers in Kerala. The newspaper has various editions from Kozhikode, Malappuram, Kannur, Thrissur, Kochi, Thiruvananthapuram and Palakkad in Kerala. It is headquartered at Francis Road, Kozhikode, Kerala

== History ==
Kozhikode Iqrau Publication launched the daily on 1 September 2014 in a function attended by Oommen Chandy, the then Chief Minister of Kerala. It is the first Malayalam daily to be published with six editions. Suprabhaatham has 7 print editions published from Kozhikode, Kochi, Malappuram, Kannur, Thrissur, palakkad and Thiruvananthapuram, . The daily has readership across Kerala as well as among the ethnic Malayali population of Lakshadweep, Dakshina Kannada, Kodagu and Nilgiri. It is the first Malayalam news which has got an initial circulation of more than three lakhs. Late Kottumala Bappu Musliyar was the founding chairman.

== Organisation ==
Bahauddeen Muhammed Nadwi is the Editor. T. P. Cheroopa is the Managing Editor. Sayyid Muhammad Jifri Muthukkoya Thangal is the chairman of the management while Bahauddeen Muhammed Nadwi, Abdul Hameed Faizee are the directors & CEO. Musthafa Mundupara and director Maniyoor Ahmad Musliyar is the chief patron of Suprabhaatham.
