= Melmuri =

Melmuri melmuri Junction, Melmuri, Malappuram
- Nicknames: Melmuri, melmuri Junction
- Location in Malappuram, India
- Coordinates: 11°10′50″N 76°1′0″E
- Country: India
- State: Kerala
- District: Malappuram

Population (2011)
  - Total: 22,217

Languages
  - Official: Malayalam, English
- Time zone: UTC+5:30 (IST)
- PIN: 676517
- Vehicle registration: KL- 10

Melmuri or Melmuri Junction is a town in Malappuram city in the state of Kerala, India. It's located on NH 966 towards Calicut Road. Today it is one of the residential as well as education zone of the city.

== Demographics ==
As of the 2011 India census, Melmuri had a population of 22,217, of which 10,637 were males and 11,580 females.

== Notable landmarks ==
- Alathurpadi Dars
- Konompara
- Juma masjid
- Grand Masjid
- PMR Auditorium
- PM Arcade
- Malappuram service cooperative bank melmuri
- Melmuri 27
- M.M.E.T Higher Secondary School
- M.C.T law &Training College
