= Anakkara Koyakutty Musliyar =

Indian religious scholar

President of Samastha (EK faction)
- In office 2012–2016
- Preceded by: Kalambadi Muhammad Musliyar

Personal details
- Born: 1934
- Died: 3 May 2016 (aged 81–82)
- Resting place: Anakkara
- Spouse: K. K. Fatima
- Parents: Hasainar Cholayil (father); Kunnathethil Ayishath Fatima (mother)
- Education: Baqiyat Salihat Arabic College
- Known for: Muslim leader

Anakkara C. Koyakutty Musliyar was an Islamic scholar of Sunni from the state of Kerala, India. He was the 9th president of the EK faction of Samastha (30 October 2012 – 3 May 2016). He was elected after the death of former president Kalambadi Muhammad Musliyar in October 2012. Musliyar died on 3 May 2016.
