= Kerala Nadvathul Mujahideen =

Kerala based salafi organisation

- Abbreviation: KNM
- Formation: 1950
- Type: Religious based organization
- Headquarters: C D Tower, Calicut
- Location: Kerala
- Region served: India
- Official language: Malayalam
- Parent organization: Kerala Jamiyyathul Ulama
- Affiliations: Mujahid Movement Salafiyya Movement All-India Jamaat-e- Ahl-i Hadith
- Website: knm.org.in

Kerala Nadvathul Mujahideen (KNM) is an Islamic organization in the state of Kerala founded in 1950. The organization is part of the Islamic reformist Mujahid Movement and follows the principles of Salafism. The Kerala Nadvathul Mujahideen was formed as a result of renaissance activities among Keralite Muslims led by scholars and clerics such as Sheikh Hamadani Thangal, K.M. Moulavi, Vakkom Moulavi, E. Moidu Moulavi and Ummer Moulavi. Kerala Nadvathul Mujahideen is considered as the successor of Kerala Muslim Aikya Sangam, the first Muslim organization in the state of Kerala, founded in 1924. The Mujahid movement laid the foundations of Islamic renaissance in Kerala by campaigning against corrupted practices of the Sufi orders, superstitions, false beliefs, polytheism etc., and called for the revival of true Islamic practices to the Muslim community in Kerala which had until then been severely lacking in crucial aspects of religious and socio-civic knowledge. The Mujahids consider themselves as proponents of authentic Islamic reform, pursuing a purified concept of Tawhid.

The social, cultural, educational, and religious activities of Kerala Nadvathul Mujahideen enhanced the Islamic renaissance, and enabled the state's Muslims to create their own characteristics and peculiarities that distinguished them from other Muslim communities in India by achieving high rates of literacy and a prestigious status in Kerala society. The Mujahid movement continues the Islamic reform traditions of the scholars Taqi al-Din ibn Taymiyya (1263-1328 C.E/661-728 A.H), Ahmad Sirhindi (1564-1624 C.E/ 971-1034 A.H), Shah Waliullah ad-Dehlawi (1703-1762 C.E/ 1114-1176 A.H), Muhammad ibn 'Abd al-Wahhab (1703-1792 C.E/ 1115-1207 A.H) and Muhammad Rashid Rida (1865-1935 C.E/ 1281 A.H-1353 A.H).

The theological reformation initiated by Vakkom Abdul Qadir Moulavi and his disciples was a conservative reform movement directly influenced by the Arab Salafiyya scholarly circles and trends popular in Syria, Egypt, etc. Although the Mujahids often visited the scholars of Saudi Arabia, the movement differed from both the militant Puritanism of the Arabian Wahhabi reformation as well as the "Neo-Mu'tazilism" of the culture-oriented North Indian Muslim modernists like Sir Sayyid Ahmad Khan. Instead, it was closer in spirit to the Arab Salafiyya movement, advancing a Keralite adaptation of reformist doctrines that focused on awakening Pan-Islamic consciousness; which became a major reason for its popularity.

== History ==
The consensus among historians is that Islam arrived in Kerala through Arab traders either during the time of Muhammed himself (AD 609 - AD 632) or in the following few decades. Kerala has an ancient relation with the Middle East even during the Pre-Islamic period. Muslim merchants (Malik, son of Dinar) settled in Kerala by the 8th century AD and introduced Islam. For a long time they kept the Islamic beliefs based on the message of Quran and the teachings of Muhammed. Later the Muslim community divided into different groups because of religious and political reasons. By the 16th century AD, with the arrival of colonization led by the Portuguese and the colonial modernity they gradually declined to a culturally, economically, and educationally deprived condition.

=== Kerala Muslim Aikhya Sangam ===
The history of Kerala Mappila renaissance began in the 19th century AD with Sayyid Sanaulla Makti Thangal. He encouraged Muslims to settle their differences by returning to the message of the Quran and the teachings of Muhammed. Sayyid Sanaulla Makti Thangal died in 1912, but he inspired scholars such as Sheikh Hamadani Thangal, K.M. Moulavi and Vakkom Moulavi. Apart from Sayyīd Sānāullah, the works of other scholars such as Chalilakath Kunjahamed Hajji (d. 1920), Shaikh Muhammad Hamādāni Thăngâl (d. 1922) provided the impetus for theological reformation amongst the Mappila Muslim Ulema. They formed the first Muslim movement in Kerala, known as the Kerala Muslim Aikhya Sangam, in Kodungallur in 1922, founded by the freedom fighter and Islamic scholar Vakkom 'Abdul Qadir Moulavi (d. 1873 - 1932 C.E). Beginning his career as an orthodox Maulavi, 'Abdul Qadir would become most influential social, theological and educational reformer of the Mujahids.

With the help of a Malabari Mappila, Vakkom Moulavi was introduced to the popular Pan-Islamic journal Al-Manar, published by the influential Salafi scholar Mùhāmmád Ráshīd Rîdâ (1865 - 1935 C.E) from Cairo. Vakkom Moulavi would be its ardent reader, and through Al-Manar, Moulavi became familiar with a wide range of contemporary Islamic reform movements and would be influenced by the doctrines of the 14th century Sunni theologian Taqi al-Din Ibn Taymiyya (d. 1328 C.E / 728 A.H). Impressed by these reformers' staunch commitment to Tawhid, Moulavi began vigorously campaigning against shirk and bidʿah (innovations); and proclaimed the centrality of upholding Tawhid. Advocating the teachings of Rashid Rida and Ibn Taymiyya, Vakkom Moulavi attacked Madhab partisanship, condemned Taqlid, calling upon Muslims to shun un-Islamic customs by directly returning to Qur'an and Hadith; and establish Islamic Unity. Modelled after Al-Manar, Moulavi would publish numerous journals and magazines with the purpose of spreading Islamic message, in a way that would directly reach the common masses, through three languages Malayalam, Arabic and Arabi-Malayalam. Proclaiming the reformers' gratitude to Rashid Rida, Vakkom Moulavi wrote:

"It is through Rashid Rida's Al-Manar that Kerala Muslims were awakened"

Vakkom Moulavi's teachings would be popularised across Malabar by his disciples like Khatib Muhammad Moulavi (1886 - 1964 C.E). Like his teacher, K.M Moulavi was a regular reader of Al-Manar journal and a well-read expert of Fiqh (Islamic jurisprudence) and Islamic theology. K.M Moulavi was a fierce opponent of the British administration and played a major role in the Mappila rebellion of 1921, which sought to topple British colonial rule in Malabar. After the uprising was put down, K.M Moulavi fled to Kodungalur, a Muslim region free from British influences. From Kondungalur, Moulavi became known as a reputed scholar and advocated reformist campaigns calling for the eradication of shirk and bidʿah. He was also a founding leader of Kerala Muslim Aikya Sangham in 1921. K.M Moulavi played an important role in the proliferation of various Islamic publications like Al-Irshad, Al-Islah, Al-Murshid, etc and was a regular contributor in Rashid Rida's Al-Manar. At popular request, the British authorities would withdraw all Mappila Rebellion charges in 1932 and the Moulavi would return home. In 1932, K.M Moulavi held a meeting of major Moulavis from all parts of Kerala and announced the establishment of "Kerala Jam'iyyat al-Ulema". Thereafter, Moulavi would become the most influential Islamic scholar of the Mappila Muslims of Malabar. His fatwas were widely requested all across Kerala due to his immense knowledge of Qur'an and Hadith; as well as his juristic mastery of Shafi'i and Hanafi madh'habs (legal schools). By force of his charismatic personality and widely accepted scholarly credentials, Moulavi was able to overcome newly developed opposition to the Islahi movement.

The movement encouraged Muslims to settle their differences by returning to the message of the Quran and the teachings of Muhammed. This message attracted educated people, and the group slowly gained the confidence of the Muslims of Kerala. The efforts of Aikhya Sangam promoted the formation of several formal and informal associations in other areas of Kerala. The Muslim Nishpaksha Sangam and Islam Dharma Sangam were important among them. The common goal of all these organizations was to promote the unity of Muslims based on the message of Quran and the teachings of Muhammed. The annual meetings of Kerala Muslim Aikhya Sangam gained attention by the participation of international Islamic scholars such as Marmaduke Pickthall.

=== Kerala Jamiyyathul Ulama ===
Many Muslim scholars in different areas of Kerala attracted by the message of "Kerala Muslim Aikhya Sangam" but they could not interact due to the lack of a common forum. Therefore, the leaders of "Kerala Muslim Aikhya Sangam" decided to create a forum of Muslim scholars for discussing religious matters. It resulted in the formation of the First Forum of Muslim Scholars Of Kerala at the Annual General Meeting of Kerala Muslim Aikhya Sangam in 1924 at Aluva. This scholars' forum is referred to as "Kerala Jamiyyathul Ulama Ahlussunna wal Jamaath", also known as Kerala Jamiyyathul Ulama (KJU). It acted as the advisory body of the Aikhya Sangam until the latter dissolved in 1934, but is still an active body in providing religious leadership to Kerala Nadvathul Mujahideen.

=== Formation of Kerala Nadvathul Mujahideen ===
The KJU decided to propagate the Islamic ideologies with the participation of people of all intellectual levels under its guidance. So, on 12 April 1947, in a working committee meeting of KJU, they decided to form a public organization. Kerala Nadvathul Mujahideen officially formed on 20 April 1950 in a meeting held at the office off "Al Manar" Magazine at Calicut. The organization registered in 1957 under the Society Act.

== Splits in the KNM ==
KNM had been split into two groups from 2002. Both the groups completed discussions at all levels in their respective feeder organizations and a joint sitting was held on 20 December. This division in KNM happened in 2002 when a faction led by Hussain Madavoor split from the parent organization over a number of ideological and organizational issues. In 2012, another organization came into existence from the KNM on the issues related to genie and sorcery, known as Wisdom Global Islamic Mission. The two major groups decided to merge into one platform in 2016. This was announced on 20 December 2016 in front of a huge audience at Calicut. However, soon after in 2018, another split occurred on the same ideological and organizational issues and currently they both are known as KNM (Official) and KNM (Markazudda'wa) respectively. The youth and student wings of both organizations work under the same names such as ISM and MSM respectively. KNM Markazudda'wa recently formed IGM for women parallel to MGM of KNM (Official).

== Organization ==
KNM have a number of feeder organizations under the religious leadership of Kerala Jamiyyathul Ulama (KJU) to achieve its objectives at all levels of society.

=== Ithihadu Shubbanil Mujahideen ===
The youth wing is referred to as Ithihadu Shubbanil Mujahideen (ISM). It was organized in 1967, and its main objective is to teach youth about the messages of the Quran and of Muhammed. Since its formation, it conducts youth oriented campaigns, seminars and symposiums on social issues. In December 2006 ISM conducted an international exhibition on Islam named "Salvation" at Calicut, which gained international attention and helped clear misconceptions about Islam. Its second and third editions were conducted at Eranakulam and Dubai.

=== Mujahid Students Movement ===
The student wing is known as Mujahid Students Movement (MSM). It was formed in 1971 to organize all Muslim students under the renaissance activities and to promote quality education and Islamic values. MSM conducts annual meetings for students of various fields of study, such as:

- Profcon: The largest gathering of professional students in India. Students from hundreds of professional colleges and universities participate in these 3-day moral classes. The first edition was held at JDT Islam Campus, Calicut in 1995 and the last edition was held at Kodungallur in 2018 November.
- NASCO: National Arabic Students Conference
- Signs: Arts and Science students.
- ILLUMINA: Exclusive conference of medical students

=== Muslim Girls & Women's Movement ===
The female wing is known as Muslim Girls & Women's Movement (MGM), which was formed in 1988. The organization's main objectives are to promote women's education and spread awareness about women's rights in Islam. MGM conducts study classes and conferences exclusively for women.

Besides its feeder organizations, KNM has formed a number of specialized forums to attend to the particular needs of the society. They include:

- Integrated Medical Brotherhood (IMB), medical wing of KNM
- BISMI:
- ECGC: Education and Career Guidance Centre.
- Education Board
- Zakath Cells: Centralized collection and distribution of Zakat
- Hilal Committee
- KNM Publishing Wing
- Gulf Islahi Centre (GIC)

== Conferences ==
Kerala Nadvathul Mujahideen is noted for its annual conferences held during the initial stages of its formation. Great public attention began to be drawn when it decided to hold quinquennial conferences. The enthusiasm with which people have responded to the call of Kerala Nadvathul Mujahideen has been highly encouraging. After every conference the fame and name of Kerala Nadvathul Mujahideen spread far and wide. Many people have participated in these conferences. The flow of people, not only from Kerala, but from other areas of India and from foreign countries, made the conference into a large event. International scholars of repute, religious leaders of all communities, heads of states and governments addressed various sessions of the mega conferences. The theme of the eighth conference was "A century of renaissance", which presented the Kerala Muslim renaissance as a complete model of renaissance to the world, which touches all the levels of society for a complete social reformation.

Sl.no	Year & date	Place	Inauguration	Chief guests	Theme
1	1979 March 8, 9, 10, 11	Pulikkal	Shaikh Mohammed Umar Fallata (Islamic University of Madinah)		
2	1982 February 25, 26, 27, 28	Feroke			
3	1987 January 1, 2, 3, 4	Kuttippuram			
4	1992 December 24, 25, 26, 27	Palakkad			
5	1997 December 18, 19, 20, 21	Kannur	Bilal Philips		
6	2002 December 19, 20, 21, 22	Ernakulam Kochi /Cochin			To creator To peace
7	2008 January 31, Feb 1,2,3	Changaramkulam	Sheik Tharq Saami Sulthaan al Eisa, (chairman of the Ihyau Thuraasul Islami, Kuwait)	Yusuf Estes	Lord's message for the redemption of humanity
8	2012 December 27, 28, 29, 30	Kozhikode	Sheikh Abdul Azeez Abdulla Mohammed Hanafi (Consulate General of Saudi Arabia	Zakir Naik	A century of renaissance
9	2017 December 28, 29, 30, 31	Malappuram			Religion, Tolerance, Coexistence, Peace
10	2022 December 29, 30, 31 and 2023 January 1	Kozhikode			Fearlessness is religion, pride is secularism

== Institutions ==
In Kerala, KNM has set up many arts and science colleges such as Jamia Nadwiyya Edavanna and Jamia Salafia Pulikkal, professional colleges like Jamia Salafia Pharmacy College, Arabic colleges, madrassas, training colleges and orphanages.

=== Jamia Salafiya Pulikkal ===
This is the first institution of the Kerala Nadvathul Mujahideen.

=== Jamia Nadwiyya Edavanna ===
Kerala Nadvathul Mujahideen founded Jamia Nadwiyya Edavanna in 1964. It is a group of education institutions consisting of Nursing College, Training College, Teachers Training Institute, Arts and Science College, Higher Secondary School for Girls, Residential High School, and Thahfeezul Quran. The campus is located in Edavanna, in Malappuram district, Kerala. With a student strength of 2500 during the academic year 2007-8, JNE has grown into a large campus spread over 27 acres of land and sufficient infrastructural facilities. A rich blend of qualified and experienced academics and researchers drawn from various disciplines handle the sessions for the students undergoing the undergraduate and postgraduate degrees at JNE.

== Social welfare ==
The Integrated Medical Brotherhood (IMB) is the medical wing of KNM. They provide services such as distributing medicine, providing free medical treatments to poor patients, home care, advice about health care, and treatments through "pain and palliative clinics".

== Publications ==
KNM Publishing wing published thousands of books in social, educational and religious areas. The weekly Vichinthanam and the monthly Al manar are the publications of KNM official group. KNM Markazuddawa publishes Shabab Weekly, Pudava weekly and Athouheed Magazine.
