= Bappu =

Bappu may refer to:

== People ==
- Salam Bappu, Indian film director
- Tirurangadi Bappu Musliyar, Indian scholar
- Vainu Bappu (1927–1982), Indian astronomer

== Other ==
- 2596 Vainu Bappu, minor planet
- Vainu Bappu Observatory, India
- Wilson–Bappu effect
