= Cherussery Zainuddeen Musliyar =

Indian Islamic scholar

Zain-ul Ulama Cherussery Zainuddeen Musliyar Musliyar
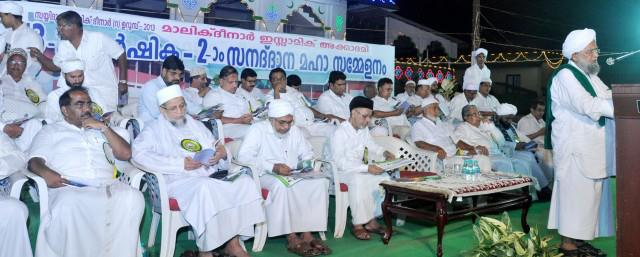
- Cherussery Zainuddeen Musliyar in 2010

General Secretary Samastha Kerala Jamiyyathul Ulama (EK )
- Preceded by: E. K. Aboobacker Musliyar
- Succeeded by: K. Ali Kutty Musliyar

Personal details
- Born: Cherussery Zainuddeen; 1937 Morayur, Malabar District (British India)
- Died: 18 February 2016 (aged 73) Kondotty, Malappuram District, Kerala
- Spouses: Bangalath Mariyumma; Khadeeja
- Parents: Cherussery Muhammed Musliyar (father); Pathummunni (mother)

Cherussery Zainudheen, (1937 - 2016) title Musliyar, known as Zain-ul Ulama, was an Islamic scholar from Kerala, southern India. He succeeded E.K. Aboobacker Musliyar as General Secretary for Samastha Kerala Jamiyyathul Ulama (1996 - 2016).

A member of the mushavara of the Samastha from 1980, Cherussery Zainuddeen Musliyar taught Shari'ah at Darul Huda, Chemmad from 1991 to 2016. He later served as the principal and Pro-chancellor of Darul Huda, Chemmad.

== Life and career ==
Cherussery Zainuddeen was born to Cherussery Muhammed Musliyar and Pathummunni at Morayur, Malabar District in 1937. He was married to Bangalath Mariyumma and Khadeeja.

Cherussery Zainuddeen Musliyar started religious teaching at the age of 22. He worked as a mudarris at Kodangad, Kondotty, Malappuram District for eighteen years. He then worked at Chemmad Jum'ah Masjid, also as a mudarris, for several years.

=== With the Samastha ===
Cherussery Zainuddeen Musliyar was inducted to the mushavara of the Samastha Kerala Jamiyyathul Ulama in 1980.

He taught Shari'ah at Darul Huda, Chemmad from 1991 to 2016. He later served as the principal and Pro-chancellor of Darul Huda, Chemmad. He was also the khatib of Qadiyarakam Jum'ah Masjid, Kondotty.

Musliyar served as the General Secretary of Samastha Kerala Jamiyyathul Ulama from 1996 to 2016. He was also the qadi of hundreds of mahals in different parts of Kerala. He also served as the chairman, Fatwa Committee, the Samastha Kerala Jamiyyathul Ulama.

Cherussery Zainuddeen Musliyar died on 18 February 2016 at a private hospital in Kozhikode and was interred in Darul Huda, Chemmad campus.
