= K. M. Maulavi =

Indian revolutionary

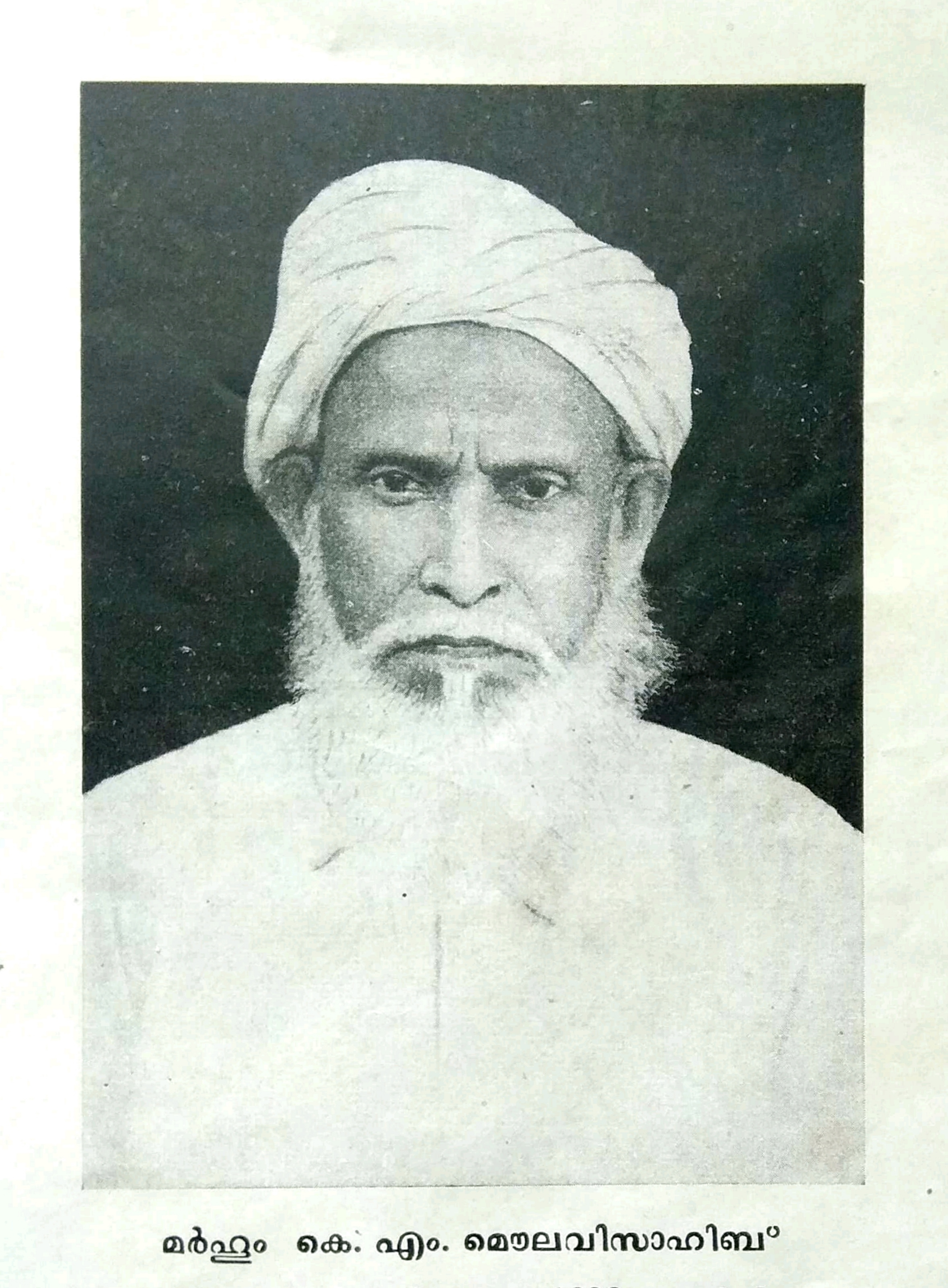
KM Moulavi Sahib

Kaathib Thayyil Mohammed Kutty Musliyar, popularly known as K. M. Moulavi or K. M. Maulavi, was an Indian religious leader. He was a leader of the Muslim League and Islahi Movement from Malabar district. He was a religious scholar who promoted modern education, the Malayalam language, and Muslim women's education. He worked to uplift the Mappila community after the Malabar rebellion.

Maulavi was the founding leader of Kerala Muslim Aikya Sangham (1922), founding president of Kerala Nadvathul Mujahideen (1950) and founding vice president of Indian Union Muslim League (1948) Malabar district committee.

== Early life ==
Maulavi was born in 1886 near Tirurangadi, a municipal town in Malapuram. He was educated by his parents, Thayyil Kunhi Moitheen and Ayisha, who were known for religious scholarship.

He studied under Chalilakath Kunahmed Haji, a prominent scholar at Vazhakkad Darul Uloom Arabic college. Vazhakkad Darul Uloom Arabic college is the first Arabic college in Kerala. While studying there with Chalilakath Kunahmed Haji and serving as a scribe, he earned the name Kaathib.

== Career ==
=== Khilafath movement ===
Maulavi was a leader of the Malabar Khilafath committee. He organized Khilafath meetings from 20 November 1920 in Kondotty to 15 January 1921 in Kozhikkode, in Ernad, Valluvanad, Kozhikkode and Ponnani Taluk, with the intention of inviting the Muslim masses into the Indian national movement.

On 2 February 1921 he served as a founding member and leader of Kerala Majlisul Ulama, Kerala faction of Majlis-ul-Ulama'e Hind along with E. Moidu Moulavi. In the Arabic book Mahakal Khilafat Dismil Khalifa, He urged Mappila Muslims to seek a peaceful resolution to their grievances. When the Malabar protest devolved into armed struggle, he continued to advise the necessity of a peaceful protest.

=== Kodungallur (1921-1932) ===
British police issued an arrest warrant for Maulavi after the Malabar rebellion, but he moved to Kodungallur and lived there for about 11 years. Kottappurath Seethi Mohammed Sahib, the father of K. M. Seethi Sahib and Manappattu Kunjahammed Haji supported him there.

He conducted many Islamic sermons and classes, strengthening reform movement in Kodungallur. He was influenced by Vakkom Moulavi. He criticized superstitious beliefs and orthodoxy practiced among the Muslim community and asked them to distance themselves from such acts. He helped form Kerala m Aikya Sangam in 1922, the first socio-religious organization of Muslims of Kerala. The organization aimed to promote Muslims unity, education and to settle disputes among Muslims.

Due to his new Fatwas, the traditional orthodox Muslims divided into groups. His followers started calling orthodox muslims kafir (unbelievers) for following the traditional ways which was against the teachings of Muhammad and his companions.

== Activism ==
Maulavi was noted for his religious scholarship. His Fathwas was published in Al-Murshid, an Arabi Malayalam magazine. He was the founding leader of Kerala Jamiyathul Ulama (1924) and the founding President of Kerala Nadvathul Mujahideen.

He was the founding leader of Tirurangadi Muslim orphanage. He was the founding joint secretary of Rouzath-ul-Uloom association, parental body of Farook College.

== Politics ==
He started his political life in the Indian National Congress, and left to join the All-India Muslim League due to his dissatisfaction with the INC leadership and their treatment of the Mappilas. He was the founding vice president of Indian Union Muslim League (Madras, 1948) and played a significant role in building the Indian Union Muslim League in Malabar until his death in 1964.

== Publications ==
He was the editor and publisher of Al-Murshid, Al-Irshad and Muslim Aikyam magazines.

List of his books:

1. Nidaun Ilal Alamil Islami (Arabic)
2. Al Ibadathu Val Uboodiyya
3. Annaful Ameem
4. Namaskaram
5. Addua'a wal ibadha
6. Al Wilayathu Wal Karama
7. Qadiyani Vadha Khandanam
8. Manasikul Hajj
9. Islamum Sthreekalum
10. Ma'ashira vili
11. Khathmunnubuvvath
12. Kaifiyyathul Hajj
13. Fath'hul Qawiyy
14. KM Moulaviyude Fatwakal
15. Risalathun fil Bank
16. Jumua Khutuba
