= Al-Buwayti =

Islamic jurist and hadith scholar

Yusuf ibn Yahya al-Buwayti
- أبو يعقوب يوسف بن يحيى البويطي

Personal life
- Born: c. 2nd century AH
- Died: 231 AH (845/846CE) CE Baghdad, Abbasid Caliphate
- Era: Abbasid Caliphate
- Main interest(s): Fiqh, Hadith
- Notable idea(s): Opposition to the doctrine of the created Qur’an

Religious life
- Religion: Islam
- Denomination: Sunni
- Jurisprudence: Shafi'i

Muslim leader
- Influenced by: Al-Shafi'i
- Influenced: Al-Muzani, Al-Rabi' al-Muradi

Abū Yaʿqūb Yūsuf ibn Yaḥyā al-Buwayṭī (d. 231 AH/846 CE) was an Egyptian Islamic jurist, traditionist, and leading early authority of the Shafi'i school. He was among the closest companions and principal transmitters of Imam al-Shafi‘i and succeeded him as the head of his teaching circle in Egypt after his death.

He is regarded by Shafi‘i scholars as one of the earliest systematizers and transmitters of the school’s doctrine and legal methodology.

== Life ==
Al-Buwayti was born in Egypt and belonged to the tribe of Buwayt, from which his nisbah derives. He became a devoted disciple of Imam al-Shafi‘i after the latter settled in Egypt and studied with him until Shafi‘i’s death in 204 AH.

Due to his knowledge, reliability, and close association with Shafi‘i, he was appointed to lead the teaching sessions of the Shafi‘i school in Egypt. Many students sought knowledge from him, and he played a central role in transmitting Shafi‘i’s legal doctrine to later generations.

== Mihna and imprisonment ==
During the Abbasid inquisition (Mihna) under Caliph Al-Wathiq (and begun earlier under Al-Ma'mun), scholars were required to affirm that the Qur’an was created. Al-Buwayti refused to accept this doctrine and openly upheld the traditionalist position that the Qur’an is uncreated.

Because of this refusal, he was arrested, chained, and transported from Egypt to Baghdad. He remained imprisoned and reportedly continued teaching fellow prisoners and worshipping despite harsh conditions until he died in prison in 231 AH.

== Works ==
Although fewer writings survive compared with later jurists, several works are attributed to him, including:

Mukhtasar al-Buwayti – an early summary of Shafi‘i jurisprudence Kitab al-Salat Kitab al-Siyam Kitab al-Shurut legal responsa and transmitted opinions of al-Shafi‘i These writings and transmissions helped preserve early formulations of Shafi‘i doctrine before the later systematizations of scholars such as Al-Juwayni and Al-Ghazali.

== Students ==
Among those who studied under him were:

Al-Muzani – later leading Shafi‘i jurist and author of Mukhtasar al-Muzani Al-Rabi' al-Muradi – major transmitter of Shafi‘i’s works Uthman ibn Sa'id al-Darimi Egyptian students who carried the school’s teachings throughout the region

== Legacy ==
Within the Shafi‘i tradition, al-Buwayti is considered one of the earliest pillars of the school after its founder. His steadfastness during the Mihna is frequently cited in biographical literature as an example of scholarly integrity and adherence to doctrine under political pressure.
