= Kanniyath Ahmed Musliyar =

Indian scholar

- Born: January 17, 1900; Thottekad, Pulpatta, Malappuram district, Kerala, India.
- Died: September 19, 1993 (aged 93)
- Other name: Kanniyath Usthad
- Known for: President of Samastha Kerala Jamiyyathul Ulama

Kanniyath Ahmed Musliyar (Arabic:كنّيت احمد مسليار) former president of Samastha Kerala Jamiyyathul Ulama, was a 20th-century scholar of Muslim Kerala and the teacher of the scholar E. K. Aboobacker Musliyar.

== Early life ==
He was born to Kanniyath Avaran Kutty and Khadeeja in 1900 January 17. He was admitted to Vazhakkad Darul Uloom, founded under the reformation leader Chālilakath Kunh Ahmed Hāji, and in 1926 Qutubi Muhammed Muslliyy became head of the institution and appointed him as his assistant.

== Death ==
He died on 19 September 1993 (Rabeel Akhar 2, 1414).
