= Alathurpadi Dars =

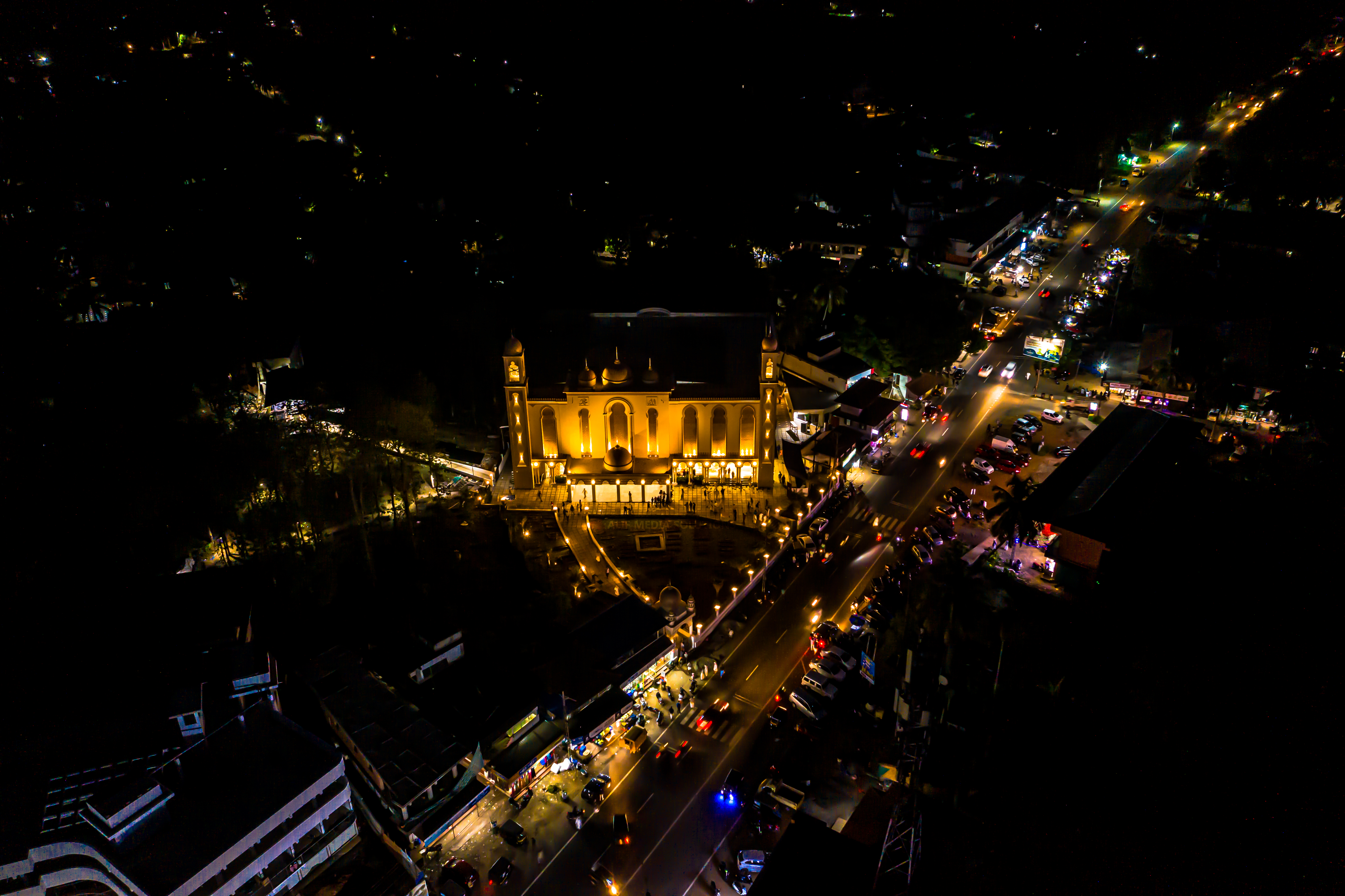
- Night time aerial view of Alathurpadi Dars & Juma Masjid

Location
- Alathurpadi, Melmuri; Malappuram, Kerala 676505; India
- Coordinates: 11.071539230450451°N 76.07414547330625°E

Information
- Type: Higher Education
- Religious affiliation: Samastha Kerala Jem'iyyathul Ulema
- Executive headteacher: Dr.C.K Muhammad Abdurahman Faizy Aripra
- Enrollment: 234 (as of 2020–21)
- Students' Association: Alathurpadi Dars Students' Association (ADSA)
- Publication: Darshanam, Al Zahra
- Alumni name: SUFFA
- Website: https://alathurpadidars.in/

Alathurpadi Dars is an Islamic educational institution in Kerala, India, known for its preservation of traditional values while integrating modern advancements.

Alathurpadi Dars boasts a century-long tradition of knowledge and excellence in academic ranks. The institution is distinguished by the numerous students who have completed their studies there and the teachers who have achieved high ranks in their respective fields. Since 2001, students of this Dars have earned 23 ranks from the prestigious Islamic institution Jamia Nooriyya Arabiyya, Pattikkad, including 12 first ranks, 4 second ranks, and 7 third ranks. Under the leadership of Samasta Mushavara member C.K. Muhammad Abdurahman Faizy, who has served as the principal mudaris since 2000, over two hundred students are currently enrolled in this Dars.

Dr. C.K. Abdurahman Faizy, who graduated with the first rank from Jami'a Nooriyya Arabiyya in 1995, Uwais Ashrafi Faizy and Akbar Sharif Faizy, who serve as teachers at the Dars, are also rank holders of Jamia. Hafiz Mubashir Faizy is responsible for teaching the Quran to students. The Dars offers a seven-year program of religious and secular education for students who have completed their SSLC before pursuing higher studies in religious studies. In addition to religious education, students can obtain Plus Two, Bachelor's, and Master's degrees. Alathurpadi Dars is a center for functional Arabic and Urdu certificate courses run by the central government of India.

== Background ==
The Dars system at Alathurpadi Dars, commonly known as 'Podiyad Dars' by locals, has its roots in the Masjid built in the 1800s and registered in 1886. Located in Podiyad (Alathurpadi), Melmuri, within the Malappuram district, the institution is dedicated to preserving the region's cultural heritage with the support of over 2,000 families in the mahallu.

Throughout its history, Alathurpadi Dars has been led by esteemed scholars such as Ali Musliyar, Aripra Moitheen Haji, KK Abubackar Hazrat, A.P Muhammad Musliyar Kumaramputhur, O.K Sainuddinkutty Musliyar, and KC Jamaluddin Musliyar. Currently, with over 200 students, the Dars system thrives under the leadership of Dr.C.K Abdurahman Faizy, who has served for twenty years since the tenure of the late KC Usthad. Faizy is also a Member of the Samastha Kerala Jem-iyyathul Ulama central mushawara (consultative body).

== Dars; Definition and History ==
The Dars system in Kerala, India, refers to a traditional Islamic education system that has been prevalent in the region for centuries. Rooted in the prophetic teaching method, the Dars system is believed to have been used by Prophet Muhammad to teach and mold his companions. This method has been passed down through generations, from person to person, preserving its core teachings and practices.

The term "Dars" is derived from the Arabic word "Dars" (درس), which means "lesson" or "lecture". The Dars system primarily focuses on teaching Islamic religious texts, theology, jurisprudence, and Arabic language and literature.

Dars institutions, also known as Madrasas in some other states of India, are often associated with mosques and serve as centers for religious learning and the dissemination of Islamic teachings. Students attending these institutions are called "Muta'allim" or "Talib" translating to "seeker of knowledge". Teachers in these institutions are referred to as "Usthad".

The Dars system in Kerala has played a significant role in preserving and promoting Islamic culture and knowledge in the region. In addition to religious teachings, Most of the Dars institutions nowadays offer secular subjects such as mathematics, science, and English language to provide a well-rounded education for their students.
