= Pangil Ahmed Kutty Musliyar =

Indian Islamic scholar

- Born: 1887/1888 (1305 AH); Malabar District, British India
- Died: 20 November 1946; British India
- Known for: Islamic scholar

Pangil Ahmed Kutty (1887/1888–1946), title Musliyar, was an Islamic scholar from Pangu in Malabar District, Madras Presidency in British India.

Ahmed Kutty was born to Nur ud-Din and Pazhedathu Vayottil Thithu in Malabar District. After the initial religious education in Kerala, he joined the al-Baqiyat at Vellore for higher studies.

He co-founded the Samastha Kerala Jamiyyathul Ulama, the principal Sunni-Shafi'i scholarly body in northern Kerala, in 1926.
