= K. Ali Kutty Musliyar =

Indian Islamic scholar (1945–2026)

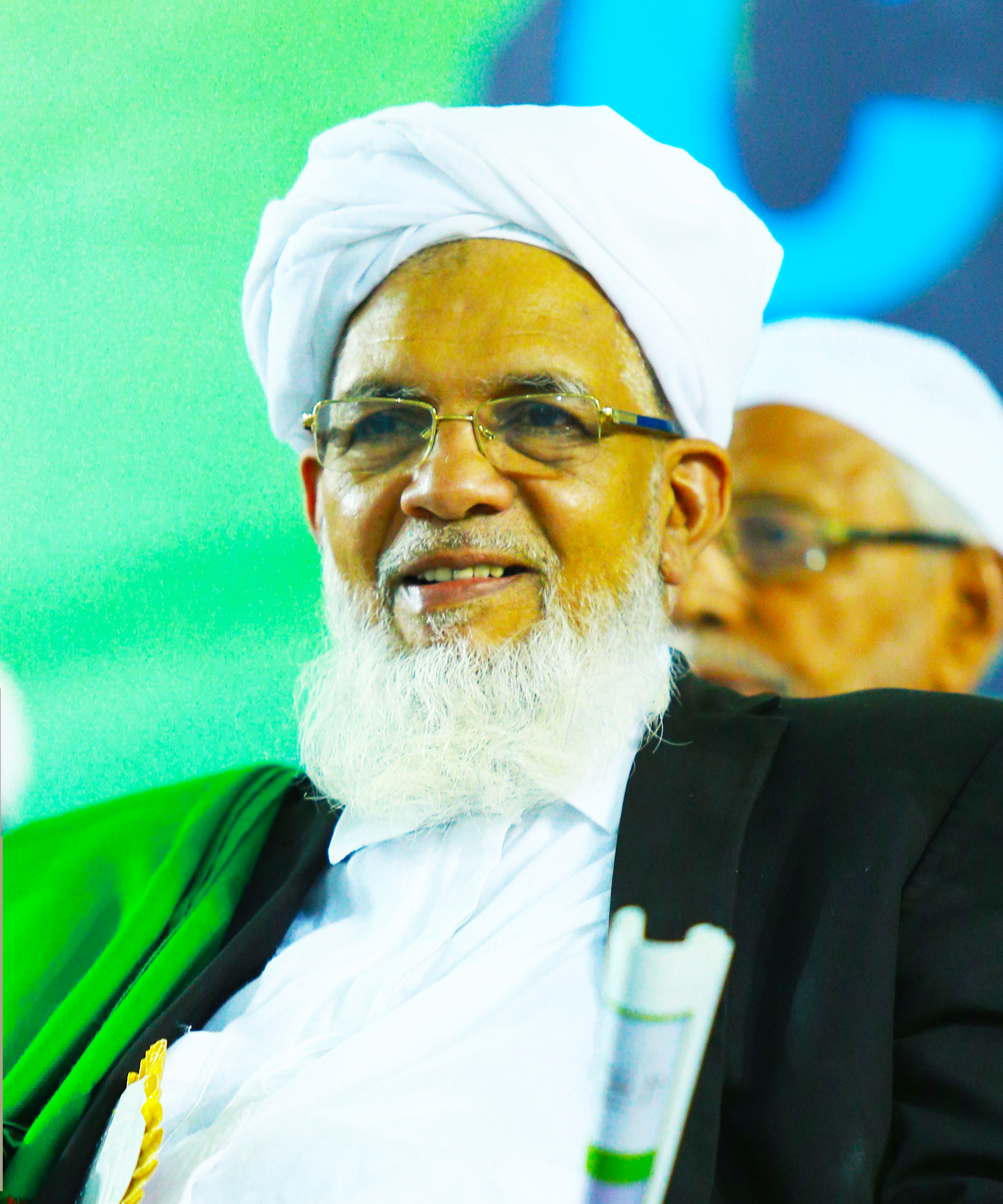
- Ali Kutty Musliyar in 2016

General Secretary Samastha Kerala Jamiyyathul Ulama
- Preceded by: Cherussery Zainuddeen Musliyar

Principal Jami'a Nooriya Arabic College

Personal details
- Born: 1945 Thirurkad, Madras Province, British India (now Malappuram District, Kerala, India)
- Died: 23 July 2026 (aged 81) Thirurkad, Malappuram District, Kerala, India
- Education: Post Graduation (Islamic Studies)
- Alma mater: Jami'a Nooriya Arabic College
- Occupation: Islamic scholar

K. Ali Kutty Musliyar (1945 – 23 July 2026) was an Indian Islamic scholar from Kerala. As of 2022, he was General Secretary, Samastha Kerala Jamiyyathul Ulama (EK Samastha), the body of Sunni Shafi'i scholars in northern Kerala.

As of 2014 he was Principal, Jami'ya Nooriya Arabic College, Perinthalmanna (2003–2026) and President, Ponnani Maunathul Islam Arabic College.

== Life and career ==
=== Early life ===
Ali Kutty Musliyar was born in 1945. He completed his post-graduate degree in Islamic Studies from Jami'ya Nooriya Arabic College, Perinthalmanna in 1968 (Moulavi Fazil Faizi).

He was appointed qadi of the village of Thirurkad in 1965.

=== Career ===
In 1970, Ali Kutty Musliyar became the Perintalmanna Taluk General Secretary, Samastha Kerala Jamiyyathul Ulama and in 1976 Malappuram District Joint Secretary of the Samastha. In 1986 he was inducted to the mushavara of the Samastha and in 1991 he became General Secretary, Sunni Yuvajana Sangham (SYS). In 1979 he started teaching at Jami'ya Nooriya (Arabic Literature till 1991 and the Fiqh from 1991) and was appointed the Principal in 2003.

As of 2022 he was the General Secretary, Samastha Kerala Jem-iyyathul Ulama.

=== Death ===
Musliyar died on 23 July 2026, at the age of 81.

== Positions ==
- Member, All India Muslim Personal Law Board (from 2008)
- Vice President, Sunni Mahallu Federation (SMF)
- Vice President, Samastha Kerala Matha Vidyabhyasa Board (from 2009)
- Kasaragod Qadi (from 2013)
- Member, International Fiqh Council, under Muslim World League
- Controller of Examinations, Coordination of Islamic Colleges (CIC-Wafy), Kerala
- General Secretary, Sunni Yuvajana Sangham (1992 - 2016)
- Khatib and Qadi, Thirurkad Mahallu (from 1965)

=== Educational institutions ===
- President, Ponnani Maunathul Islam Arabic College (from 2000)
- Vice President, Kerala State Muslim Orphanage Coordination Committee (from 2004)
- General Secretary, Vettattoor Anvarul Huda Islamic Complex
- Vice President, Thirurkad Anvarul Huda Islamic Complex
- General Secretary, Anvarul Huda Islamic Complex
- General Manager, Anvarul Islam Institution, Thiroorkad, Kerala (from 1970)
- President, Vadakara Hujjathul Islam Arabic College (from 2005)
- General Secretary KCJM, Payyanad, Manjeri

=== Chairman ===
- Haj Committee of Kerala (2003–2006)
- Vice chairman, Haj Committee of India (2006–09)

== Publications ==
- Vice Chairman, Suprabhaatham daily (from 2014)
- Sunni Afkar (from 2005)
- Al-Muallim monthly (from 2009)
- Al-Noor monthly, in Arabic (from 2009)
- Muslim Lokam Year Book
