= Chemmad =

Chemmad ചെമ്മാട്
- Town
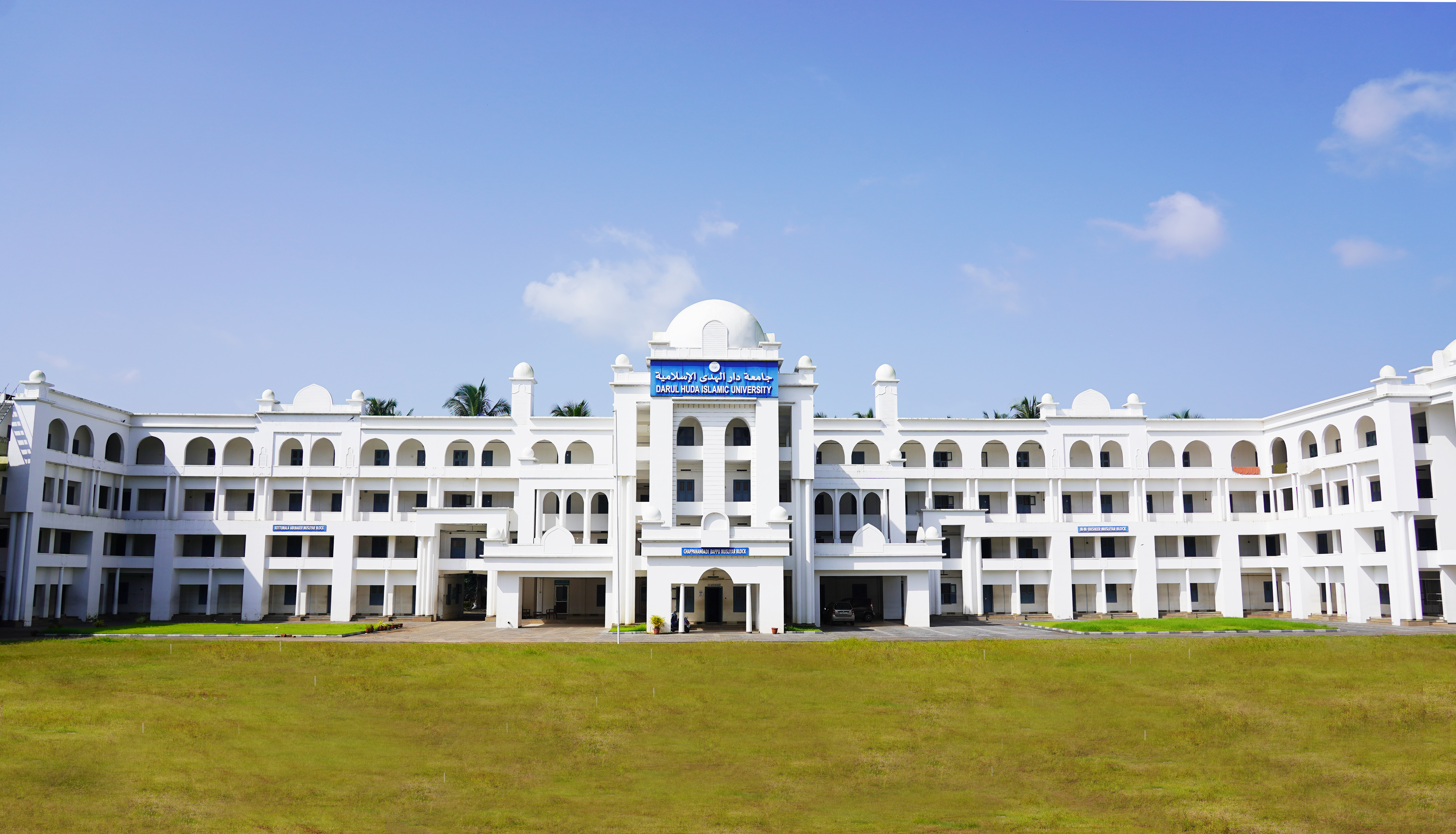
- Main block of Darul Huda Islamic University, Chemmad

- Location in Kerala, India Chemmad (India)
- Coordinates: 11.042°N 75.911°E
- Country: India
- State: Kerala
- District: Malappuram

Area
  - Total: 11.56 km^{2} (4.46 sq mi)
- Elevation: 7 m (23 ft)

Population (2011)
  - Total: 43,632
  - Density: 3,774/km^{2} (9,776/sq mi)

Languages
  - Official: Malayalam, English
- Time zone: UTC+5:30 (IST)
- Postal code: 676306
- Vehicle registration: KL-65

Chemmad is a rapidly growing commercial hub and the administrative headquarters of the Tirurangadi Taluk in the Malappuram district of Kerala, India. Located approximately 7 km east of the Parappanangadi railway station, it features amenities like the HiLITE Countryside Mall, local tourist spots, and the Darul Huda Islamic University.

== Geography ==
Chemmad is located approximately 7 km (4.3 mi) east of Parappanangadi railway station and falls under the jurisdiction of the Tirurangadi Police Station.

=== Education establishments ===
- KMMMO Arabic College, located on Parappanangadi–Chemmad Road, is an affiliated college of the University of Calicut offering BA programmes with modern infrastructure.
- Darul Huda Islamic University (DHIU), founded in 1986 and upgraded to a university in 2009.

=== Social and administrative centers ===
The main hub of Tirurangadi Taluk and Municipality is located in Chemmad:

- Taluk Headquarters
  - Tirurangadi Taluk Office
  - Mini Civil Station and Sub-Registrar Office are located in Chemmad Town.

=== Health Sector ===
Tirurangadi Taluk Headquarters Hospital (Government Hospital) is located near Chemmad Town.

=== Private & Specialty Hospitals ===
Lailas Hospital Al Rayhan Eye Hospital & College , Imrans Eye Hospital Tirurangadi Nursing Homes

=== Public Transport ===
There is a large private bus stand in the heart of Chemmad Town, which provides easy connectivity to Malappuram, Kozhikode, Parappanangadi and Tirur areas.

=== Religious and pilgrimage centers ===
There are several places of worship of historical and spiritual importance in and around Chemmad, which has a friendly atmosphere:

Mampuram Makham (Pilgrimage Center): Mampuram Makham, a famous pilgrimage center in Malabar, is located just 2 kilometers from Chemmad town on the banks of the Kadalundipuzha river. Thousands of pilgrims from all castes and religions visit this place every day, thanks to the spiritual leader Mampuram Thangal (Sayyid Alavi Thangal).

Chemmad Valiya Juma Masjid: The main place of worship located in the center of the town.

Thrikkulam Shiva Temple: This is a very ancient Hindu temple located just about one kilometer from Chemmad town.

Panthalodi Tharavad Temple: Another important place of worship near Chemmad town.

== Gallery ==
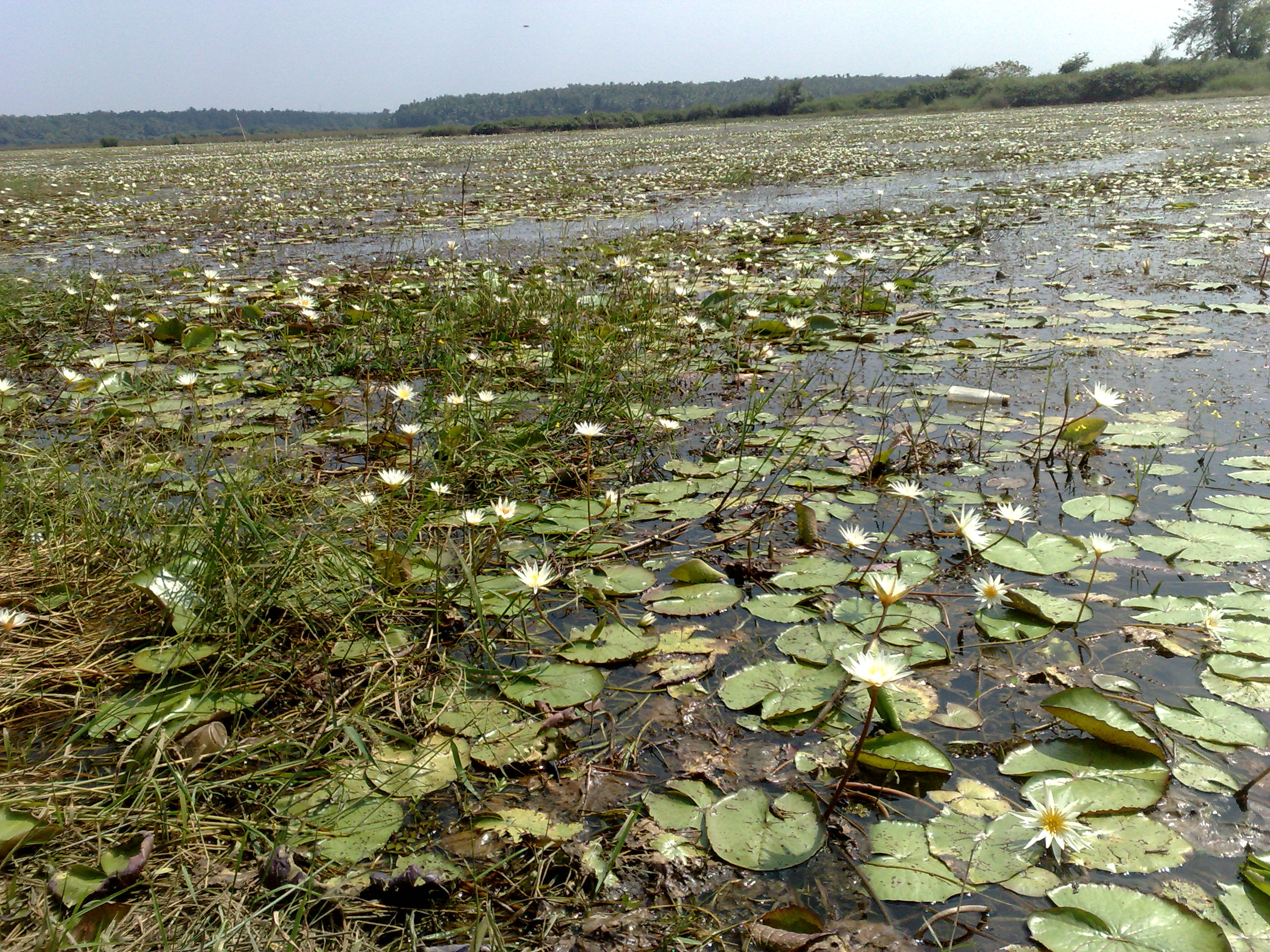
Water lily field in Chemmad

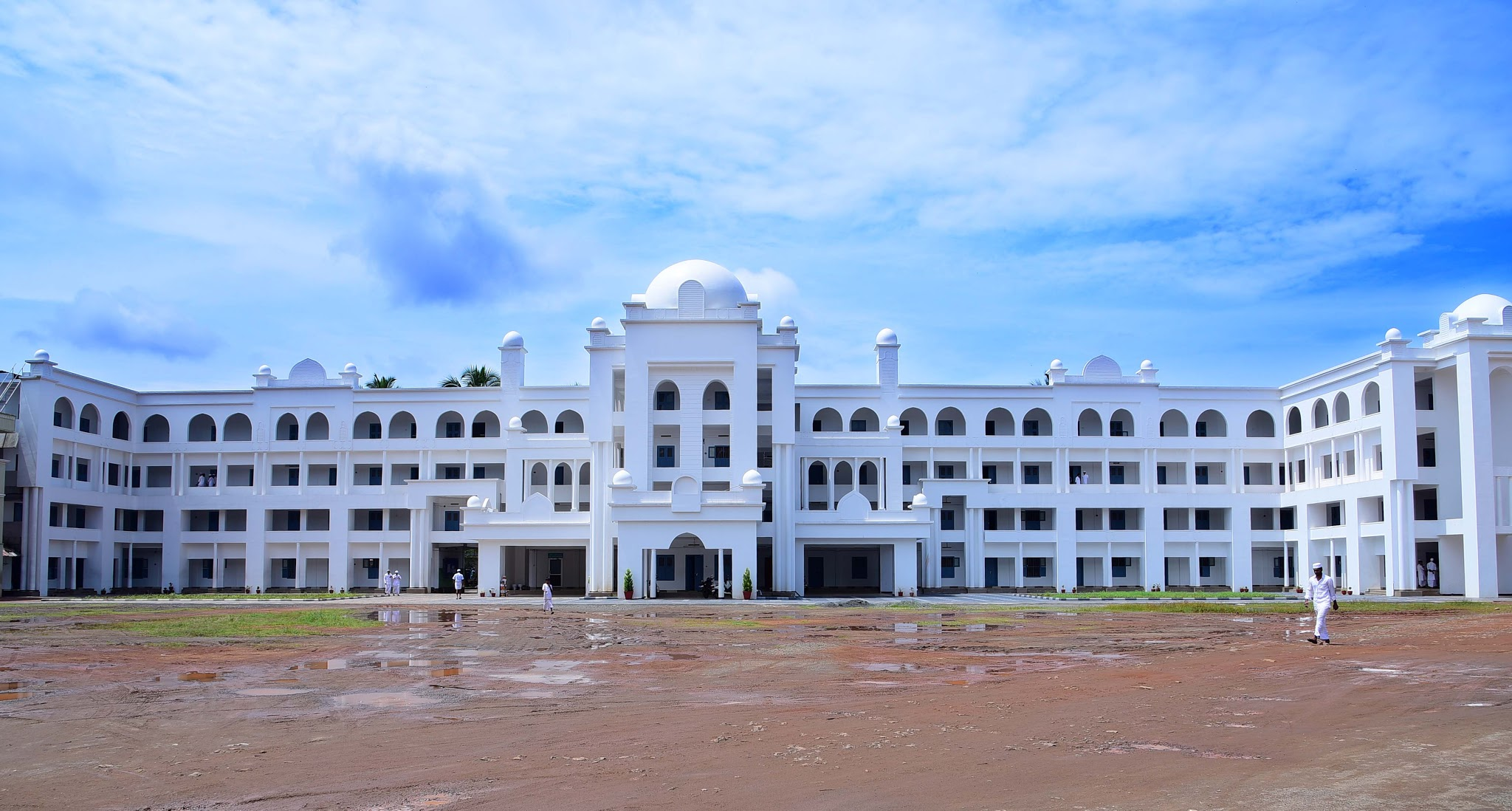
Darul Huda Islamic University campus

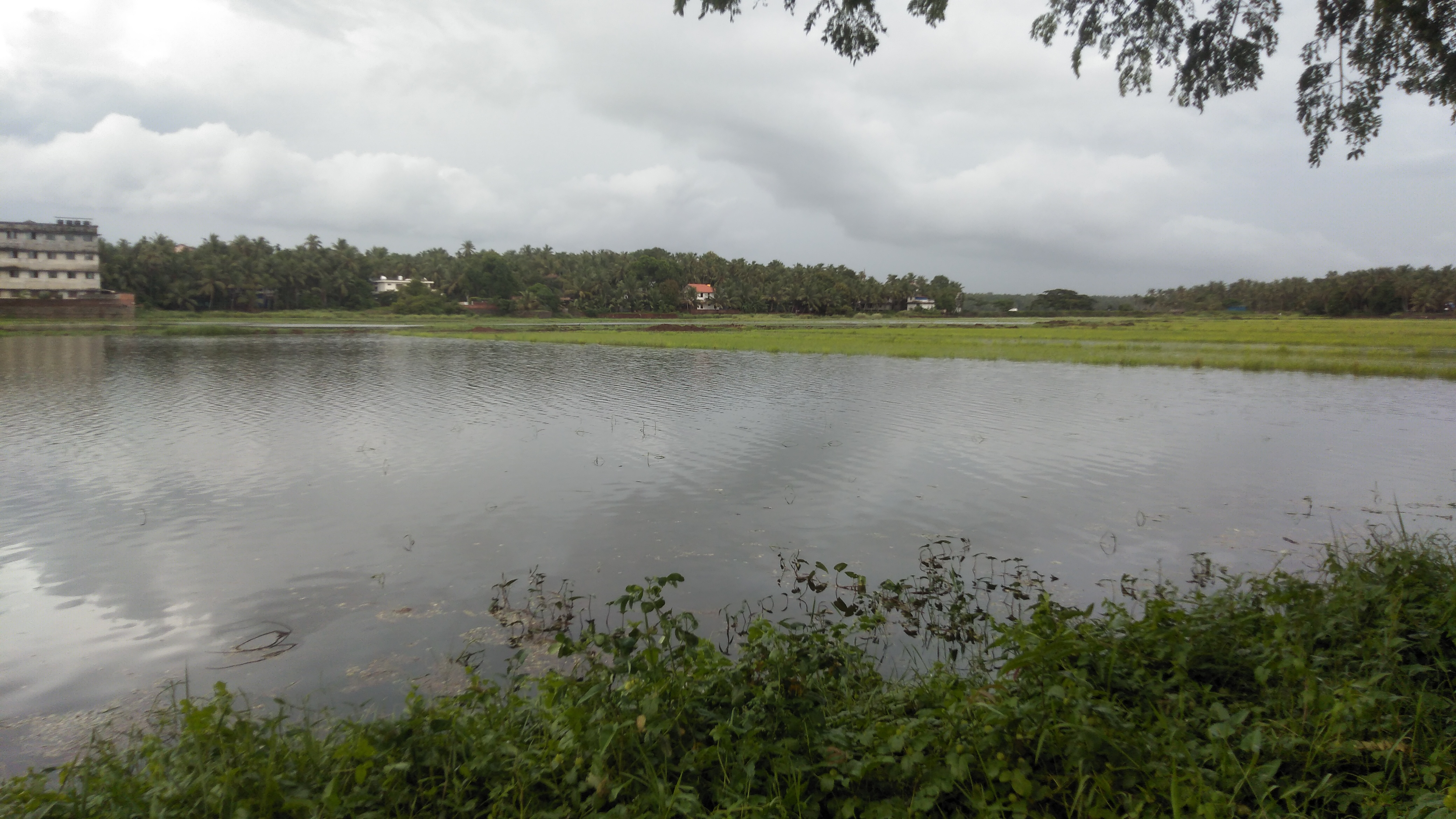
A paddy field in Chemmad

== See also ==
- Tirurangadi
