= Varakkal Mullakoya Thangal =

Indian spiritual leader

Habib Abdurahman Bin Muhammad Ba-Alawi
- Born: 1840; Calicut (British India)
- Died: 16 December 1932 (aged 91–92)
- Occupation: Islamic scholar
- Spouses: Zaynab Beevi; Fatima Beevi

Habib Abdurahman Bin Muhammad Ba-Alawi (1840 – 16 December 1932) also known as Sayyid Varakkal Mullakoya, was an Islamic scholar from Calicut (now Kozhikode) in Malabar District, Madras Presidency. He was one of the descendants of Alawi Sayyids who migrated from Yemen.

Mullakoya Thangal was employed in service of the Arakkal Royal family of Cannanore. He also maintained healthy contacts with the British officials posted to Malabar District. He co-founded the Samastha Kerala Jamiyyathul Ulama, the principal Sunni-Shafi'i scholarly body in northern Kerala, in 1926.

== Life and career ==
Varakkal Mullakoya was born at Puthiyangadi, Calicut in 1840 to Sayyid Muhammed Ba-Alawi and Marakkarathu Sherifa Cheriya Beevi in a prosperous Yemeni-origin sayyid (thangal) family. He married twice, first to Zainaba Koyyamma Beevi, and after her death, to Fatima Beevi.

The thangal was educated in Arabic, Persian and Urdu. He also learned English from the British officials employed in Calicut.

=== Formation of Samastha ===
Mullakoya Thangal served as the founding president of Samastha Kerala Jem-iyyathul Ulama, the principal Sunni-Shafi'i scholarly body in northern Kerala (1926). He occupied this position until his death on 16 December 1932.
