= E. K. Aboobacker Musliyar =

Islamic scholar

Shams-ul-Ulama E. K. Aboobacker Musliyar Shamsul Ulama
- E. K. Aboobacker Musliyar
- Born: 1914; Paramblikadavu, near Kozhikode, Kerala, India.
- Died: 19 August 1996 (aged 81–82); Kozhikkode
- Burial place: Varakkal in Kozhikkode dist,. of Keralam
- Citizenship: Indian
- Education: Baqawi (Post-graduate in Islamc Sharia)
- Occupation: Community Leader
- Organization: Samastha Kerala Jem-iyyathul Ulama
- Known for: Islamic Scholar in Sunni Islam Sufi Shafi'i school Ash'arism
- Predecessor: Paravanna Abul Basheer K.P.A. Muhiyiddin Kutty Musliyar
- Successor: Cherussery Zainuddeen Musliyar
- Spouse: Fathima Hajjumma
- Parents: Koyakkutty Musliyar (father); Beevikkutty (mother)

E. K. Aboobacker Musliyar, known by followers as the Shams-ul-Ulama (lit. "the Sun of the Scholars"), was a Shafi'i scholar and community leader from Kerala, south India. He served as the General Secretary of the Samastha-Kerala Jam'iyyat al-'Ulama', the principal Sunni-Shafi'i scholarly body in Kerala, from 1957 to 1996.

Ezhuthachan Kandi Aboobacker was born in 1914, to E. K. Koya Kutty and Adiyottil Fathima, at Parambilkadavu, near the city of Kozhikode. After the initial education from a number of Kerala-based scholars, he joined the al-Bakiyat-us-Salihat College at Vellore for higher studies.

He later served as the principal of Jamia Nuriya Arabic College, Pattikkad.

He became the principal of Jamia Darussalam Al Islamiyya, Nandi for 20 years, after he had left Jamia Nuriya Arabic College, Pattikkad.

E. K. Aboobacker Musliyar died on 19 August 1996.
