= Kundoor =

- Village
- Location in Kerala, India Kundoor (India)
- Coordinates: 11.0084643°N 75.9232492°E
- Country: India
- State: Kerala
- District: Malappuram
- PIN: 676320

Kundoor is a village in Nannambra Grama Panchayath in Malappuram district state of Kerala, India. The village is situated close to the town of Tirurangadi, about 3 km away from Venniyour, National Highway 66 (India).

== Places ==
- Kundoor North (Chethey)
- Kundoor Athani
- kundoor Kallathadakki
- Kundoor Jayaram Padi
- Kundoor Moolakkal
- Kundoor Usthad Maqam, the grave of Sheikh Abdul Khadir Musliyar Kundoor. Kundoor Uroos is the annual festival based in the grave.
- Chakkappathayam

Kundoor thoorpil masjid magfira Kundoor marakkappadam

== Notable person ==
- Sheikh Abdul Khadir Musliyar, Kundoor
- TT Abdulla Master
- K Ayamu Sahib
- Kunjhali Haji MC
- Kunjhimarakar
- Saneef Thottithodika

== Transportation ==
The nearest airport is at Kozhikode. The nearest major railway station is at Parappanangadi.
