= Kutubi Muhammed Musliyar =

Indian scholar (1299–1385)

- Born: 1881 CE (1299 AH); Kerala, India
- Died: Shawwal 1965 (aged 83–84) CE (1385 AH)
- Other name: Kutubi Muhammed Musliyar

Kutubi Muhammed Musliyar (Arabic: كتبي محمّد مسليار) was a scholar from Kerala and advisor of Samastha Kerala Jamiyyathul Ulama.

== Early life ==
He was born to Cheruchal Ahmed in 1881 CE (1299 AH), at Cheppiyalam village. After primary education there, he was admitted to Talakkaduthur Juma Masjid Darse (Masjid based college) and studied under Chalilakath Kunahmed Haji at Tirurangadi Tarammal Masjid Darse.

== Personal life ==
He married Mariam, daughter of Ahmed Musliyar Chokli Katilpidikayil, and they had three sons and five daughters. Later he married Tattumma, daughter of Parappanangadi Kunnala and had a son, Abdul Rahman Musliyar.

== Death ==
He died in Shawwal 1965 CE (1385 AH), at his residence at Chokli.
