= Darul Huda Islamic University =

Private university in Kerala, India

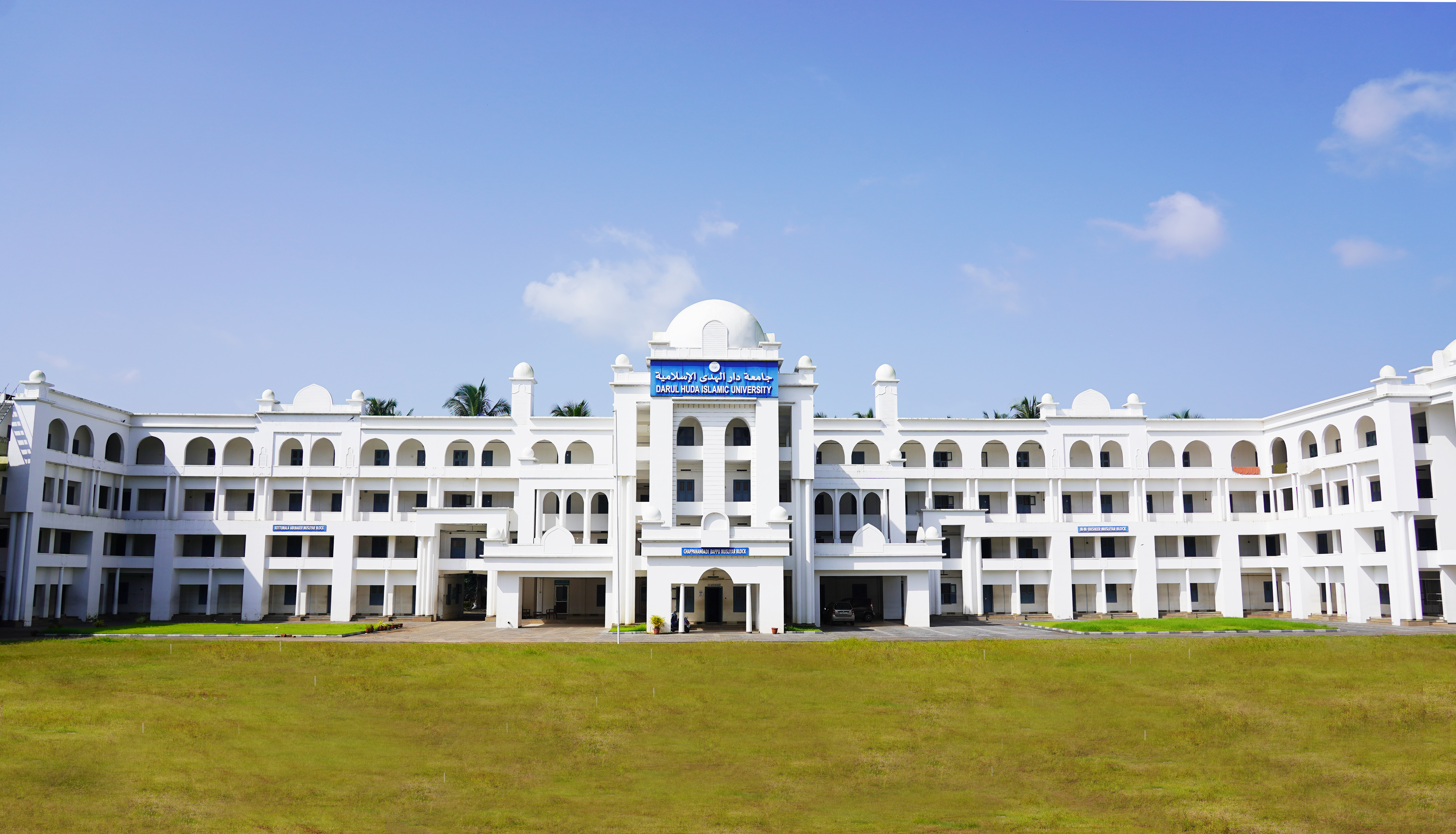
- Motto: Thaleem, Tharbiya, Dawa
- Type: Islamic University, Private university
- Established: 1986 (40 years ago)
- Parent institution: Darul Huda Islamic Academy
- Affiliations: League of Islamic Universities
- Religious affiliation: Sunni
- President: Sayyid Sadiq Ali Shihab Thangal
- Vice-Chancellor: Bahauddeen Muhammed Nadwi
- Location: Chemmad, Malappuram, Kerala, India; 11.050°N 75.904°E
- Website: dhiu.in

Darul Huda Islamic University is an unaccredited private Islamic university in Malappuram district, Kerala, India. It is equivalent to an unaided and non-affiliated Indian madrasa. Established in 1986 it is a Sunni institution for the training of Islamic scholars in India. It offers both undergraduate and postgraduate programs.

Since 2010, it has been a member of the League of Islamic Universities, Cairo, Egypt. However the UGC, India's only official body with the power to accredit universities, does not list it as a university.

Sayyid Sadiq Ali Shihab Thangal serves as the President of the Managing Committee, while Bahaudheen Muhammed Nadwi is the Vice President, and Haji U. Muhammad Shafi is the General Secretary.

== Main campus ==
Darul Huda University campus is located in Chemmad, Malappuram, Kerala area, which is commonly known as 'Hidaya Nagar' of Chemmad city. The Darul Huda University is a part of 100 acres owned by the DHIU.

== Affiliated colleges ==
Darul Huda Islamic University has a network of affiliated colleges across Kerala and other regions. These institutions offer programs aligned with DHIU’s academic and religious curriculum.

== See also ==
- List of Islamic educational institutions
