= Tirurangadi Bappu Musliyar =

Tirurangadi Bappu Musliyar was a Muslim scholar, poet and of one of the traditionalist Sunni Muslims in Kerala, India. He was born in 1933 at Tanur, near Tirur in Malappuram district. He died on 7 August 2014. He was the member of Samastha Kerala Jamiat Ulema (Kerala). Known as Busoori of Kerala, Bappu Musliyar was an Arabic language expert and also a poet.

== Awards ==
- Imam Busuri Award
