= Kalambadi Muhammad Musliyar =

Indian Sunni Muslim religious scholar

Kalambadi Muhammed Musliyar
- Born: 1934; Kalambadi, Malappuram Kerala state, India.
- Died: 2 October 2012 (aged 77–78)
- Known for: Former president of Samastha Kerala Jem-iyyathul Ulama
- Website: www.samastha.net

Kalambadi Muhammad Musliyar (1934 – 2 October 2012) was a Sunni Muslim religious scholar from Kerala state and president of Samastha Kerala Jamiyyathul Ulama (EK Faction), one the largest muslim organisation of Kerala, from September 2004 until his death on 2 October 2012.

== Early life ==
Kalambadi Usthad was born in an orthodox Muslim family in Kalambadi, a village in Malappuram city, Kerala. After the primary studies in native land, he went to Baqiyathu Swalihath, Vellore, Tamil Nadu. After being graduated from the religious institution of Baqiyath, he returned to the native land and carried on the educational field for years. He was 2nd rank holder in Baqavi graduation.

== In Samastha Kerala Jem-iyyathul Ulama ==
He was selected to the Mushavara during the early period of 1971 and was elected as president in 2004.

== Demise ==
The leader of the largest Muslim outfit in Kerala, respected Kalambadi Muhammad Musliyar died on Tuesday, 2 October 2012 in a private hospital in Perinthalmanna following a heart attack.
