= Jami'a Nooriyya Arabic College =

Institute of religious learning in India

- Type: Arabic College
- Established: 1963
- Religious affiliation: Sunni-Shafi'i Law
- Principal: Vacant
- Location: Pattikkad, near Perinthalmanna, Malappuram district, Kerala, India; 11.0164°N 76.2284°E
- Language: Arabic; English; Malayalam
- Website: www.jamianooriya.in

Jami'a Nooriyya is an Arabic college, or an educational institute of higher religious learning, the equivalent of south Indian madrasa, located at Pattikkad, near Perinthalmanna in Malappuram district, Kerala. Established in 1963 by Sheikh Noorul Mashaikh Sayyid Ahmad Mohiuddin Jeelani R.A, the founder of the Jami'a, it is the premier orthodox or traditionalist Sunni-Shafi'i institution for the training of the Islamic scholars in Kerala.

Jami'a Nooriyya is managed by Samastha Kerala Jam'iyyat al-'Ulama', the principal Sunni-Shafi'i scholarly body in Kerala. The institute carries forward the old Ponnani tradition of scholar training. The Nizami curriculum used at Jami'a Nooriyya is a modified version of the syllabus utilized at the al-Baqiyyat-us-Salihat College at Vellore (with Shafi'i Law for Hanafi Law).

Jami'a Nooriyya celebrates its anniversary in February–March of every year.

== Noorul Ulama Students' Association ==
The Noorul Ulama Students' Association (NUSA) is the official student organization of Jami'a Nooriyya Arabic College, established to nurture creative talents among students. Founded on 24 June 1964 by Thazhekkode Kunjalavi Usthad and named by Kottumala Ustad, it was initially presided over by Syed Ali Bafaki Thangal. NUSA represents over 7,000 alumni (known as "Faizys") and operates sub-wings in areas such as art, literature, culture, health, and spirituality to enhance students' organizational and language skills.

The association organizes events including conferences and exhibitions. In 2023, NUSA hosted a Quran exhibition where student Muhammad Dilshah displayed a 500-meter handwritten Quran, earning a Guinness World Record.

== Jannathul Uloom Arabic College ==
Jannathul Uloom Arabic College
- الكلية العربية جنة العلوم
- Former name: Jannaathul Uloom Madrassa
- Motto: لَيْسَ العِلْمُ مَا حُفِظَ، إِنَّما العِلْمُ مَا نَفَعَ
- Type: Islamic education
- Established: 9 July 1967
- Founder: Shaikhuna E. K. Hasan Musliyar
- Affiliations: Jami'a Nooriyya Arabic College
- Officer in charge: T. K. Saifudheen Uloomi
- President: Sayyid Sadiq Ali Shihab Thangal
- Principal: Usthad N. A. Hussain Mannani
- Location: Palakkad, Kerala, 678014, India; 10.77354°N 76.64629°E
- Campus: Urban
- Website: www.jannathululoom.blogspot.com

Jannathul Uloom Arabic College (JUAC) is a religious educational institute affiliated with the Sunni Muslim community in Palakkad, Kerala, India. Founded in 1967 by Shaikhuna E. K. Hasan Musliyar, it was the second Islamic Arabic college in Kerala established by Sunni Muslims, following Jami'a Nooriyya Arabic College, and the first of its kind in Palakkad district.

=== Notable alumni ===
- Hakeem Faizy Adrisseri – Rector of CIC and the first Indian to be nominated to the executive board of the League of Islamic Universities.
