= Chalilakath Kunahmed Haji =

Malayali Sunni scholar (1866–1919)

- Born: 1866; Adrishery, Kerala, India.
- Died: 1919 (aged 52–53)
- Other name: Chalilakath
- Occupation: Religious teacher
- Known for: Islamic scholar

Chalilakath Kunhahammad Haji (Arabic: جاللكت كنّ احمد الحاج 1866–1919) was a Malayali Sunni scholar and Islamic teacher. He is known for a madrassa (Islamic school) system in the southern Indian state of Kerala.
