= Shafi'i school =

School of Islamic jurisprudence

The Shafi'i school (Note: Arabic: ٱلْمَذْهَب ٱلشَّافِعِيّ, romanized: al-Madhhab al-Shāfiʿī) is one of the four major schools of Islamic jurisprudence within Sunni Islam, belonging to the Ahl al-Hadith tradition. It is named after the Muslim scholar, jurist, and traditionist al-Shafi'i (c. 767–820 CE) of the early 9th century.

Like the other schools, the Shafiʽis rely on the Quran and the sound books of hadiths as primary sources of law. The Shafi'i school affirms the authority of both divine law-giving (the Quran and the Sunna) and human speculation regarding the Law. Where passages of Quran or the hadiths are ambiguous, the school seeks guidance of qiyas (analogical reasoning). The ijma (consensus of scholars) was "accepted but not stressed". The school rejected the dependence on local traditions as the source of legal precedent and rebuffed the Ahl al-Ra'y (personal opinion) and the Istihsan (juristic discretion).

The Shafi'i school is followed by more than 350 million people, comprising around 17.5% of the Muslim population worldwide. As such, it is the third-largest Sunni school after the Hanafi and Maliki schools. The Shafi'i school is predominant in the Horn of Africa, North Caucasus, Southeast Asia, Lower Egypt, Qatar, Kerala and among the majority of the Kurdish Muslim population throughout Iraq, Syria and Turkey. The Shafiʽi school was the largest school followed in the Middle East until the rise of the Ottomans and the Safavids who patronized the Hanafi and Ja'fari schools respectively.

== Principles ==
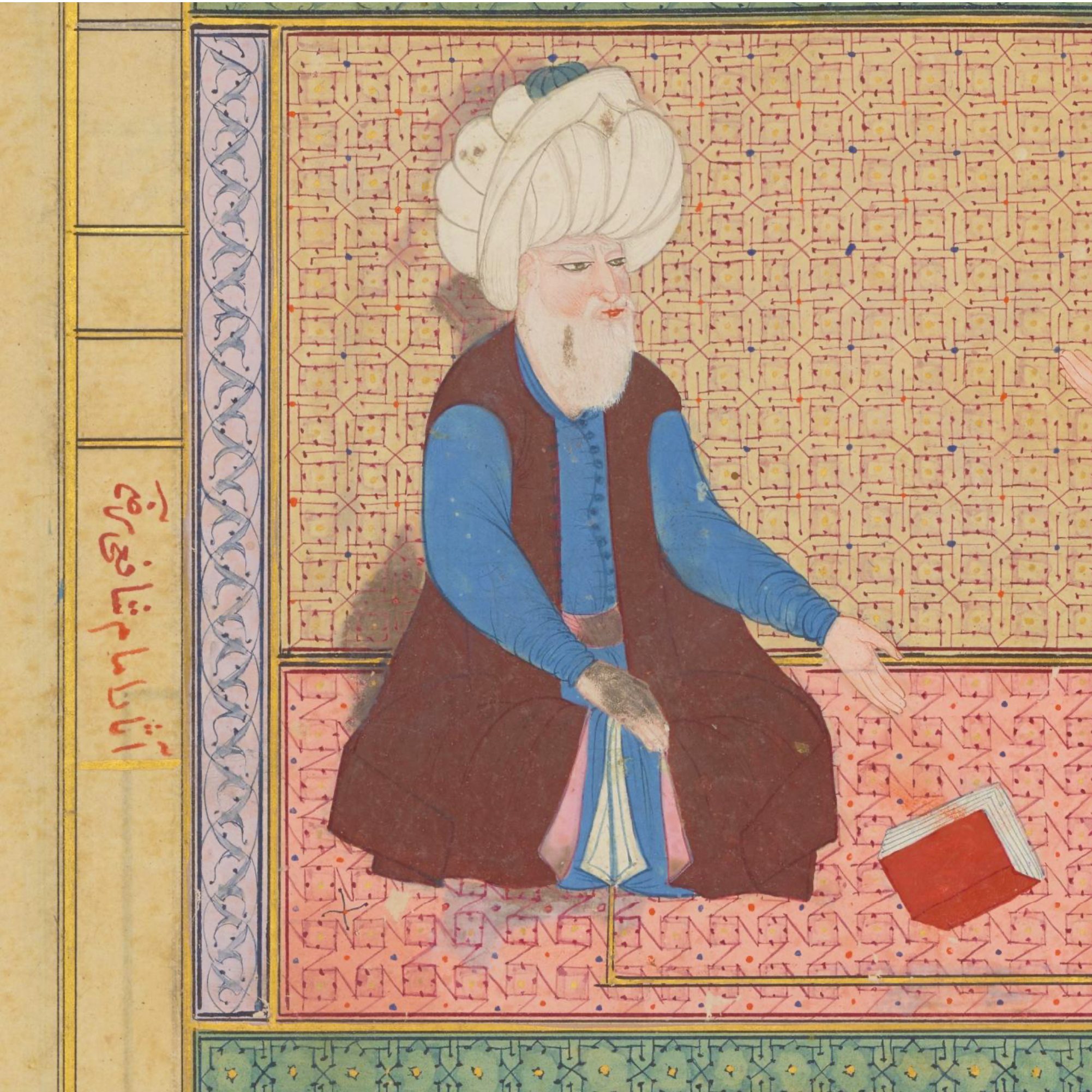
Illustration of a 1585-1590 Ottoman manuscript depicting Muḥammad ibn Idrīs al-Shāfiʿī

The fundamental principle of the Shafiʽi thought depends on the idea that "to every act performed by a believer who is subject to the Law there corresponds a statute belonging to the Revealed Law or the Shari'a". This statute is either presented as such in the Qurʾān or the Sunnah or it is possible, by means of analogical reasoning (Qiyas), to infer it from the Qurʾān or the Sunnah.

Al-Shafiʽi was the first jurist to insist that Ḥadīth were the decisive source of law (over traditional doctrines of earlier thoughts). In order of priority, the sources of jurisprudence according to the Shafiʽi thought, are:

=== The Foundation (al asl) ===
- Qurʾān — the sacred scripture of Islam.
- Sunnah — defined by Al-Shāfiʿī as "the sayings, the acts, and the tacit acquiescence of Prophet Muhammad as related in solidly established traditions".

The school rejected dependence on local community practice as the source of legal precedent.

=== Ma'qul al-asl ===
- Qiyas with Legal Proof or Dalil Shari'a — "Analogical reasoning as applied to the deduction of juridical principles from the Qurʾān and the Sunnah."
  - Analogy by Cause (Qiyas al-Ma'na/Qiyas al-Illa)
  - Analogy by Resemblance (Qiyas al-Shabah)
- Ijmā' — consensus of scholars or of the community ("accepted but not stressed").

The concept of Istishab was first introduced by the later Shafiʽi scholars. Al-Shafiʽi also postulated that "penal sanctions lapse in cases where repentance precedes punishment".

== Risālah ==
The groundwork legal text for the Shafiʽi law is al-Shafiʽi's al-Risala ("the Message"), composed in Egypt. It outlines the principles of Shafiʽi legal thought as well as the derived jurisprudence. A first version of the Risālah, al-Risalah al-Qadima, produced by al-Shafiʽi during his stay in Baghdad, is currently lost.

== Differences from Mālikī and Ḥanafī thoughts ==
Al-Shāfiʿī fundamentally criticised the concept of judicial conformism (the Istiḥsan).

=== With Mālikī view ===
- Shafiʽi school argued that various existing local traditions may not reflect the practice of Muhammad (a critique to the Mālikī thought). The local traditions, according to the Shāfiʿī understanding, thus cannot be treated as sources of law.

=== With Ḥanafī view ===
- The Shafiʽi school rebuffed the Ahl al-Ra'y (personal opinion) and the Istiḥsān (juristic discretion). It insisted that the rules of the jurists could no longer be invoked in legal issues without additional authentications. The school refused to admit doctrines that had no textual basis in either the Qurʾān or Ḥadīths, but were based on the opinions of Islamic scholars (the Imams).
- The Shafiʽi thinking believes that the methods may help to "substitute man for God and Prophet Muhammad, the only legitimate legislators" and "true knowledge and correct interpretation of religious obligations would suffer from arbitrary judgments infused with error".

== Proximity of Shia and Shafi'i ==
Shia jurists, based on the narrations of Fourteen Innocents, believe that "In the Name of God, the Most Gracious, the Most Merciful" is part of all the surahs of the Qur'an, except the Surah of Al-Bara'ah (Surah At-Tawbah). And "Shafi'i" jurists, unlike other Sunni schools, agree with the Shi'a opinion, and consider "In the name of God, Most Gracious, Most Merciful" as part of all the surahs of the Qur'an. Therefore, it is considered obligatory to recite it in a loud voice in the Jahriyeh prayer.

== History ==
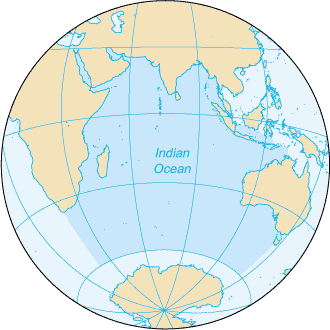
Shafiʽi school is predominantly found across the Indian Ocean littoral.

Al-Shāfiʿī (c. 767–820 AD) visited most of the great centres of Islamic jurisprudence in the Middle East during the course of his travels and amassed a comprehensive knowledge of the different ways of legal theory. He was a student of Mālik ibn Anas, the founder of the Mālikī school of law, and of Muḥammad Shaybānī, the Baghdad Ḥanafī intellectual.

- The Shafiʽi thoughts were initially spread by Al-Shafiʽi students in Cairo and Baghdad. By the 10th century, the holy cities of Mecca and Medina and Syria also became chief centres of Shafiʽi ideas.
- The school later exclusively held the judgeships in Syria, Kirman, Bukhara and the Khorasan. It also flourished in northern Mesopotamia and in Daylam. The Ghurids also endorsed the Shafiʽis in the 11th and 12th centuries AD.
- Under Salah al-Din, the Shafiʽi school again became the paramount thought in Egypt (the region had come under Shi'a influence prior to this period). It was the "official school" of the Ayyubid dynasty and remained prominent during Mamlūk period also. Baybars, the Mamlūk sultan, later appointed judges from all four madhabs in Egypt.
- Traders and merchants helped to spread Shafiʽi Islam across the Indian Ocean, as far India and the Southeast Asia.

=== Under Ottomans and the Safavids ===
- Rise of the Ottomans in the 16th century resulted in the replacement of Shafiʽi judges by Ḥanafī scholars.
- After the beginning of the Safavid rule, the presence of the Shafi's in Iran was limited to the western regions of the country.

== Distribution ==
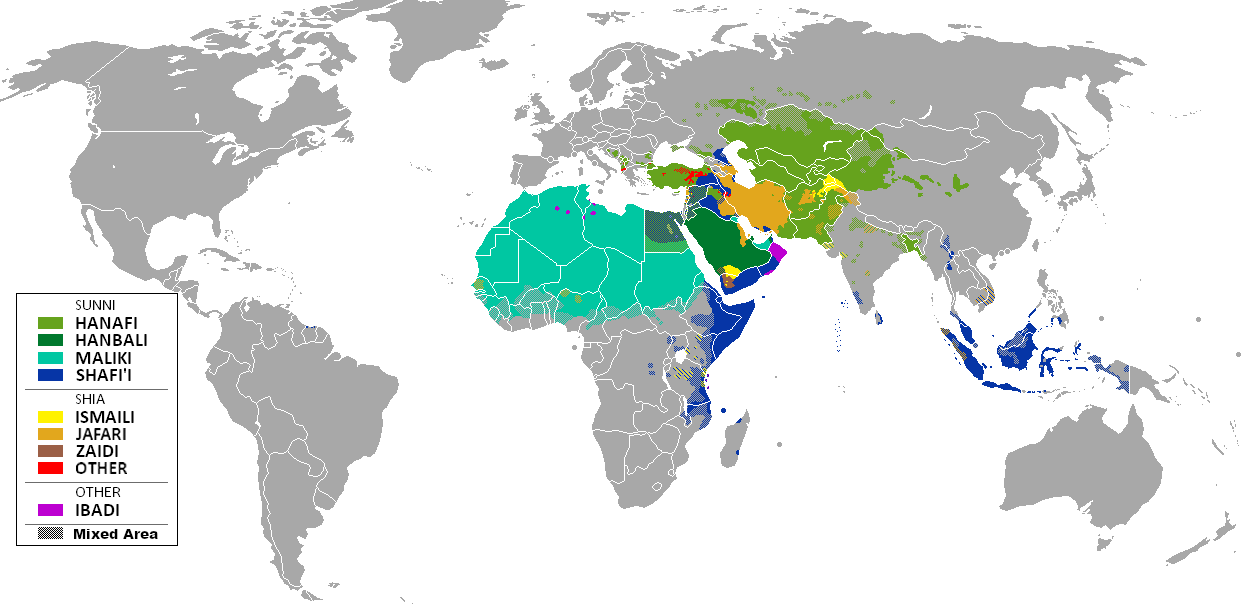
An approximate map showing the distribution of the Shafiʽi school (azure blue)

The Shafiʽi school is presently predominant in the Indian Ocean and the Horn of Africa in the countries of Djibouti, Ethiopia, Eritrea and Somalia while forming a minority in the Swahili Coast. (Note: "The law provides sanctions for any religious practice other than the Sunni Shafiʽi doctrine of Islam and for prosecution of converts from Islam, and bans proselytizing for any religion except Islam.") Traders and merchants helped to spread Shafiʽi Islam across the Indian Ocean. Within the Middle East, it is the majority school of the Kurdish Muslim population in the Levant and Iraq, as well as Lower Egypt and Yemen. The Shafi'i school is principal school of thought followed throughout Southeast Asia, in Indonesia, Malaysia and Singapore. Shafi'is form a plurality in coastal southern Indian states such as Kerala, Tamil Nadu and Karnataka and are half of the Muslim population in Sri Lanka and the Maldives alongside Hanafis.

The Shafiʽi school is the third-largest school of Sunni madhhabs by number of adherents, after Hanafi and Maliki. The demographic data for Shafi'ism is considered to be more than 350 million. It is one of two dominant schools of thought practiced among Muslims in the United States other than Hanafi.

== Notable Shafiʽis ==
- Al-Muzani (c.791-878)
- Al-Buwayti
- Ar-Rabi‘ ibn Sulayman al-Muradi
- Al-Ghazali (c.1058-1111)
- Yahya ibn Sharaf al-Nawawi (c.1230-1277)
- Fakhr al-Din al-Razi (c.1150-1209)
- Ibn al-Nafis (c.1213-1288)
- Ibn Kathir (c.1300-1373)
- Izz al-Din ibn 'Abd al-Salam (c.1182-1262)
- Ibn Daqiq al-'Id (c.1228-1302)
- Al-Suyuti (c.1445-1505)

In Hadith:

- Abu Zur'a al-Razi
- Abu Hatim al-Razi
- Ibn Khuzaymah
- Ibn Hibban
- Al-Khattabi
- Al-Daraqutni
- Hakim al-Nishaburi
- Abu Nu'aym al-Isfahani
- Al-Bayhaqi (c.994-1066)
- Al-Khatib al-Baghdadi
- Al-Baghawi
- Ibn Asakir
- Ibn al-Salah
- Ibn al-Najjar
- Al-Nawawi
- Al-Mizzi
- Al-Dhahabi (c.1274-1348)
- Taqi al-Din al-Subki
- Ibn Kathir (c.1300-1373)
- Ibn al-Mulaqqin
- Zain al-Din al-'Iraqi
- Ali ibn Abu Bakr al-Haythami
- Ibn Hajar al-Asqalani (c.1372-1449)
- Al-Sakhawi
- Al-Suyuti
- Al-Qastallani
- Ibn Hajar al-Haytami (c.1503-1566)
- Yasin al-Fadani
- Ibn al-Aquli

In Tafsir:

- Al-Tabari (c.839-923)
- Ahmad ibn Muhammad al-Tha'labi
- Al-Baghawi
- Fakhr al-Din al-Razi
- Ibn Kathir (c.1300-1373)
- Taqi al-Din al-Subki
- Al-Baydawi
- Al-Mahalli
- Al-Suyuti
- Said Nursî
- Hamka

In Fiqh:

- Al-Khattabi
- Al-Mawardi
- Abu Ishaq al-Shirazi
- Al-Juwayni
- Al-Ghazali
- Al-Baghawi
- Izz al-Din ibn 'Abd al-Salam
- Ibn al-Salah
- Al-Nawawi
- Taqi al-Din al-Subki
- Siraj al-Din al-Bulqini
- Ibn al-Mulaqqin
- Al-Baydawi
- Al-Mahalli
- Zakariyya al-Ansari
- Al-Suyuti
- Ibn Hajar al-Haytami
- Sayf al-Din al-Amidi
- Ahmad ibn Naqib al-Misri
- Zainuddin Makhdoom I
- Ibn Nuhaas
- Abdallah al-Qutbi
- Taj al-Din al-Subki

In Usul al-Fiqh:

- Abu Ishaq al-Shirazi
- Al-Juwayni
- Al-Ghazali
- Fakhr al-Din al-Razi
- Izz al-Din ibn 'Abd al-Salam
- Taqi al-Din al-Subki
- Al-Mahalli
- Al-Suyuti
- Taj al-Din al-Subki

In Arabic language studies:

- Ibn Malik
- Ibn Hisham
- Fairuzabadi
- Taqi al-Din al-Subki
- Al-Suyuti

In Theology:

- Ibn Kullab
- Abu al-Hasan al-Ash'ari
- Ibn Furak
- Abu Mansur al-Baghdadi
- Al-Bayhaqi
- Al-Juwayni
- Al-Ghazali
- Fakhr al-Din al-Razi
- Izz al-Din ibn 'Abd al-Salam
- Rashid Rida
- Taqi al-Din al-Subki

In Philosophy:

- Abd al-Jabbar ibn Ahmad
- Fazlur Rahman Malik
- Khaled Abou El Fadl

In Sufism

- Harith al-Muhasibi
- Abd al-Karīm ibn Hawāzin Qushayri
- Abu Talib al-Makki
- Imam al-Haddad
- Ahmad Ghazali (c.1061-1123)
- Ayn al-Quzat Hamadani
- Abu al-Najib Suhrawardi
- Shahab al-Din Suhrawardi
- Yusuf Hamdani
- Ahmed ar-Rifa'i
- Najm al-Din Kubra
- Shams Tabrizi
- Safi-ad-din Ardabili
- Kamal Khujandi
- Yusuf an-Nabhani
- Abd Al-Rahman bin Ahmad al-Zayla'i
- Uways al-Barawi
- Sa'eed ibn Isa Al-Amoudi

In history

- Al-Khatib al-Baghdadi
- Ibn 'Asakir
- Ali ibn al-Athir
- Ibn al-Najjar
- Ibn Khallikan
- Al-Dhahabi
- Taqi al-Din al-Nabhani
- Ahmad al-Hifzi

Statesmen

- Saladin
- Nizam al-Mulk

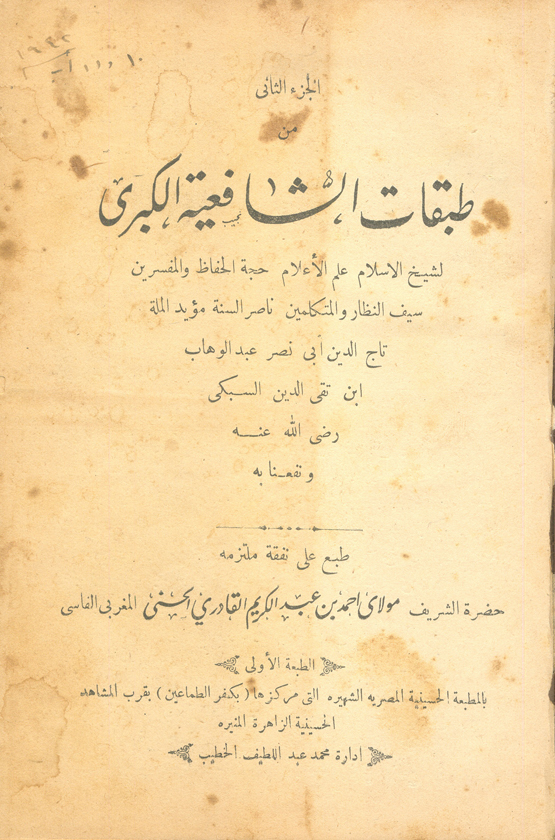
Book cover of Tabaqat al-Shafi'iyya al-Kubra by Shaykh al-Islam Taj al-Din al-Subki (d. 771/1370)

=== Contemporary Shafiʽi scholars ===
From Middle East and North Africa:

- Ali al-Qaradaghi
- Ahmed Kuftaro
- Ali Gomaa
- Habib Umar bin Hafiz
- Habib Umar al-Jilani
- Sa'id Foudah
- Abdullah al-Harari
- Ali al-Jifri
- Mohammad Salim Al-Awa
- Wahba Zuhayli
- Taha Jabir Alalwani
- Taha Karaan

From Southeast Asia:

- Afifi al-Akiti
- Ahmad Syafi'i Maarif
- Hasyim Muzadi
- Syed Muhammad Naquib al-Attas

From South Asia:

- Muhammad Jifri Muthukkoya Thangal
- Tajul Ulama
- K. Ali Kutty Musliyar
- Kanniyath Ahmed Musliyar
- E. K. Aboobacker Musliyar
- Zainuddin Makhdoom II
- Sheikh Abubakr Ahmad
- Cherussery Zainuddeen Musliyar
- Varakkal Mullakoya Thangal
- Shihabuddeen Ahmed Koya Shaliyathi

== See also ==
- Sunni Islam
- The four Sunni Imams
- Hanafi
- Maliki
- Hanbali
- Shia Islam
