= Baqiyat Salihat Arabic College =

Islamic college in Tamil Nadu, India

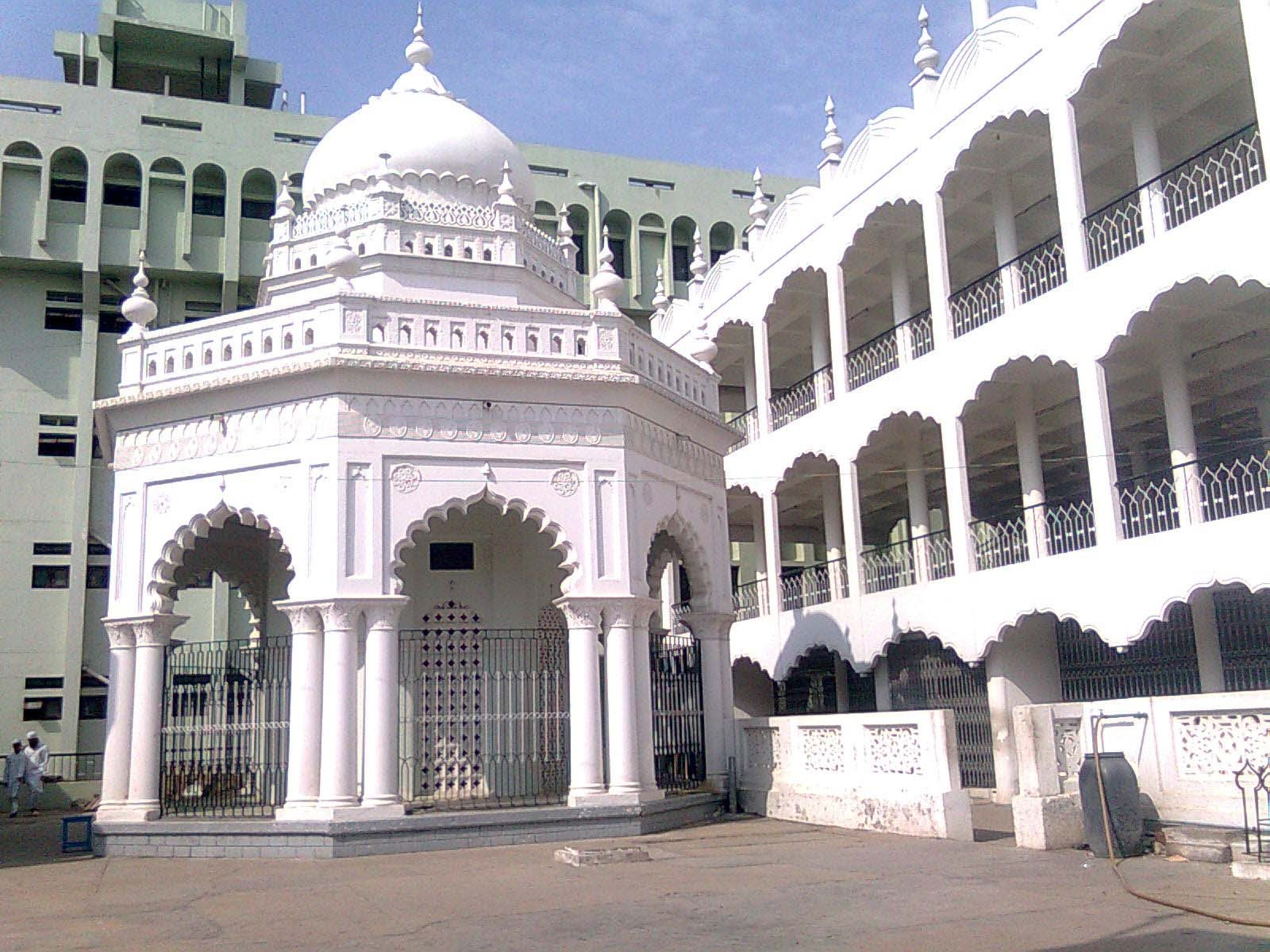
- Maqbara of A'la Hazrat Shah Abdul Wahhab
- Other name: BAKHIYATH
- Type: Islamic university
- Established: 1857
- Founder: Shah Abdul Wahhab
- President: .............
- Vice-president: A. Mohamed Ameen
- Principal: Abdul Hameed Bakavi
- Head: S. Ziauddin Ahmed
- Location: Madrasa Al-Bakhiyath us-Salihath Arabic College, Jayaram Chetty Street (Anjuman Street), Vellore, 632004., Vellore, Tamil Nadu, India; 12°55′11″N 79°08′08″E

Bakhiyath Salihath Arabic College (جامعة الباقيات الصالحات) or Jami'ah al Baqiyath as Salihat is an Islamic college in Vellore, Tamil Nadu, India established in 1857. The madrasa was founded by Aa'la Hazrat Abdul Wahhab. He was one of the students of Bahrul uloom Saahibul Karaamaat Ash Sheikh Meer Amjad Ibrahim Chinna Hazrat, the second of Madurai Maqbara hazrats in Madurai.

According to Viji and Yasir, "This Madrasa has acquired the status of a university. In view of pioneering role played by this institution in various foreign countries by teaching their citizens his seat of learning is rightly addressed as Islamic University and more appropriately as Umm ul_Madaris. Though the syllabus followed here is the universally recognized Nizamiah syllabus: it also provides exposure to English language as well as to Urdu (for non-Urdu speakers) keeping in view the demands of the time. This Madrasa has courses of graduation (Maulvi ‘Aalim) and post-graduation (Maulvi Fadhil) level. In addition, there are departments that offer specializations in Tasnif, Ta’lif, Tahqeeq and Tarjama (writing/editing/research and translation). Alumni of this institution have established haundreds of academic institutions not only within the country but also in alien lands. A few of them have acquired the status of universities."

The trust of the Madrasa played a vital role in forming the strong Islamic institution in South India.

== Prominent Alumni ==
The graduates of this Madarasa are known as Baqavi (Baqawi, Baquavi, Baqvi, Bakavi, Bakawi). This Madrasa had produced a good number of well-known Islamic Scholars. The graduated scholars are the pioneers of thousands of makatibs and madaris in throughout south India and far east countries.

The famous Tamil translation of Al-Quran by Moulana Abdul Hameed Baqavi was acknowledged by the eminent Muftis and Alims of south India.
