= List of Islamic universities and colleges in India =

This is a list of notable Islamic universities and colleges, and modern universities and institutes within the Muslim names in India.

== Islamic seminaries ==
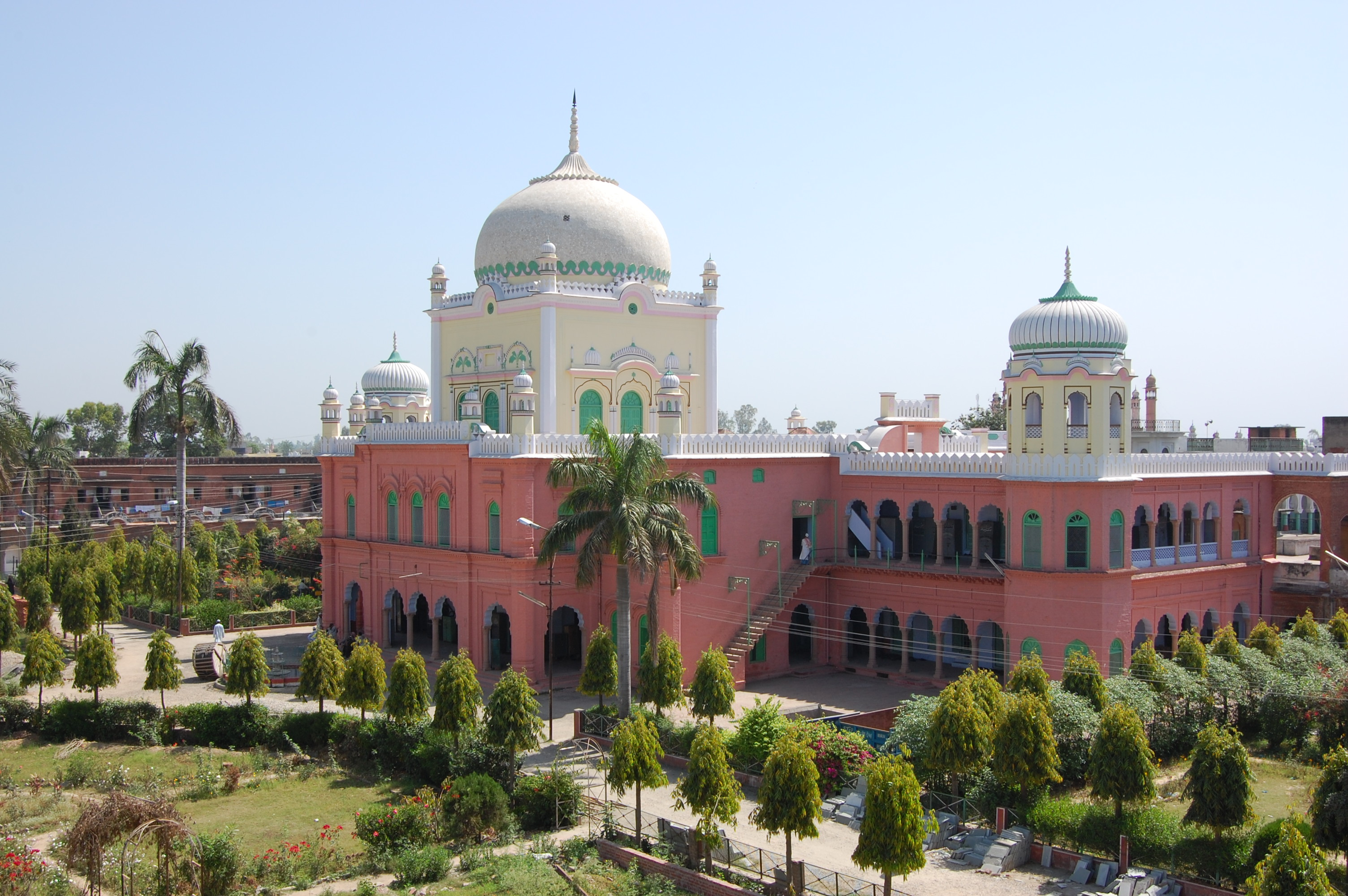
Darul Uloom Deoband.

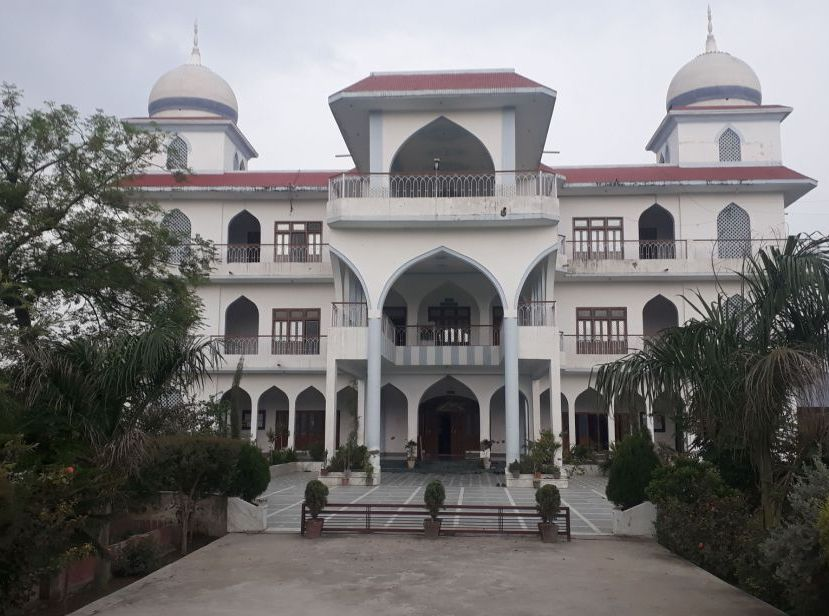
Academic block of Jamia Imam Muhammad Anwar Shah

- Al-Jame-atul-Islamia, Faizabad
- Al Jamiatul Ashrafia, Mubarakpur, Azamghar, Uttar Pradesh
- Aljamea-tus-Saifiyah, Surat and Mumbai.
- Arusiyyah Madrasah, Kilakarai, Tamil Nadu
- Baqiyat Salihat Arabic College, Vellore, Tamil Nadu
- Coordination of Islamic Colleges (WAFY) Malappuram, Kerala
- Darul Huda Islamic University, Chemmad, Kerala
- Darul Uloom Deoband
- Darul Uloom Nadwatul Ulama, Lucknow
- Darul Uloom Raheemiyyah, Bandipora, Kashmir
- Jamiatul Qasim Darul Uloom Al-Islamiah, Supaul
- Jamia Amjadia Rizvia, Ghosi, Uttar Pradesh
- Jamia Arifia, Saiyed Sarawan, Uttar Pradesh
- Jamia Darussalam, Oomerabad, Tamil Nadu
- Jamia Islamia Bhatkal, Bhatkal, Karnataka
- Jamia Markaz, Karanthoor, Kozhikkod
- Jamia Nizamia, Hyderabad, Telangana
- Jami'a Nooriyya Arabic College, Pattikkad, Perinthalmanna, Kerala
- Jamia Nusrathul Islam, Randathani, Kerala
- Jamiatur Raza, Bareilly, Uttar Pradesh
- Jamia Islamia Ishaatul Uloom, Akkalkuwa
- Jamia Qasmia Madrasa Shahi, Moradabad, Uttar Pradesh
- Jamiathul Hind Al Islamiyya, Calicut, Kerala
- Madin Academy, Malappuram
- Manzar-e-Islam, Bareilly, Uttar Pradesh
- Madrasa Aminia Islamia Arabia, Kashmiri Gate, Delhi
- Markazu Saquafathi Sunniyya, Kozhikode, Kerala
- Ma'din academy, Malappuram, Kerala
- Jamia Imam Muhammad Anwar Shah, Deoband, Uttar Pradesh
- Darul Uloom Banskandi, Banskandi, Cachar district, Assam
- Darul Uloom Mau, Mau, Uttar Pradesh
- Jamia Miftahul Uloom, Mau, Uttar Pradesh
- Rahmaniyya Arabic College, Katameri Kerala
- Jamea Tul Hidaya, Jaipur, Rajasthan

== Urdu universities ==
University	Status	State	Location	Established	Sources
Aliah University	Public State University	West Bengal	Kolkata	1780	
Dr. Abdul Haq Urdu University	Public State university	Andhra Pradesh	Kurnool	2016	
Maulana Azad National Urdu University	Central university	Telangana	Hyderabad	1998	

== Modern universities ==
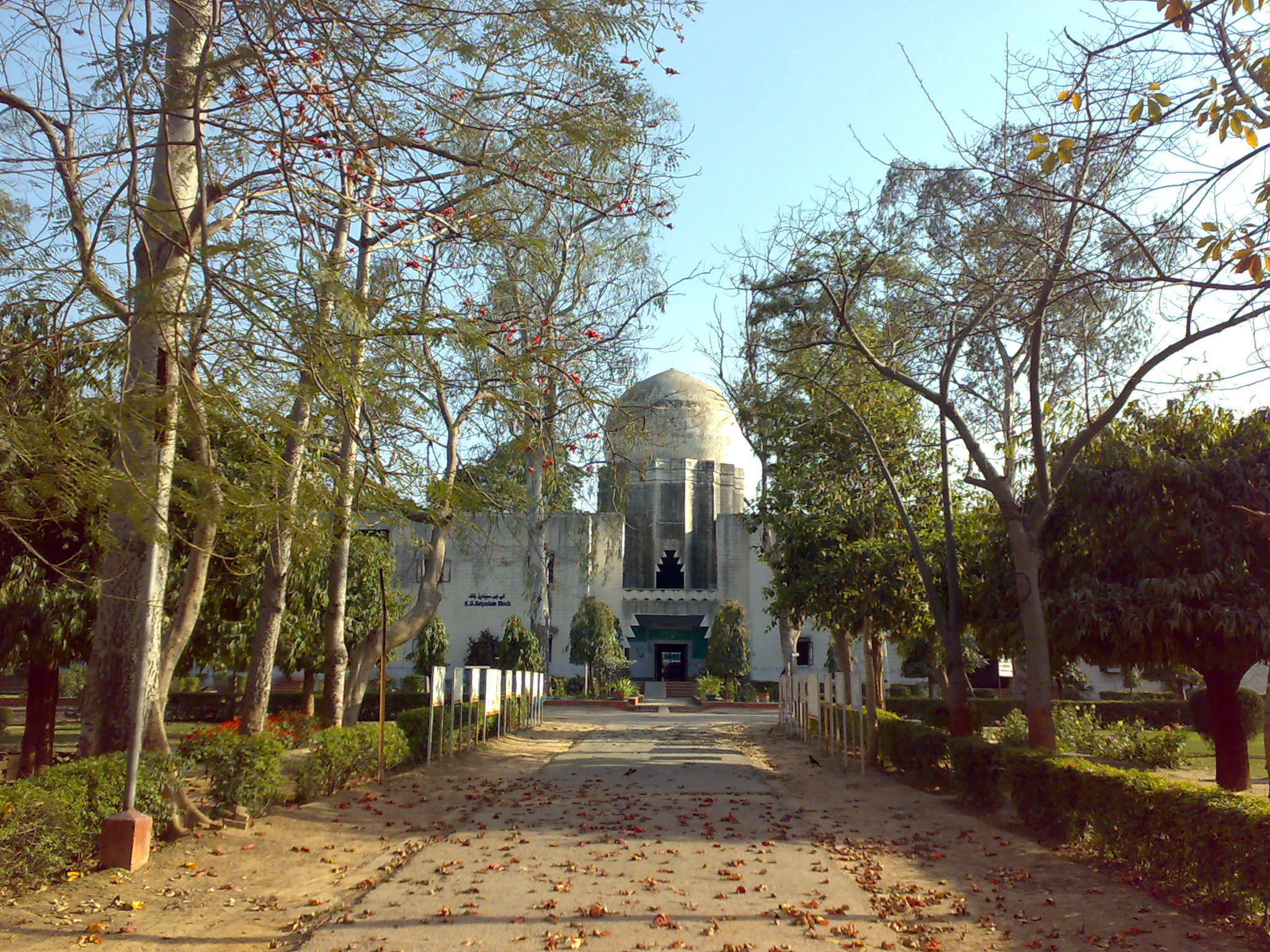
Faculty of Education, Jamia Millia Islamia

- Aliah University, Kolkata, West Bengal
- Aligarh Muslim University, Aligarh, Uttar Pradesh
- B.S. Abdur Rahman Crescent Institute of Science and Technology, Vandalur, Tamil Nadu
- Jamia Hamdard, New Delhi, Delhi
- Jamia Millia Islamia, New Delhi, Delhi
- Khwaja Moinuddin Chishti Language University, Lucknow, Uttar Pradesh
- Mohammad Ali Jauhar University, Rampur, Uttar Pradesh, Uttar Pradesh
- Integral University, Lucknow, Uttar Pradesh
- Maulana Mazharul Haque Arabic and Persian University, Patna, Bihar
- Al-Karim University, Katihar, Bihar
- Noorul Islam Centre for Higher Education, Kumarakovil
- Osmania University, Hyderabad, Telangana
- Islamic University of Science and Technology, Awantipora, Jammu and Kashmir
- Khaja Bandanawaz University, Kalaburagi, Karnataka
- Maulana Azad University, Jodhpur, Rajasthan
- Glocal University, Saharanpur

== Modern institutes ==
=== Andhra Pradesh ===
- Fathima Institute of Medical Sciences, Kadapa
- Nimra Institute of Medical Sciences

=== Bihar ===
- Millat College, Darbhanga
- Mirza Ghalib College, Gaya
- Maulana Azad College of Engineering and Technology, Patna
- Millia Institute of Technology, Purnea
- Mithila Minority Dental College and Hospital, Darbhanga
- Patna Muslim Science College, PATNA
- Madhubani Medical College and Hospital, Madhubani
- Katihar Medical College & Hospital, Katihar
- Sufia Unani Medical College and Hospital, Chakia, East Champaran
- Salfia Unani Medical College and Hospital, Darbhanga
- Nezamia Unani Medical College and Hospital, Gaya
- ZH Unani Medical College and Hospital, Siwan
- Siwan Engineering College, Siwan
- ZA Islamia PG College, Siwan
- Alay Fatima Hai College of Nursing, Patna

=== Jharkhand ===
- Karim City College, Jamshedpur
- Imamul Hai Khan Law College, Bokaro
- Sheikh B. Medical College, Hazaribagh
- Maulana Azad College, Ranchi
- Al-Iqra Teachers Training College, Dhanbad
- Momin College, Bokaro
- Abdul Bari Memorial College, Jamshedpur

=== Karnataka ===
- Al-Ameen Educational Society, Bangalore
- Khaja Bandanawaz University
- Yenepoya Medical College, Mangalore
- Kanachur Institute of Medical Sciences, Mangalore
- Anjuman Institute of Technology and Management
- HKBK College of Engineering, Bangalore
- Ghousia College of Engineering, Bangalore

=== Haryana ===
- Al-Falah University
- Mewat Engineering College(Waqf)
- Al Jamia Off Campus, Mewat

=== Kerala ===
- Jamia markaz, Kozhikode
- Markaz knowledge City, kaithappoyil, Kozhikode
- Darul Huda Islamic University
- Sidheeqiyya Da'wa College, Areekode,
- Coordination of Islamic Colleges
- Farook College, Kozhikode
- Ma'din Academy, Swalath Nagar
- Markaz Law College, Kozhikode, Kerala
- MEA Engineering College, Malappuram, Kerala
- Muslim Educational Society, Kerala
- Academy of Sharia and Advanced Studies
- Pocker Sahib Memorial Orphanage College, Tirurangadi
- Thangal Kunju Musaliar College of Engineering, Kollam
- Jamia Hikamiyya, Manjeri

=== Maharashtra ===
- Dr Rafiq zakariya campus Maulana Azad College of Arts and Science, Aurangabad
- JIIU's Indian Institute of Medical Sciences and Research Centre, Jalna
- Kalsekar Technical Campus, New Panvel
- Anjuman College Of Engineering & Technology, Nagpur. (MANAGED BY HAMI E ISLAM TRUST)
- Anjuman Girls Degree College, Nagpur.
- Anjuman Polytechnic Managed By Hami E Islam Nagpur.
- M. H. Saboo Siddik College of Engineering, Mumbai
- Mce society's Azam campus pune

=== Tamil Nadu ===
- Jamal Mohamed College, Tiruchirappalli
- MAM College of Engineering, Tiruchirappalli
- M.S.S. Wakf Board College, Madurai
- National College of Engineering, Tirunelveli
- The New College, Chennai
- C. Abdul Hakeem College, Melvisharam
- C. Abdul Hakeem College of Engineering & Technology, Melvisharam

=== Telangana ===
- Deccan College of Engineering and Technology
- Deccan College of Medical Sciences
- Lords Institute of Engineering & Technology, Hyderabad
- Muffakham Jah College of Engineering and Technology
- Shadan Institute of Medical Sciences, Hyderabad

=== Uttar Pradesh ===
- Halim Muslim PG College, Kanpur
- Karamat Husain Muslim Girls P. G. College, Lucknow
- Shia PG College, Lucknow
- Ibn Sina Academy of Medieval Medicine and Sciences, Aligarh
- Jamia Al Barkaat, Aligarh
- SKBM Degree College, Dildarnagar
- Shibli National College, Azamgarh, Azamgarh
- Asim Siddique Memorial Degree College, Budaun
- FH Medical College and Hospital, Agra Road
- Career Medical College and Hospital, Lucknow
- Era Medical College and Hospital, Lucknow
- Integral Institute of Medical Sciences, Lucknow
- Islamia Degree College, Deoband
