= Arabs in India =

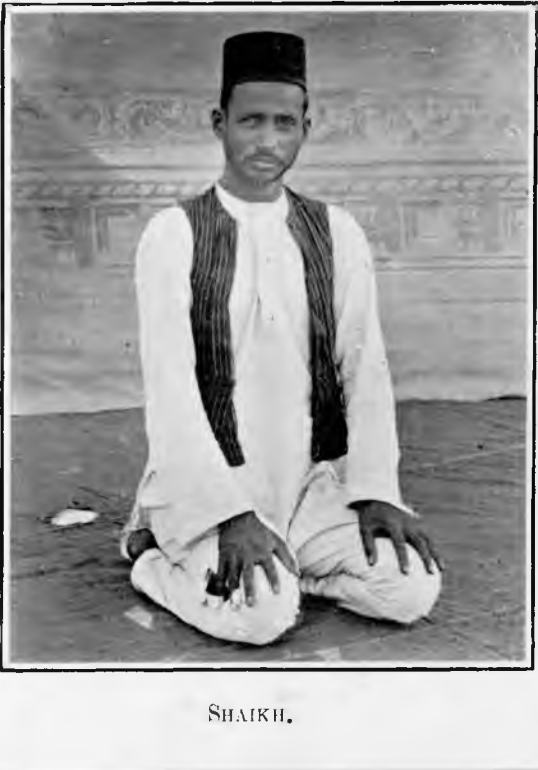

Total population
- 54,947 (Arabic speaking) large number of Indians with partial or full Arab ancestry

Regions with significant populations
- Kerala, Andhra Pradesh, West Bengal, Bihar, Telangana, Punjab, Gujarat, Madhya Pradesh, Sindh, Haryana, Maharashtra, Karnataka, Delhi, Rajasthan, Tamil Nadu

Languages
- Currently spoken: Various Indian languages and English; Traditional: Arabic

Religion
- Islam, Christianity

Arabs in India are people with Arab origins who have over a long period of time, settled in the Indian subcontinent. There have been extensive trade and cultural links between India and the Arab world spanning several millennia. The west coast region of India, especially Malabar, Gujarat and Konkan coasts were active trading hubs, where Arab merchants frequently used to visit on their way to Sri Lanka and Southeast Asia. Over a span of several centuries, migrants from different Arabian nations immigrated to various regions and kingdoms of the Indian subcontinent as merchants, missionaries and through intermarriages.

== Communities ==
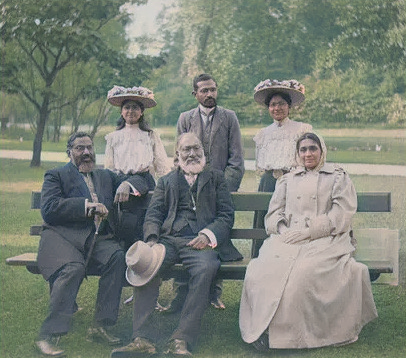
Tyabji family of North Yemeni origin

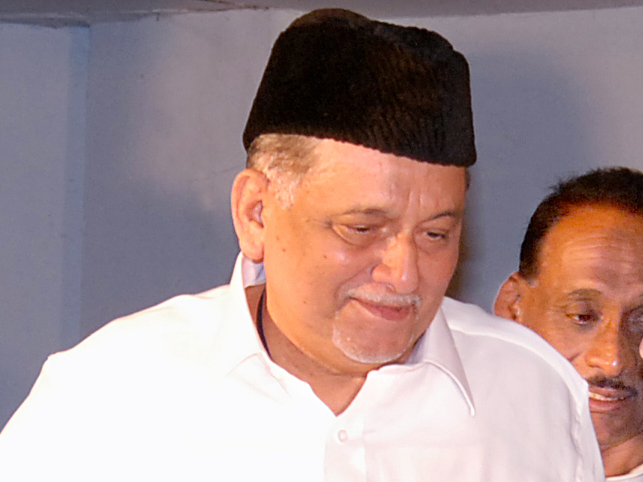
Sayed Muhammed Ali Shihab Thangal of the Pukkoya family of Panakkad, of Yemeni origin.

The earliest immigrants from the Arab world arrived as merchants to the Malabar coastal region of South West India, today consisting of the state of Kerala. Many of these Arab merchants married local women. Concentrations of these mixed-race descendants of Arab merchants can be found especially in the Kozhikode and Malappuram districts of Kerala. There also have been historic and close links between the Orthodox churches of South-West India and the Christian Arab orthodox churches in the middle east for several centuries, especially among the Orthodox Christians in India and Syria, which they maintain until this day and many of the Christians from these communities have claimed their ancestors are Arabs and the DNA results support this claim with Haplogroup G-M201 and Haplogroup J-M304 being prominent.

Descendants of Arabs also live in the villages of Variav and Rander in Gujarat. In Hyderabad, Chaush are an Arab community of Hadhrami descent whose ancestors were recruited as soldiers by Nizam of Hyderabad. Some Konkani Muslims trace their ancestry to traders from Hadhramaut (in Yemen or South Arabia). In coastal Karnataka, a group of Persian speaking Sunni Muslims from Iraq having Assadi surname arrived in Mangalore during the reign of Tipu Sultan. They claim their ancestry from Banu Assad. These population migrations may have been favoured by both the Nizam of Hyderabad and Tipu Sultan of Mysore because both had their ancestral linkages to these populations. In Kerala, Syed Thangals of Hadhrami descent settled around the 17th century as missionaries to propagate Islam.

There are also Shia Sayyids in the Northern region of the country who claim descent from Wasit, Iraq like Zaidis.

== Arab ancestry among Indians ==
It is estimated that several groups in India have Middle Eastern ancestry, including Arab ancestry. Certain Muslim groups, like the Dawood Bohra, and various populations in western India have at least some Middle Eastern ancestry. Genetic analyses show that West Asian lineages could be detected at varying degrees among Indians. Although West Asian gene flow into the Subcontinent was not recent, as it occurred primarily during the Mesolithic period(Iranian hunter gatherer migration into the Indus Valley).

Arabic speakers in India
Year	Pop.	±%
1971	23,318	—
1981	28,116	+20.6%
1991	21,975	−21.8%
2001	51,728	+135.4%
2011	54,947	+6.2%
Source: Language Census of India (2011)

== See also ==
- India–Saudi Arabia relations
- India–United Arab Emirates relations
- Arab diaspora
- Adnani Arabs
- Chaush (India)
