= Coordination of Islamic Colleges =

Non-state academic governing body in India

- Abbreviation: CIC or C. I. C.
- Formation: 2000
- Type: Academic Body
- Headquarters: Wafa Campus, Malappuram District
- Location: India
- Region served: Kerala
- Official language: English; Arabic
- General Secretary: Abdul Hakeem Faizy
- President: Sayyid Sadiq Ali Shihab Thangal
- Website: www.wafycic.com

Coordination of Islamic Colleges (CIC), based in Kerala, India, is an Islamic university serving as an academic administrative body. Colleges affiliated with the CIC offer "Wafy" courses for men and "Wafiyya" for women, which combine both Islamic and secular higher education (post-secondary school, leading to a state-recognised university degree). These courses were designed and developed by Abdul Hakeem Faizy, an Islamic scholar and educationalist, who currently serves as the General Secretary of the CIC and is an executive board member from India at the League of Islamic Universities based in Cairo. Panakkad Sayyid Sadiq Ali Shihab Thangal is the current President of the CIC. At present, there are around 100 institutes affiliated to the CIC in Kerala. The CIC was established in Malappuram District in 2000 and was associated with the Samastha Kerala Jem-iyyathul Ulama, principal Sunni-Shafi'i scholarly council, in Kerala.

The body had signed memoranda of understandings with University of Cairo, League of Islamic Universities, Cairo, Arab League Educational, Cultural and Scientific Organization, Academy of Arabic Language, Cairo and the Egyptian Government's Ministry of Religious Affairs. The body notably promotes the concept of women-only educational institutes of higher religious learning in Kerala, where women are simultaneously trained in advanced Islamic theology and modern secular education up to the graduate level.

== History ==
The CIC made a humble beginning in the year 2000 as an academic coordinating committee of a few Islamic colleges following a standardised curriculum and academic programmes. A precursor of this journey had started in mid 1990s at K.K.H.M. Islamic and Arts College, under Markazu Tharbiyathil Islamiyya, in Karthala of Malappuram District. Later, the CIC came into existence as an academic confederation of the various colleges who had shown interest in this programme and courses of study. The coordination has grown exponentially over a short span of time and became an academic umbrella of 90 colleges.

Registered as an autonomous organisation under the Societies Registration Act XXI of 1860 (Regi. No: 379/04), the CIC has grown to become a multi-layered organisation, with a senate, a syndicate, an advisory board and various sub-committees such as Academic Council, Examination Board and finance committee, directives of which are binding on each affiliated college. At present, Wafiyya Campus, Pang is the headquarters of the CIC.

Wafy is a modified and upgraded version of Al Muthavval course, a part of the erstwhile Nizamiyya Syllabus which had been adopted by most of the traditional Islamic colleges and seminaries in India for centuries. While retaining the spirit of the traditional syllabus intact, modification was achieved by introducing new topics and updating some traditional subjects. These measures were introduced to meet the new challenges and needs of time.

== Campuses ==
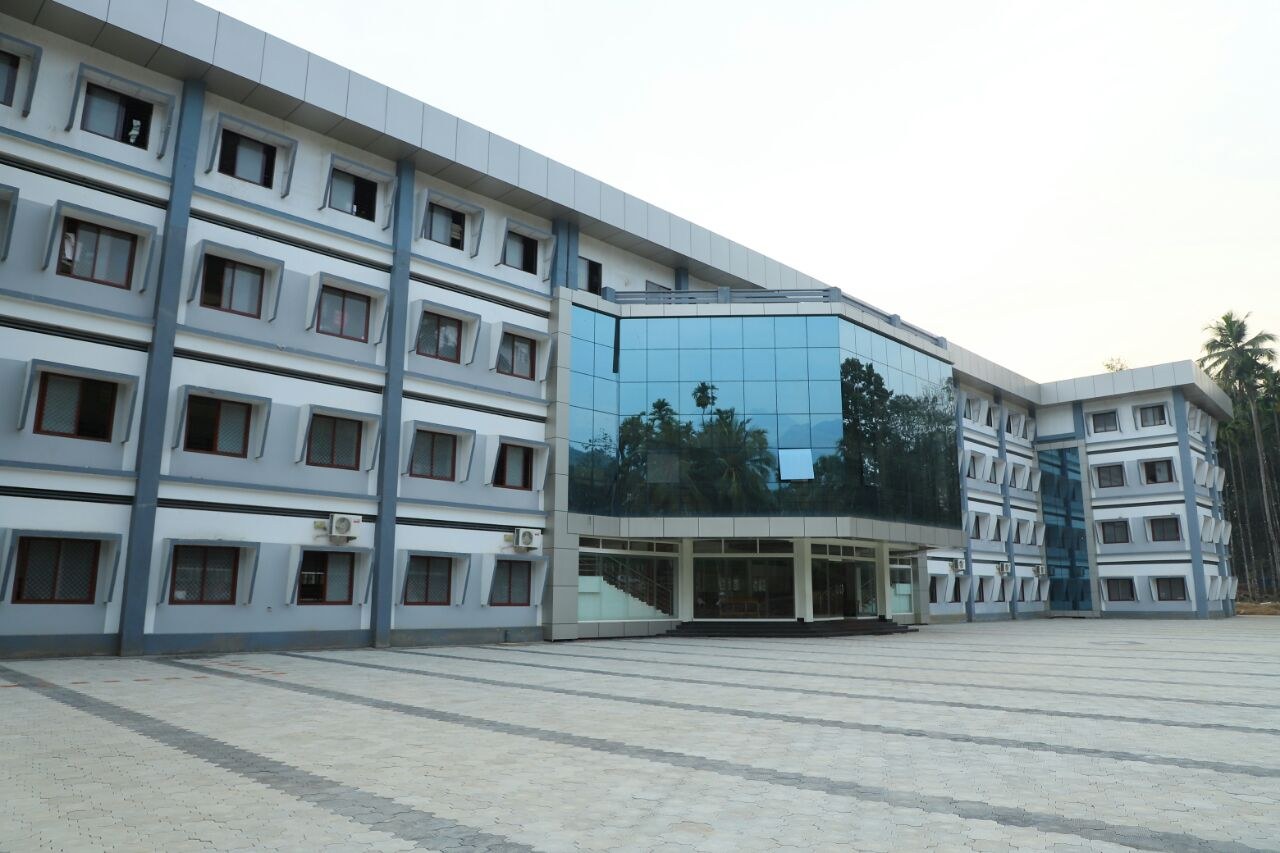
Wafy Campus Kalikavu, The Postgraduate Campus of CIC at Kalikavu in the Malappuram District, Kerala.

The CIC is currently headquartered at the 'Wafa Campus' at Pang in Malappuram District.

CIC operates two postgraduate campuses, the Wafy postgraduate campus at Kalikavu in Malappuram District and Malik Deenar Wafy postgraduate campus at Thiruvallur in Kozhikkode District.

The Wafy postgraduate campus in Kalikavu launched its first phase in 2016 by opening the academic block.

== Governance and coordination ==
The CIC leadership has the following positions and personnel:

- President – Sayyid Sadiq Ali Shihab Thangal
- General Secretary – Abdul Hakeem Faizy
- Treasurer – Ali Faizy Thootha
- Vice presidents
  - K. A. Rahman Faizy Kavanur
  - Muhammed Musliyar Chelakkad
  - Ahmed Mulsiyar Maniyoor
  - Hamza Musliyar Wayanad

=== Agreements ===
The CIC has entered into academic and cultural collaboration, and signed memoranda of understandings to this effect, with several globally renowned institutions such as:

- Al Azhar University, Cairo
- University of Cairo
- Arab League Educational, Cultural and Scientific Organization
- Islamic World Educational, Scientific and Cultural Organization
- Aligarh Muslim University
- Hamdard University, Pakistan
- Academy of Arabic Language, Cairo
- Ministry of Religious Affairs, Egypt
- National Council for Promotion of Urdu Language (NCPUL) of the Central Government of India

=== Recognition ===
The CIC has been recognised or honoured with:

- Membership at the executive committee of the League of Islamic Universities (Cairo)
- ISO 9001: 2015 certification
- Membership at the General Secretariat of the World Muslim Communities Council (Abu Dhabi, United Arab Emirates)
- Membership at the board of directors of the International Association of the Institutions Teaching Arabic Language for Non – Arabic Speakers (Islamic Educational, Scientific and Cultural Organisation-Morocco)
- Islamonline International education Award (2009)
- Islam.net Award (2011)

== Courses ==
The CIC regulated integrated courses for men and women combining Islamic and secular higher education. Known as "Wafy" and "Wafiyya", these courses are currently offered in different modes such as Residential, Day-school and Distance.

=== Wafy ===
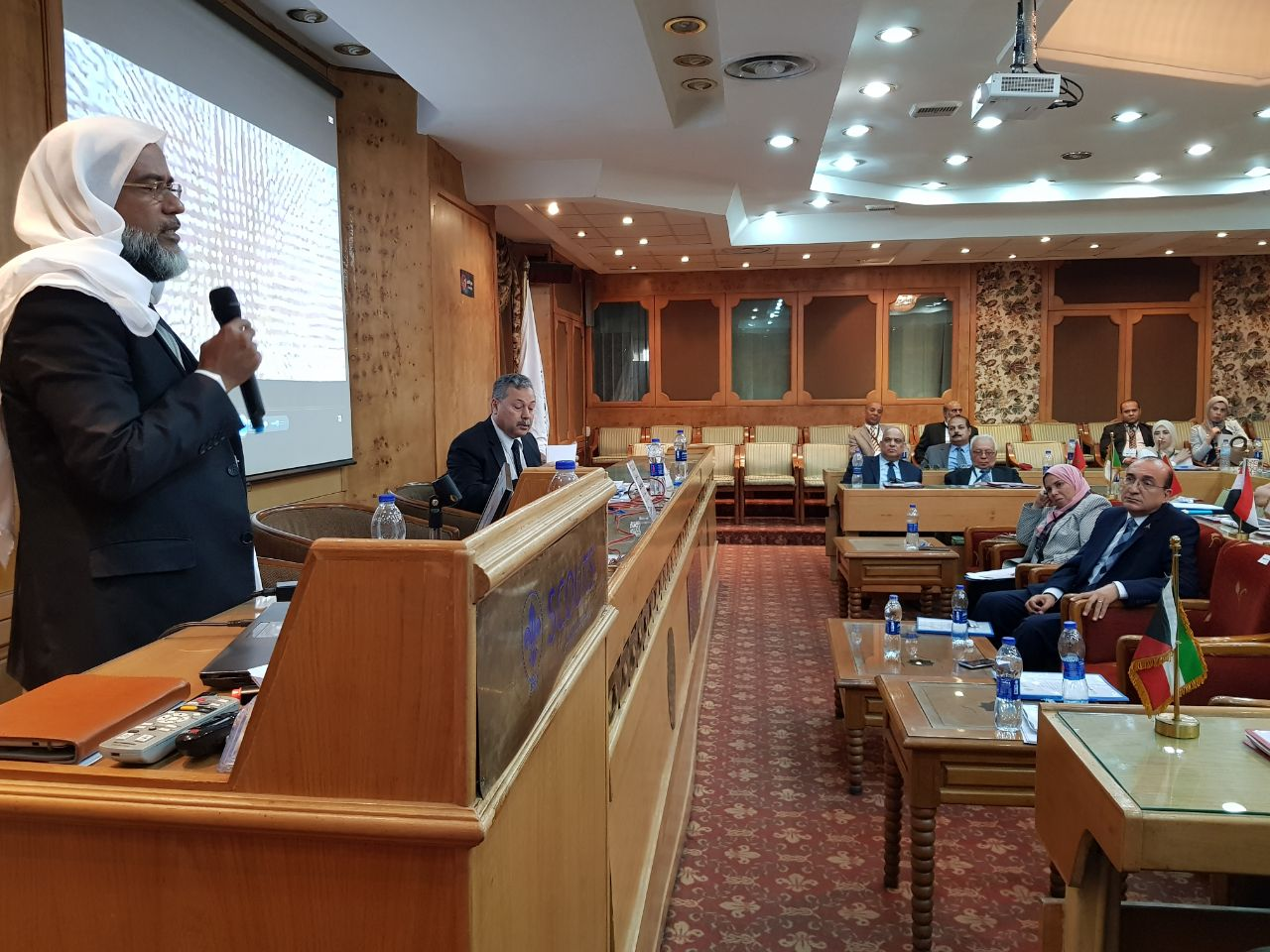
Abdul Hakeem Faizy, General Secretary CIC, attending a workshop in Cairo (2018).

Wafy is an eight-year programme in advanced Islamic studies (comprising two-year Higher Secondary, four-year undergraduate and two-year postgraduate courses) coupled with a recognised state university degree in a secular discipline. This course is offered in residential mode only and is exclusive for men.

The postgraduate programme consists of six departments under three faculties namely Theology, Islamic Sharīʿah and Arabic language and Islamic culture.

=== Wafy Arts ===
"Wafy Arts" is a five-year integrated programme comprising a two-year Higher Secondary and a three-year undergraduate studies with a state university degree in a secular discipline coupled with a preparatory certificate and a degree in Islamic Studies offered by the CIC This course is exclusive to men and is offered both in residential and day-school modes.

=== Wafiyya ===
Wafiyya is a five-year course in Islamic studies (comprising two-year higher secondary and three-year undergraduate courses) coupled with a recognised state university degree in a secular discipline. This course is offered in residential mode only and is exclusively for women.

An optional two-year postgraduate programme is also on offer for Wafiyya undergraduates, which they can complete either in distance or regular mode, subject to conditions.

=== Wafiyya Day ===
"Wafiyya Day" is a five-year course in advanced Islamic studies (comprising two-year higher secondary and three-year undergraduate courses) coupled with a recognised state university degree in a secular discipline. This course is offered in day-school mode and is exclusive for women.

== Educational approaches ==
=== Continuous assessment ===
To ensure the efficiency of the curriculum, the programmes are designed with various continuous evaluation activities such as seminars, debates, collections (portfolio of works), projects, symposiums, album setting, teaching practices, oral exams, essay writing, and field work. Continuous assessment constitutes around 20 per cent of the total marks in some subjects.

=== Orientation and workshops ===
The CIC conducts orientation and workshops for students and parents. The workshops include Da'wa workshops, field work, teaching practice sessions, pre- and post-marital counselling training, and de-addiction counselling training.

=== Academic events ===
The CIC conducts many academic events. Recently conducted international conferences and fiqh seminars have received considerable media attention. Wafy and Wafiyya alumni associations and students' federations regularly conduct academic programmes and training workshops.

As part of the syllabus at the postgraduate level, Wafy and Wafiyya students need to organise seminars and debates on different topics. The Examination Board grants grace marks to those attending and presenting papers at national and international level academic events.

=== Madrasathul Umm ===
Madrasathul Umm (which literally means 'Mother's School') is an exclusive curriculum designed by the CIC to nurture the Arabic language skills of the students, placing more emphasis on Listening, Speaking, Reading and Writing (LSRW).

=== Dissertation ===
During the period of postgraduate courses, students are required to submit a dissertation in not less than 100 pages on a selected topic approved by the academic council of the CIC. Later, they will be asked to defend and discuss their thesis in a viva voce in front of a select panel of experts from the faculty.

== Pastoral ==
=== Mentoring ===
The CIC has put in place an effective mentoring system. Students are assisted by full-time mentors who provide them with customised psychological care and guidance.

The CIC conducts training and workshops for mentors. It also conducts inspections from time to time to ensure mentoring is done efficiently.

=== Social service scheme ===
The CIC accords top priority to inculcate in students the habit of voluntary services. It has made social service mandatory for all students, aimed at nurturing in them the habit of serving the society and working for the needy and the underprivileged in the society.

Students must complete 192 hours of social service during their degree (Aliya) period. They have to complete 24 hours in each of the eight semesters at Aliya level. Students will receive certificates after their works being reviewed by the guides of their respective institutions and the CIC's CSS Coordinator.

The CIC was the first Islamic institute to introduce compulsory social service as a part of its curriculum. The first project was announced by the former Vice Chancellor of Calicut University K. K. N. Kurup at a meeting held at Shamsul Ulama Academy Wafy College, Vengapally, Wayanad on 18 November 2012.

The activities done by students under the CSS scheme include home building, flood volunteering, Mahal survey, Mahal empowerment, renovation of public libraries, cleaning work of government hospitals and local bodies, volunteering in programmes conducted by the Samastha Kerala Jam'iyyathul Ulama and its sub bodies, blood donation camps, medical camps, religious studies classes, Palliative care, Da'wa activities and relief activities. The Rescue Force formed by the Wafy Students' Federation during the Kerala flood have done some commendable jobs for two consecutive years. Over 400 students had worked in the 2019 flood alone.

== Workshops and training sessions ==
=== Leadership conclave ===
WSF has organised a Leadership Conclave under the theme "Learn to Lead, Lead to Success". The conclave was aimed at providing organisational training for the union leaders from different colleges.

=== Vagmeeyam: Speech Designing ===
The Wafy Students Federation Fine Arts Committee conducts public speaking training sessions called Vagmeeyam. A series of workshops led by various trainers for selected students from Wafy colleges, Vagmeeyam aims to develop the public speaking skills of the students.

== Student life ==
=== Student organisations ===
The student representative and networking organisations are: the Wafy Students Federation (WSF); Wafiyya Students Federation (WSF); and Orbit

Wafy Students Federation (WSF) is the student wing of CIC, representing all the students from 90 colleges owned by or affiliated to CIC.

The federation is actively involved in conducting various programmes and social projects. It coordinates curricular and non-curricular activities of the students from all affiliated colleges. Some of the focus areas of its operations include empowering the students, developing their organisational and leadership skills and leveraging their creative potential for various vital social projects.

Wafiyya Students Federation (WSF) is a state-wide association of students from Wafiyya institutions under the CIC. The organisation, founded in 2011 and headquartered at Markazu Tharbiyyathil Islamiyya, Valanchery, has conducted a number of significant activities in the field of art and culture. The main purpose of the organisation is to consolidate and nurture the extracurricular activities of the students. To this end, the organisation has held various state-level art fests and competitions.

Wafy Orbit is an extensive, bottom-up networking system connecting Wafy and Wafiyya students across the state. With committees at Panchayat, Taluk, constituency and district levels, it helps the students reach out to the general public to disseminate CIC's message and conduct various community development programmes.

=== Cultural and sporting events ===
- Wafy Arts Fest: The 11th State Wafy Arts Fest was held at Mundayad indoor stadium, Kannur on 20 January 2019.
- Wafiyya Arts Fest: brings together talented students from all Wafiyy college to compete at a state-level event. The state-level event is preceded by various zonal arts fests. The 7th State Wafiyya Arts Fest was held on 9 February 2019, at Markazu Tharbiyyathil Islamiyya Valanchery.
- Wafy Sports Meet: The WSF conducts an intercollege state-level sports meet, bringing together sporting talents from all Wafy colleges. The event is preceded by various college-level meets. The Third State Wafy Sports Meet, held at the Calicut University Synthetic Track, was attended by around 1500 athletes in 31 events.

=== Facilities ===
- Library: Extensive libraries with a large collection of books, reference books, children's literature in Arabic, English, Malayalam and Urdu, extracts related to syllabus, commentaries and tools. (The number of books to be in the preparatory, degree and postgraduate levels has been determined)
- Reading Room: Reading rooms with Malayalam, English, Arabic and Urdu newspapers, magazines, publications and other modern learning facilities.
- Auditorium and Smart Classroom: Auditoriums and smart classrooms with modern facilities for organizing public events, general classes, debates and training classes.

=== Co-curricular activities ===
Various educational and intellectual sessions and cultural programmes are organised at regular intervals and on official days such as Independence and Republic Days. Eminent scholars, doctors, legal and political experts, writers, military officials and personality developers are invited to the colleges to interact with the students. The extracurricular activities in the colleges also include various programmes in Arabic, English, Urdu and Malayalam languages.

In addition, students are given special training in various presentation skills such as elocution, debates, seminars, table talks, discussions, mock parliaments etc. Moreover, there are magazines (both manuscript and printed), tabloids, bulletins, pamphlets, wall journals, souvenirs and research magazines to improve the writing skills of the students.

== Controversy with Samastha Kerala ==
Tensions between the CIC and the Samastha Kerala Jem-iyyathul Ulama escalated over the CIC's constitutional amendment, Faizy's attempt to standardise the dars curriculum, and the Wafiyya marriage policy. In November 2022, Samastha formally expelled Faizy, citing anti-organisational activities. In February 2023, Samastha withheld cooperation with the CIC pending Faizy's removal as General Secretary. Faizy denied the allegations and said he would "focus on the future." Students and parents protested against proposals to discontinue the Wafy and Wafiyya courses.

== Key people ==
=== Hakeem Faizy Adrisseri ===
Abdul Hakeem Faizy Adrisseri
- അബ്ദുൽ ഹക്കീം ഫൈസി ആദൃശ്ശേരി
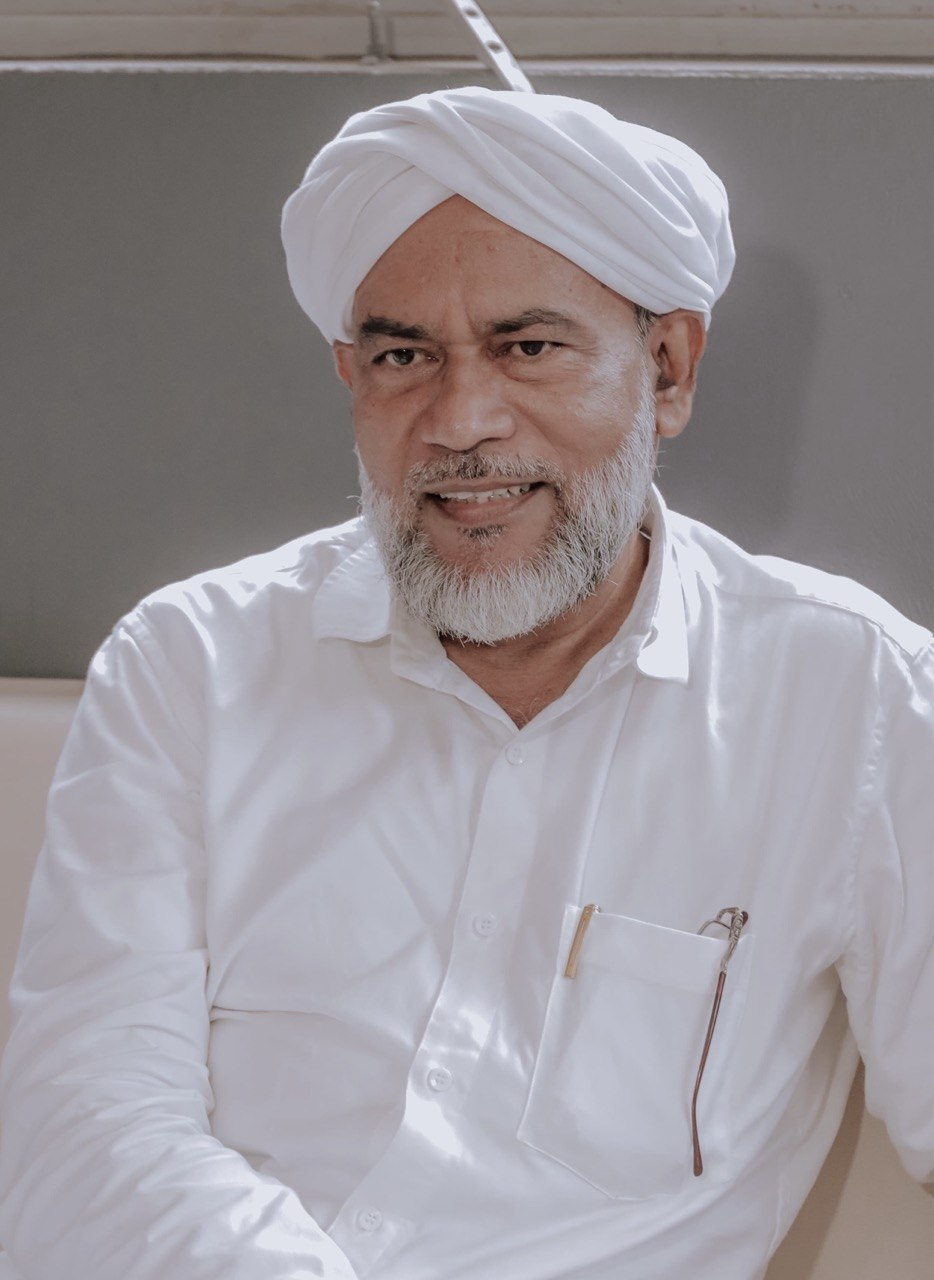
- Abdul Hakeem Faizy Adrisseri in Kerala, India
- Born: c. 1958; Adrisseri, Malappuram district, Kerala, India
- Citizenship: Indian
- Occupations: Islamic scholar, educationist
- Organisation: Coordination of Islamic Colleges
- Known for: Wafy and Wafiyya integrated curricula; pioneer of women-only Islamic seminaries in Kerala
- Awards: IOL Star of the Year (2009); OnIslam Muslim Star of the Year (2011); Azhari Thangal Excellence Award (2022)

Abdul Hakeem Faizy Adrisseri (Malayalam: അബ്ദുൽ ഹക്കീം ഫൈസി ആദൃശ്ശേരി; Arabic: عبد الحكيم الفيضي;) is an Indian Islamic scholar, and educationist from Malappuram district, Kerala, best known as General Secretary of the CIC. He is the chief architect of the Wafy and Wafiyya integrated academic programmes combining advanced Islamic studies with state-university secular degrees and the pioneer of women-only Islamic higher education seminaries in Kerala. In January 2018, he became the first Indian to be appointed to the 21-member Executive Board of the Cairo-based League of Islamic Universities (LIU). He also serves as India's representative at the General Secretariat of the World Muslim Communities Council in Abu Dhabi. In late 2022 he attracted national and international media attention when he was expelled from the Samastha Kerala Jem-iyyathul Ulama following a dispute over his reformist educational programme.

Faizy advocates for a synthesis of Islamic and secular knowledge, arguing that seminary graduates must understand "the scientific, cultural, political and intellectual currents that shape our modern world." On women's education, he has stated that "there is no better way of empowering Muslim women than to educate them and give them access to all streams of knowledge." He is an advocate of interfaith dialogue and religious pluralism, having organised international conferences on multiculturalism in Kerala.

==== Early life and education ====
Abdul Hakeem Faizy was born around 1958 in Adrisseri, Malappuram district, Kerala. He was raised in a clerical family and left formal school in the first standard, pursuing traditional dars education for approximately eight years. In 1977, he enrolled at Jamia Nooriya Arabic College, Pattikkad, Malappuram, for a two-year religious studies course, subsequently graduating from a seminary affiliated with the Samastha Kerala Jem-iyyathul Ulama.

==== Career ====
After his religious studies, Faizy served as an Imam in Abu Dhabi, UAE, for approximately a decade.

In the mid-1990s, Faizy returned to Kerala and took charge of Markazu Tharbiyyathil Islamiyya at Valanchery, Malappuram, where he developed an integrated, multidisciplinary curriculum combining classical Islamic learning with modern secular disciplines including comparative religious studies, modern research methodology, and English language.

In 2000, Faizy co-founded the CIC, registered under the Societies Registration Act XXI of 1860, as an academic confederation initially associated with the Samastha Kerala Jem-iyyathul Ulama. The CIC grew to encompass over 90 affiliated colleges, including nearly 40 all-women institutions. It has signed memoranda of understanding with the University of Cairo, Al-Azhar University, League of Islamic Universities, and Academy of the Arabic Language in Cairo.

Faizy played a leading role in developing the Wafy (for men) and Wafiyya (for women) integrated programmes, successors to the Al-Muthawwal course of the traditional Nizamiyya syllabus. Wafy is an eight-year programme combining two-year Higher Secondary, four-year undergraduate, and two-year postgraduate Islamic studies with a state-recognised secular university degree. Wafiyya is a five-year integrated undergraduate programme for women, combining advanced Islamic theology with a Bachelor's degree from a recognised university.

The first women-only Wafiyya seminary was established at Valanchery in 2008. By 2018, over 1,300 female students were enrolled across 24 Wafiyya colleges in Kerala. Graduates earn the title al-Wafiyya ("the committed women"). The initiative received international coverage from Qantara.de, Study International, and the Saudi Gazette.

In January 2018, Faizy was appointed to the 21-member Executive Board of the League of Islamic Universities, the first Indian to hold such a position. He attended the Fourth Executive Conference and Tenth General Assembly of the LIU in Alexandria, April 2018.

Faizy serves as India's representative at the General Secretariat of the World Muslim Communities Council in Abu Dhabi.

== See also ==
- Sayyid Sadiq Ali Shihab Thangal
