= Syed Mueen Ali Shaihab Thangal =

Syed Mueen Ali Shihab Thangal is a member of the Pukkoya Tangal family and the national vice president of the Muslim Youth League. He is the son of former Indian Union Muslim League State president Panakkad Sayed Hyderali Shihab Thangal.
