= Sayed Abbas Ali Shihab Thangal =

Indian community leader (born 1971)

Abbas Ali Shihab Thangal
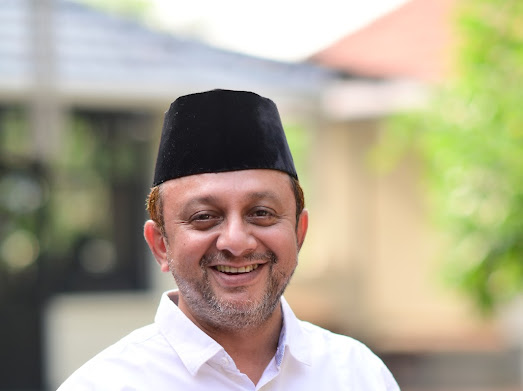
- Portrait of Sayed Abbas Ali Shihab Thangal

Indian Union Muslim League
- Incumbent
- Assumed office 2024

President of Samastha Kerala Sunni Students Federation
- In office 2010–2015

Malappuram District President, Indian Union Muslim League
- Incumbent
- Assumed office 2022

Personal details
- Born: Syed Abbas Ali Shihab; 31 May 1971 (age 55)
- Relations: Sayyid Muhammadali Shihab Thangal (brother); Sayyid Umerali Shihab Thangal (brother); Sayyid Hyderali Shihab Thangal (brother); Syed Sadiq Ali Shihab Thangal (brother)
- Parent: P. M. S. A. Pookkoya Thangal (father)
- Occupation: Community leader; Islamic scholar

Abbas Ali Shihab Thangal also known as Panakkad Sayed Abbas Ali Shihab Thangal (born 31 May 1971) is a Sayyid (known with the honorific prefix Sayed), (thangal) community leader from Kerala, India. He is the youngest son of Sayed Pookoya thangal, Panakkad. He is National Political Advisory Committee, Indian Union Muslim League, He holds various significant positions including Malappuram District President of Indian Union Muslim League (IUML). He former president of Samastha Kerala Sunni Students Federation (SKSSF) which is the students wing of Samastha Kerala Jamiyyathul Ulama.

== Family ==
Sayed Abbas Ali Shihab Thangal is a member of the PMSA Pukkoya Thangal family of Panakkad (north Kerala). He is the son of the late P. M. S. A. Pookkoya Thangal (1913 – 1975) and the brother of the late Sayed Mohammed Ali Shihab Thangal and the late Sayed Umer Ali Shihab Thangal late Sayed Hyder Ali Shihab Thangal and Sayed Sadiq Ali Shihab Thangal

== Public life ==
Sayed Abbas Ali Shihab Thangal was the president of Samastha Kerala Sunni Students Federation (S.K.S. S. F.), the student wing of Samastha Kerala Jam'iyyat al-'Ulama', and he is acknowledged for his contributions to Kerala's socio-religious landscape. His understanding of Islamic principles and commitment to fostering communal harmony have garnered recognition among the Muslim community. His efforts in education, social welfare, and interfaith dialogue have played a role in societal development in Kerala
