= Shihab Thangal Charity Trust =

- Abbreviation: STCT
- Founded: 2015
- Founder: Sayed Hyderali Shihab Thangal, P. K. Kunhalikutty, Sayyid Sadiq Ali Shihab Thangal
- Type: Non-governmental organization, Indian Trusts Act 1882
- Purpose: Education, Healthcare, Poverty Reduction
- Location: Calicut, India
- Region served: India
- Method: Community Mobilization, Empowerment, Capacity Building, Service Delivery
- Key people: Munavvar Ali Shihab Thangal, Chairperson
- Website: www.stctrust.org

The Shihab Thangal Charity Trust (abbr. STCT) is a registered non-profit institution which was established in 2015 by the Indian Union Muslim League.

== History ==
Shihab Thangal Charitable Trust is a non-profit organization that was registered in 2015 in India, named for Syed Muhammedali Shihab Thangal.

== Charity projects ==
- Palliative care
- Physiotherapy & Rehabitation Centre
- Hospital- Shihab Thangal Hospital

== Board of trustees ==
The board of trustees as well as the management of the Thangal Charitable is heavily influenced by the Indian Union Muslim League.

=== Board of trustees ===
Post in the Trust	Trustees
Chairperson	Munavvar Ali Shihab Thangal
Business Executive	Abdul Waheed
Trustee	Amjad Khan
	Muhammed Shakkeer
