= Kolmanna =

Village in Kerala, India

Kolmanna river during rainy season

Kolmanna Kadavu

== Geography ==
Kolmanna is a village in emerging Malappuram city of Kerala state. The area of the village 0.6 km^{2} (150 acres).

Kolmanna is spread on the banks of Kadalundi River which is the third longest river in Malabar after Bharathappuzha and Chaliyar. The coordinate of Kolmanna is LAT 11.050404, LON 76.056374 Google Map link: https://www.google.com/maps/place/Kolmanna+Bus+Stop/@11.0500966,76.0544067,17z/data=!3m1!4b1!4m5!3m4!1s0x3ba64aee0081de61:0x9178db4d4416818e!8m2!3d11.0500966!4d76.0565954

== Transportation ==
It is located in between Hajiyar Palli and Pattar Kadavu on the Malappuram-Vengara road, 2.5 km from the Malappuram Civil Station. The Calicut International Airport is 25 km away from here. The nearest Railway Station is in Tirur which is about 22 km from Kolmanna.

== Official Status ==
Kolmanna is in Malappuram Municipality, Village office: Panakkad, Taluk:Ernad.

== People ==
A big part of the population are Muslims followed by Hindus. Christians are very negligible in Kolmanna. The major source of income is from the family members employed in Gulf countries. Other occupations include retail business and agriculture.

== Politics ==
KOLMANNA is in Malappuram assembly constituency is part of Malappuram (Lok Sabha constituency).[1]

== Photo gallery ==
Flood in Kolmanna

A View of Kolmanna

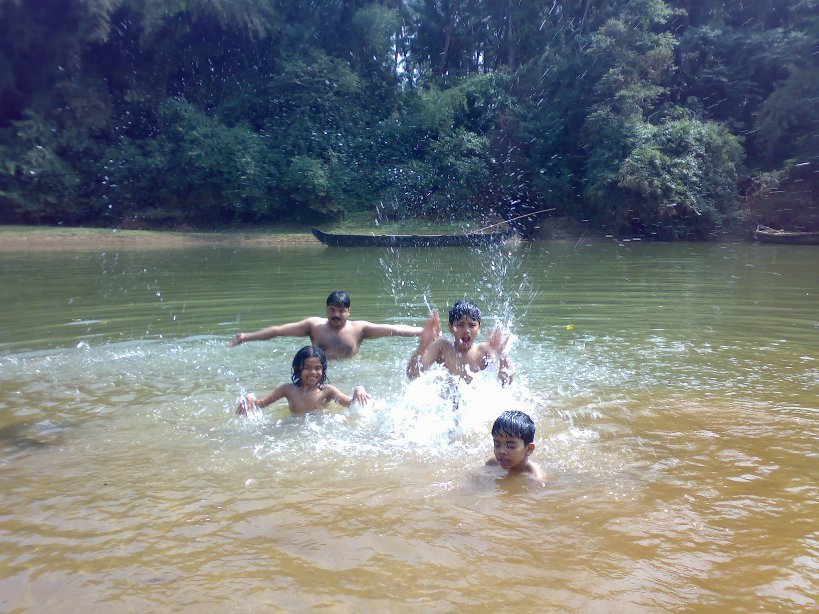
Take a bath in river
