= Sayyid Sadiq Ali Shihab Thangal =

Muslim community leader and politician from Kerala

Sayyid Panakkad Sayyid Sadiq Ali Shihab Thangal
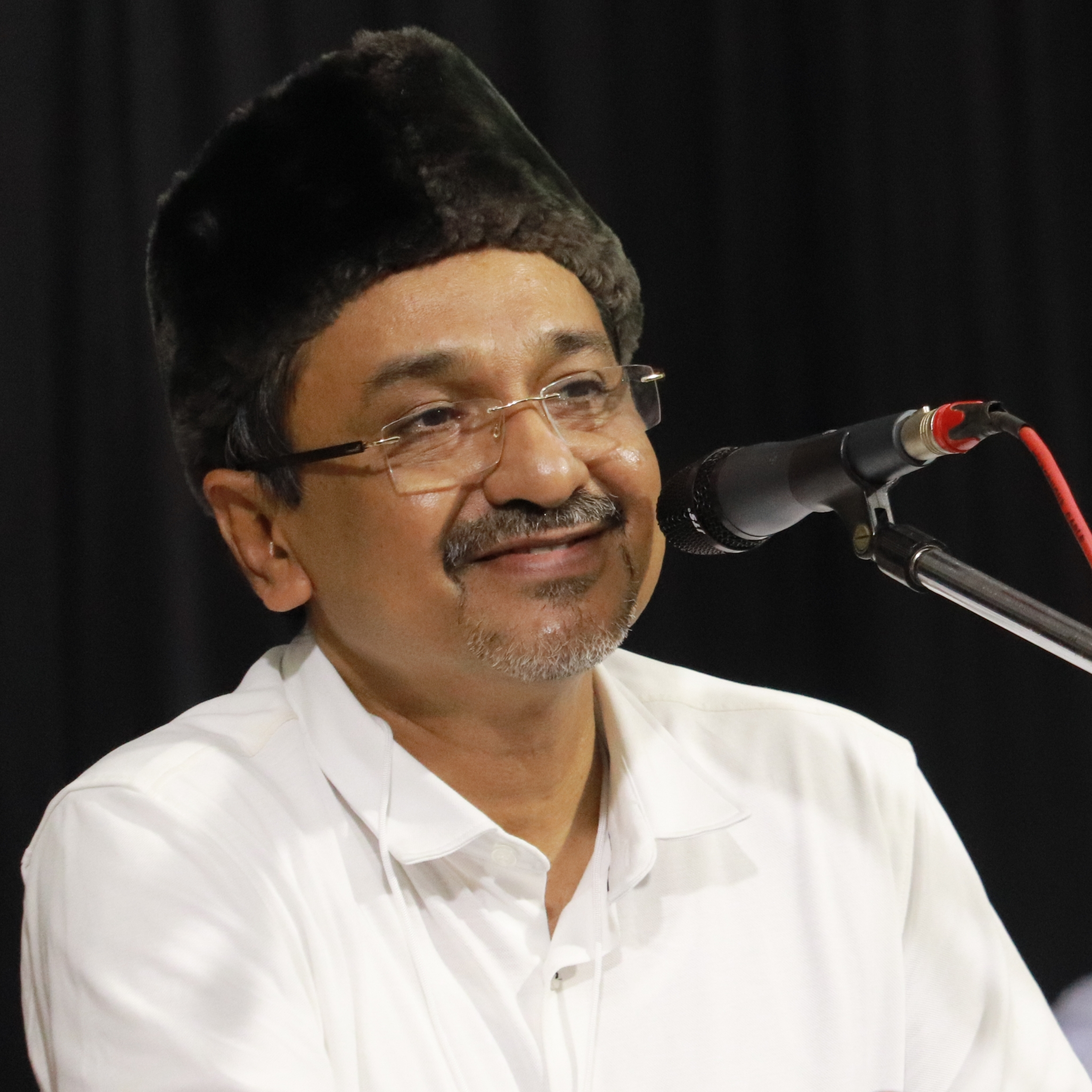
- Sayyid Sadiq Ali Shihab Thangal at Wafy Campus, Kalikavu, in 2025.

Kerala State President, Indian Union Muslim League
- Incumbent
- Assumed office 7 March 2022 Preceded: Sayed Hyderali Shihab Thangal

Chairman, Political Advisory Committee, Indian Union Muslim League
- Incumbent
- Assumed office 7 March 2022

Personal details
- Born: 25 May 1964 (age 62) Panakkad, (Malappuram), Kerala
- Party: Indian Union Muslim League
- Relations: Sayyid Muhammadali Shihab Thangal (brother); Sayyid Umerali Shihab Thangal (brother); Sayyid Hyderali Shihab Thangal (brother); Syed Abbas Ali Shihab Thangal (brother)
- Children: Sayyid Aseel Ali Shihab Thangal (son); Sayyid Shaheen Ali Shihab Thangal (son); Sayyid Yamin Ali Shihab Thangal (son)
- Parent: P. M. S. A. Pookkoya Thangal (father)
- Occupation: Community leader; Politician

Panakkad Sayyid Sadiq Ali Shihab Thangal (Birth name:Habib Sadiq Ali Shihab bin Ali Al-Hussaini Ba Alavi) (Arabic: صادق علي شهاب بن أحمد الحسيني با علوي)(born 25 May 1964) is a sayyid (thangal) community leader and politician from Kerala, southern India. He currently serves as the Kerala State President, Indian Union Muslim League, and chancellor of Darul Huda Islamic University.

Sadiq Ali Thangal is a member of the Pukkoya family of Panakkad (south Malabar). He is the son of P. M. S. A. Pukkoya Thangal and the younger brother of Mohammedali Thangal, Umerali Thangal and Hyderali Thangal. He is associated with Samastha Kerala Sunni Students Federation (S. K. S. S. F.) and Sunni Yuvajana Sangam (S. Y. S.), the student and youth wings of the E. K. faction of Samastha Kerala Jam'iyyat al-'Ulama', the principal Sunni-Shafi'i scholarly body in Kerala, and the Youth League, the youth wing of Indian Union Muslim League. He also served as the Malappuram District President, Indian Union Muslim League for over a decade. He later led the party de facto for a short span in the absence of his ailing brother Hyderali Thangal.

Sadiq Ali Thangal was chosen as the successor to Hyderali Thangal as the Kerala State President, Indian Union Muslim League in 2022. Sadiq Ali Thangal also serves as the Chairman, National Political Advisory Committee, Indian Union Muslim League. He is also Vice-President, Mounathul Islam Sabha, Ponnani, President, Noorul Huda Islamic College and Chairman, Islamic Centre, Kozhikode.He is also president of the CIC, He is also the member of the executive committee of the Samastha Matha Vidyabhyasa Board.
