= Panakkad =

- Village
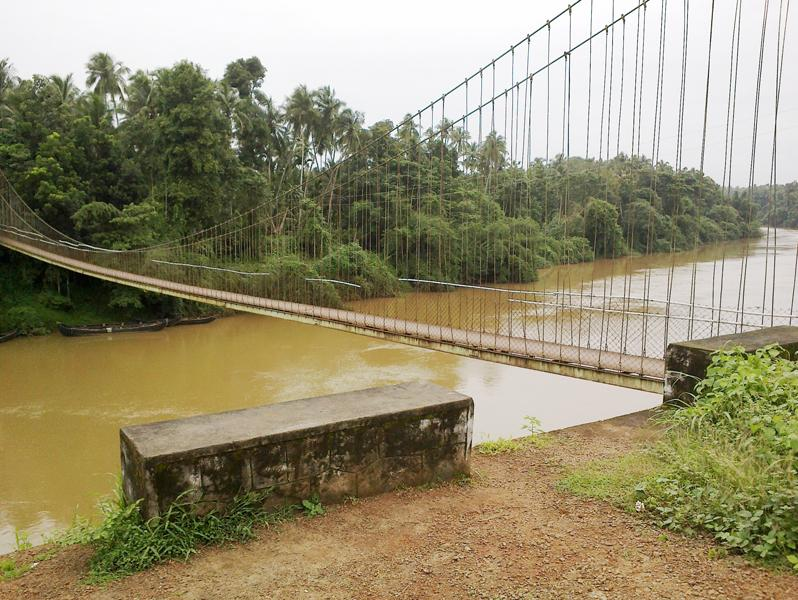
- Panakkad Bridge

- Location in Kerala, India
- Coordinates: 11.047°N 76.0417°E
- Country: India
- State: Kerala
- District: Malappuram

Languages
  - Official: Malayalam, English
- Time zone: UTC+5:30 (IST)
- Vehicle registration: KL-
- Vidhan Sabha constituency: Vengara

Panakkad is a small town and Village in Malappuram municipality in the state of Kerala, India. It is located on the banks of Kadalundippuzha river. Panakkad Thangal family resides in this village. Panakkad serves as one of the residential area of Malappuram city. The English and Foreign Languages University started its campus at Panakkad in 2013-14 academic year

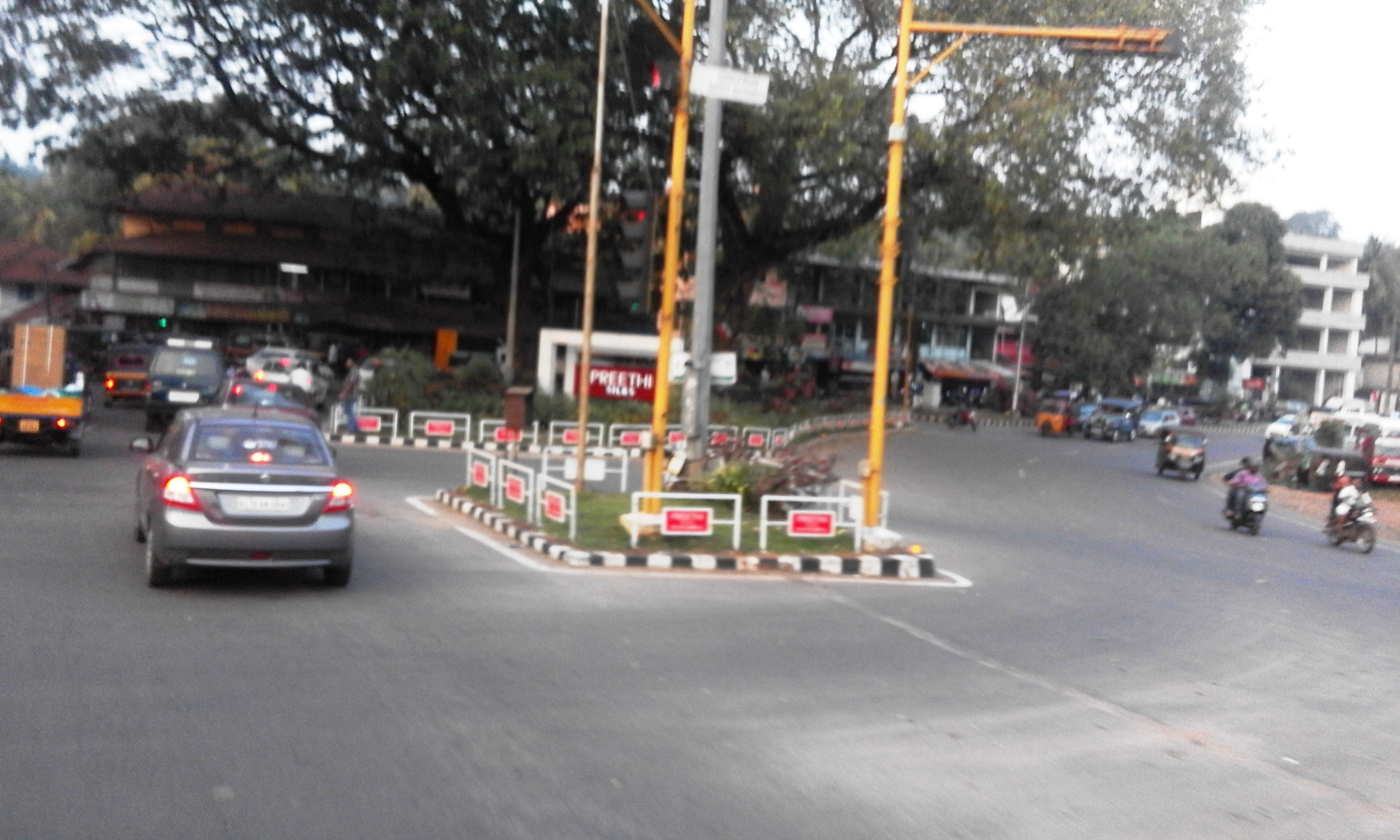
Panakkad Road begins from Kizhakkethala Junction in Malappuram

== Demographics ==
As of 2001 India census, Panakkad had a population of 6325 with 3012 males and 3313 females.

== Notable people ==
- Syed Muhammedali Shihab Thangal
- Pukkoya Tangal
- Sayed Hyderali Shihab Thangal
- Sayyid Sadiq Ali Shihab Thangal

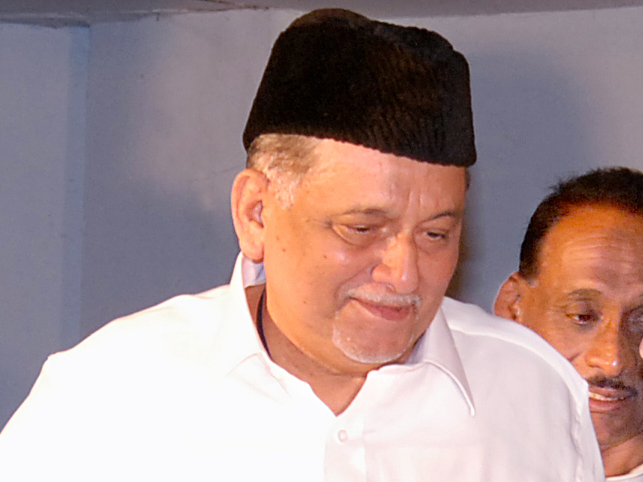
Panakkad Syed Mohammedali Shihab Thangal
