= Ahmad Ashfaque Karim =

Indian politician

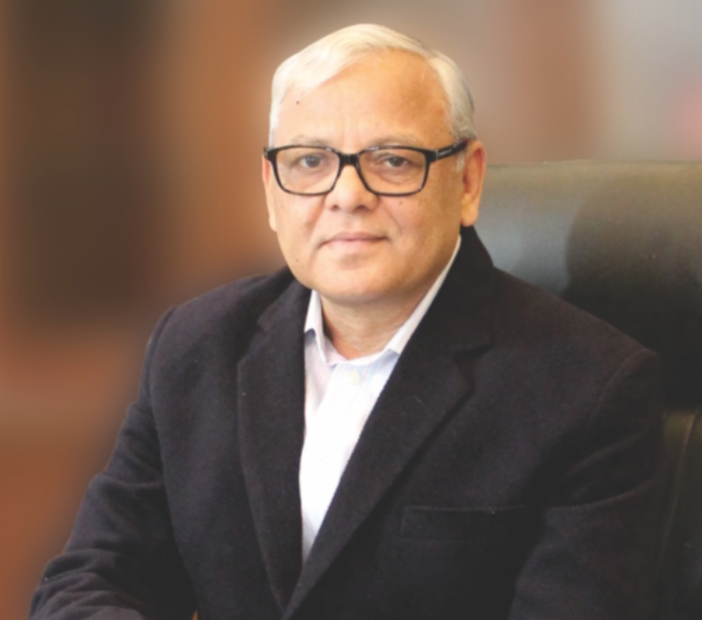

MP of Rajya Sabha for Bihar
- In office 3 April 2018 – 2 April 2024
- Preceded by: Anil Kumar Sahani, JD(U)
- Succeeded by: Sanjay Yadav, RJD
- Constituency: Bihar

Chancellor of the Al-Karim University Katihar, Bihar
- Incumbent
- Assumed office 2018
- Preceded by: Position established

Personal details
- Party: Janata Dal (United)

Ahmad Ashfaque Karim is a businessman, edupreneur and politician from Katihar, Bihar, India. He is a former Member of Parliament in the Rajya Sabha of the Indian Parliament. He is a part of Janata Dal (United) party.

Dr. Karim is the founder of several educational institutions, including Katihar Medical College and Al-Karim University, and has dedicated his career to education and healthcare, particularly benefiting the Kosi and Seemanchal regions of Bihar and the western part of West Bengal.

== Education ==
Dr. Ahmad Ashfaque Karim completed his higher education at Bihar College of Pharmacy. He obtained a Master of Pharmacy, and later completed a Ph.D., with his thesis focused on the “Biochemical profile of oxovanadium (IV & V) complexes.” His academic background provided a solid foundation for his contributions to the field of medical and healthcare facilities.

== Career ==
Dr. Karim has been active in politics since 1982 and has been deeply involved in various social and community organizations, emphasizing his dedication to social welfare, minority rights, and regional development. He began his political journey with Samata Dal before becoming active in various political organizations.

He is a former member of the All India Congress Committee and also the treasurer and General Secretary of the Bihar Pradesh Congress Committee. Dr. Karim was the National Vice-President of the Lok Janshakti Party (LJP).

Dr Ahmad Ashfaque Karim contested the 2009 Lok Sabha election from Katihar constituency of Bihar assembly elections on a Lok Janshakti Party (LJP) ticket but did not win. In 2012, Karim established and Kosi Bedari Morcha, a group that campaigns for special status for Bihar's eight districts in Kosi division, one of the poorest regions of India. He is the founder Chairman of Al-Karim Educational Trust, Patna, Bihar; founder Chancellor of Al-Karim University, Katihar, Bihar; and founder Chairman-cum-Managing Director of Katihar Medical College, Katihar, Bihar.

In April 2018, he was elected to the Rajya Sabha as a member of the Rashtriya Janata Dal (RJD) and he was one of five candidates elected unopposed. During his tenure in the Rajya Sabha, he served on various parliamentary committees, including the Committee on Member of Parliament Local Area Development Scheme (MPLADS), the Committee on Water Resources, the Standing Committee on Water Resources, the Consultative Committee for the Ministry of Health and Family Welfare, the Committee on Chemicals and Fertilizers, the Consultative Committee for the Ministry of Consumer Affairs, Food and Public Distribution, the Committee on Finance, and the Committee on Railways.

Dr. Karim has actively participated in various social and community organizations, highlighting his dedication to social welfare, minority rights, and regional development. He has founded and served as the Morcha President of the Kosi Bedari Morcha, advocating for special status for Bihar's Kosi region, and holds membership in influential bodies. He received the 'Synergy Award-2008' for excellence, presented by Mr. Syed Mahdi Nabizadeh, Ambassador of the Islamic Republic of Iran in India, on January 25, 2009, at the India Islamic Cultural Centre in New Delhi, in recognition of his valuable contributions to the field of education.

He is currently a member of the Janata Dal (United) party.
