= Abdullah bin Abdulmohsen Al-Turki =

Muslim religious leader (born 1940)

- عبد الله بن عبد المحسن التركي
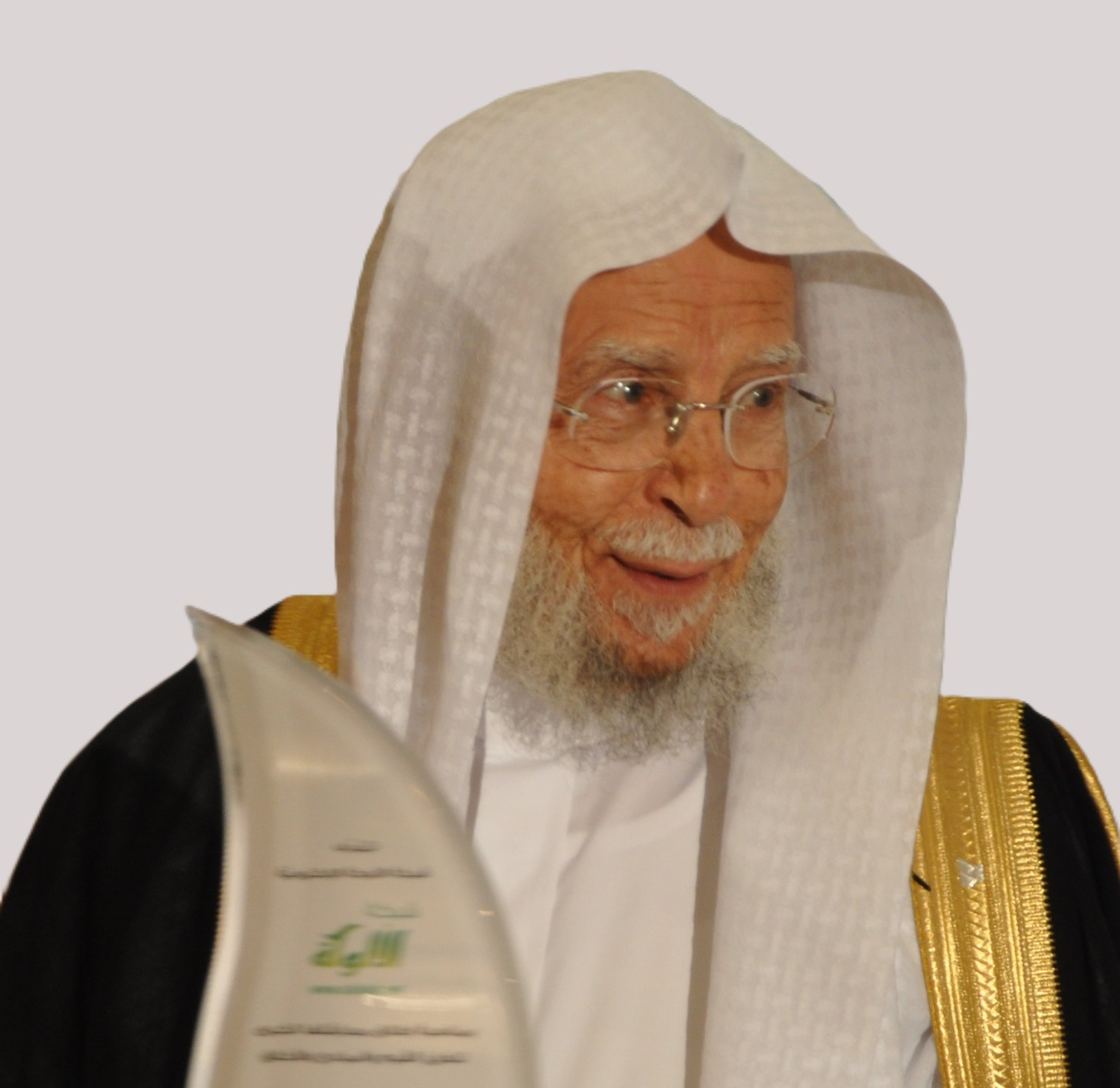
- Born: August 4, 1940 (age 86); Riyadh Province, Saudi Arabia
- Education: Sharia College, Riyadh (B.A., 1963); Higher Law Institute, Riyadh (M.A., 1969); Al-Azhar University, Cairo (Ph.D., 1972)
- Occupations: Religious scholar, academic, administrator
- Known for: Former General Secretary of the Muslim World League; Former Minister of Islamic Affairs, Saudi Arabia
- Title: Former Rector, Imam Muhammad ibn Saud Islamic University; Chairman, League of Islamic Universities

Abdullah bin Abdulmohsen Al-Turki (Arabic: عبد الله بن عبد المحسن التركي, born 4 August 1940) is a Muslim religious leader from Saudi Arabia who has been General Secretary of the Muslim World League.

== Birth and academic career ==
Al-Turki was born in Riyadh Province. He attended the Sharia College in Ar-Riyadh, graduating in 1963 with a bachelor's degree in Islamic Law. He attended the Higher Law Institute in Er-Riad, earning a master's degree in 1969. In 1972 he defended a thesis on foundations of Islamic jurisprudence at Al-Azhar University, Cairo making him the first Saudi to get a Ph.d. from Al-Azhar.

He taught at the Higher Scientific Institute from 1961 to 1969, and was Dean of the Arab Language College in Er-Riad from 1969 to 1975. He was appointed Provost of Imam Muhammad ibn Saud Islamic University in 1975, and later became rector of this university.

He had published numerous papers on Islamic studies, Sharia and Arabic language.

== Public positions ==
At-Turki was appointed Saudi Arabian Minister of Islam affairs, vakufs, appeals and morals in 1995, and mentor of King Fahd's Koran printing unit. He was Minister without the portfolio from 1999 to 2000, when he was appointed General Secretary of the Muslim World League. He is also chairman of various other institutions including the League of Islamic Universities, Global Islamic Council in London and World Islamic Council of Appeal and Salvation.

He is also the chairman of Islamic Universities Association (IUA). He has played an important role in establishing Islamic universities, including the Islamic University of Niger and the International Islamic University, Islamabad.

== Views ==
At a conference in Makkah in 2015, commenting on the violence caused by ISIS, he said: "The terrorism that we face within the Muslim Ummah and our own homelands today ... is religiously motivated. It has been founded on extremism, and the misconception of some distorted Sharia concept."

== Bibliography ==
Published books include:

- Osool Madhab al Imam Ahmed bin Hanbal (the fundamentals of imam Ahmed bin Hanbal school).
- Asbab Ikhtilaf Al Foqaha (the causes of differences between jurisprudence scholars).
- Menhaj Al Islam Fi Bina Al Osra (the approach of Islam in the building of family).
- Menjaj Al Malik Abdul Aziz (King Abdul Aziz's approach).
- Majmal Itikad Aimat Alk Salaf (a summary of the belief of previous imams).
- Menhaj Al tamul Ma Al Sira (the approach of dealing with the biography of the Prophet).
- Al imman Mohammed bin Saud: the state of Dawa wa Al Dohat (Immam Mohammed bin Saud: the state of the call and callers).
- Al Ommah Al Wasat wl al menhaj al nabawi fi al Dawa ela Allah (the middle national mission and the Prophetic approach in the call to Allah).
- Masoliat Al Dawla Al Islamiah an Al Dawa Ela Allah (the responsibility of the Islamic state for the call to Allah).
- Al Mamalaka Al Arabia Al Saudia wa khidmatiha lilislam wa Al Muslimeen fi Al Gharb (the Kingdom of Saudi Arabia and its services to Islam and Muslim in the West).
- Al Islam wa hokouk Al Insan (Islam and human rights).
- Tamolat fi Dawat Al sheikh Mohammed bin Abdul Wahab (contemplations in the call of sheikh Mohammed bin Abdul wahab)
