= Thangals =

Social group among the Muslims of Kerala

The Thangals (also spelled Tangals) are a social group among the Muslims of Kerala, south India. The Thangals are often regarded as roughly equivalent to the more general Sayyids or Sharifs, or descendants of Muhammad, of the wider Islamic culture. Most members of the community practice endogamy and rarely marry outside their community.

The Thangal families are numerous in Kerala, all receive recognition, but some are considered as saints. The Thangal identification brings much 'reverence and attention' in the Kerala Muslim community (which predominantly identifies with Shafi'i madhab). Some individuals take advice from the Thangals on crucial matters. A number of thangals in Kerala 'treat' people for illness and to 'ward off evils'.

Shihab, Mashoor, Hirdh, Bafaqi, Jifri, Jamalullayli are some of major Thangal families have many gradations of status on social and economic scale. Influential of the Thangals generally come from prominent business families. They usually exercise their influence through commerce and politics.

== Notable Thangal in north Kerala ==
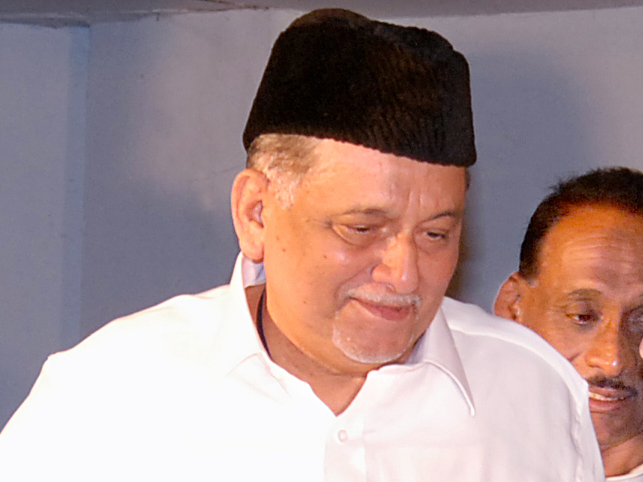
Syed Muhammedali Shihab Thangal (1936 - 2009)

- Pukkoya family (Panakkad-Kodappanakkal House)
  - P. M. S. A. Pukkoya Thangal (d. 1975)
  - Muhammedali Shihab Thangal (1936 - 2009)
  - Hyderali Shihab Thangal (1947 - 2022)
  - Sayed Abbas Ali Shihab Thangal (Born 31 May 1971)
- Kondotty Thangal Family

== Notes ==
1.Only some scholars consider the thangals as a 'community' among the Muslims of Kerala.
