= Katameri =

Village in Kozhikkode District, Kerala, India

Coordinates: 11.645°N 75.665°E

Katameri (also spelled Kadameri) is a small village near Vatakara, Kozhikode district in Kerala, India. It is around 14 km east from Vatakara. Katameri is a part of Ayancherry Panchayat. It is under Kuttiyadi assembly constitution. There are many educational institutions in Katameri.

== Educational institutions ==
- Katameri Mopla UP School
- Mifthahul huloom Higher Secondary Madrasa keeriyangadi
- Rahmaniyya Arabic College, Katameri
- RAC Public School Keeriyangadi
- RAC High school
- RAC Highersecondary School

== Temples ==
The temples are Katamei Paradevatha, Ganapathy and Subramanyan. Paradevatha temple festival usually takes place during the summer holidays. In ganapathi temple Shivraathri is the main attraction.

== Transportation ==
Kadameri village connects to other parts of India through Vatakara town on the west and Kuttiady town on the east. National highway No.66 passes through Vatakara and the northern stretch connects to Mangalore, Goa and Mumbai. The southern stretch connects to Cochin and Trivandrum. The eastern National Highway No.54 going through Kuttiady connects to Mananthavady, Mysore and Bangalore. The nearest airports are at Kannur and Kozhikode. The nearest railway station is at Vatakara.
