= Al-Karim University =

- Motto: Rabbi zidni ‘ilma
- Motto in English: My lord, increase me in knowledge
- Type: State Private University
- Established: 2018
- Affiliations: UGC, NMC
- Chancellor: Ahmad Ashfaque Karim
- Vice-Chancellor: Dr. Syed Moied Ahmed
- Location: Katihar, Bihar, India
- Colors: Green
- Website: www.alkarimuniversity.edu.in

Al-Karim University is a state private university located in Katihar, Bihar, India. The university was established in 2018 by the Al-Karim Education Trust, which also established, maintains and manages Katihar Medical College and Hospital since 1987. It operates under the Bihar Private Universities Act, 2013, one of the first six private universities planned in Bihar.
The university has a span of about 55 acres and runs 32 academic courses including 9 undergraduate and 23 postgraduate courses.

== Academics ==
The university offers MBBS courses as well as MD/MS courses in various medical specialties. In addition it offers 4½-year Bachelor of Science (B.Sc.) courses in various paramedical fields such as radio imaging and optometry, as well as Bachelor of Physiotherapy (BPT). It also offers a 3-year Bachelor of Computer Application (BCA) and 3-year postgraduate Master of Science (M.Sc.) studies in various allied medical fields such as biochemistry and anatomy.

== Faculties ==
=== Faculty of Medicine ===
The faculty of medicine runs one college and three schools to offer 31 academic courses.

- Katihar Medical College
- School of Pharmacy
- School of Nursing
- School of Paramedical and Allied Health Sciences

=== Faculty of Engineering and Technology ===
The faculty of engineering and technology has started with one school which provides one academic course.

- School of Information Technology and Management
