= Academy of Sharia and Advanced Studies =

Academy of sharia and advanced studies (ASAS)

Location
- Shakthan Nagar, near Heart Hospital; Thrissur, Kerala 680001; India; 10.512068297320406°N 76.2133535663957°E

Information
- Type: Higher Education
- Religious affiliation: Samastha Kerala Jem'iyyathul Ulema
- Authority: Malik Bin Deenar Islamic Complex (MIC)
- Principal: Muhammad Faizy Onampilly
- Student Union/Association: ASAS STUDENTS' FEDERATION (ASF)
- Website: https://miconline.org/

The Academy of Sharia and Advanced Studies (ASAS), run by Malik Bin Deenar Islamic Complex, located in Thrissur, is the first Islamic institute to include Sanskrit in its syllabus. Teaching Sanskrit, also known as "Deva Bhasa," to its students with the help of Hindu Scholars. As part of including Sanskrit, here important portions of the Bhagavad Gita, Upanishads, Mahabharata, and Ramayana are selectively taught.

According to a statement made to the Press Trust of India (PTI) by Hafiz Aboobacker, the previous Sanskrit syllabus lacked detail. However, a new syllabus has been introduced, which covers an eight-year curriculum starting from the plus-two level and continuing through post-graduation. Aboobacker emphasized that the latest syllabus provides a more comprehensive framework for the study of Sanskrit.

The institution known as the "Academy of Sharia and Advanced Studies" is frequently referred to as "MIC ASAS" by the surrounding community. The MIC ASAS has been teaching its students selective portions of the Bhagavad Gita, Upanishads, Mahabharata, and Ramayana in Sanskrit for the last seven years.
