= League of Islamic Universities =

Islamic organization based in Cairo, Egypt

The League of Islamic Universities (or Union of Islamic Universities) is an association of Islamic universities. It is based in Cairo. The chairman is Abdallah Ben Abdel Mohsen At-Turki, who is also general secretary of the Muslim World League.

== Principals ==
The League has supported a revival of the traditional waqf system of private welfare, which includes separation of schools from government control. The proceedings of a 1998 conference organized by the League noted: "The waqf system is in harmony with the principle of economic freedom, which was historically at the basis of the Islamic economy. Islamic governments, in fact, could not intervene in the activities of the individual and the Islamic state did not have any economic role of activities, contrary to what is happening today. The waqf system allowed, on the one hand, to redistribute wealth from the rich to the poor and, on the other, to support public utilities, such as mosques, hospitals and schools that must not, in a true Islamic state, be a government duty."

In January 2002 the executive council of the League of Islamic Universities issued the "Ismailia Declaration". This states that Islam has always urged Muslims to conduct dialogue with others in a wise and peaceful manner. It categorically denies reports of Muslims working for the destruction of contemporary civilization.

== Activities ==
In March 2005 the League announced a conference to be held in Morocco in September on "Islam and the West: Constant Relations and New Challenges". The League's Secretary General Jaffar Abdulsalam said the meeting of scholars would be organized with the European Islamic Conference, the General Federation of Muslims in France and the Islamic Educational, Scientific and Cultural Organization (ISESCO). It would review relations between Islam and the West and examine how international Islamic and European organizations could enhance these relations.

The League, working with the Sana'a University, organized the Second International Conference of Islamic Architecture and Arts in Sana'a, Yemen, in mid-June 2010. Conference participants discussed the importance of increasing awareness of the need to preserve Islamic architecture and the arts, which in many areas is threatened by the invasion of commercial areas.

== Relationship to FUIW ==
At a meeting of the Organisation of Islamic Cooperation meeting in Islamabad, Pakistan, in November / December 1987, it was agreed that ISESCO would set up a federation of Islamic countries' universities. Mr. Mohamed Ben Bachir, Secretary General of the League of Islamic Universities, expressed his support for the establishment of the Federation of the Universities of the Islamic World.

The fourth general conference of the Federation of the Universities of the Islamic World (FUIW) was held on 4–5 April 2007 in Kuwait. The secretary general presented a report on "the Merger Project between the FUIW and the League of Islamic Universities". This report described the outcome of the meetings between the General Secretariat of the Federation of the Universities of the Islamic World and the League of Islamic Universities. After discussing the report, the meeting appealed to the League of Islamic Universities to enhance joint Islamic action by working towards merger with the FUIW.
