= Pukkoya family of Panakkad =

Yemeni-origin sayyid family in Kerala

- Parent family: al-Shihabuddin of the Ba 'Alawi sada
- Country: India
- Current region: Kerala
- Origin: Hadhramaut
- Founded: End of 18th century
- Founder: Sayyid Ali al-Shihabuddin Ba 'Alawi
- Connected families: other Thangal families in Kerala
- Distinctions: Political and religious prominence
- Traditions: Ba 'Alawiyya; Shafi'i Madhhab

Pukkoya family of Panakkad is a Yemeni-origin sayyid, known locally in Kerala as thangal family based in present-day northern Kerala. The family, descending from the family of Muhammad, is generally revered by the Sunni Shāfiʿī Kerala Muslims. The thangals are respected as religious and political leaders amongst the Muslims of Kerala.

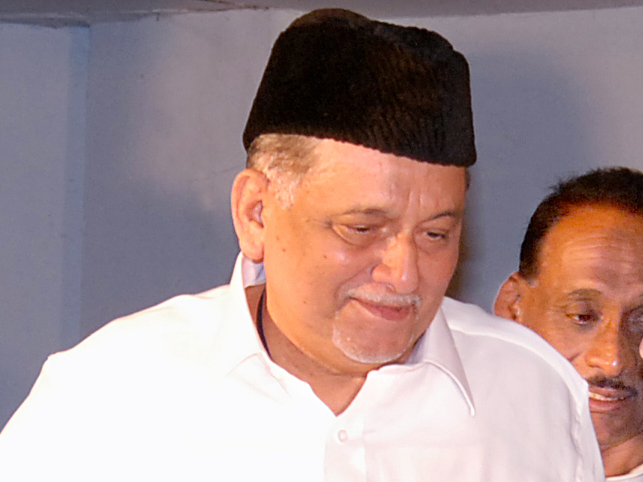
Sayyid Muhammedali Shihab Thangal (1936 - 2009)

The Panakkad family descended from Sayyid Ali Al-Shihabuddin who emigrated from the Ḥaḍramawt region of Yemen to Kerala in the 18th century along with his family. By the 19th century, the ethnic Yemenis came to occupy a powerful position within the north Kerala Muslim community. They were eventually recognized as the theological, juridical, and political community leaders of Kerala Muslims.

Kodappanakal House is the ancestral house of the family. Sayyid Sadiq Ali Shihab Thangal (born 1964) is the head of the Panakkad Thangal family at present.

== Prominent members ==
- Sayyid Ali Al-Shihabuddin (18th century)
- Sayyid Hussain ibn Muhlar Al-Shihabuddin (1812–1882)
- P. M. S. A. Pukkoya Thangal (died 1975)
- Sayyid Muhammedali Shihab Thangal (1936–2009)
- Sayyid Hyderali Shihab Thangal (1947–2022)
- Sayyid Sadiq Ali Shihab Thangal (born 1964)
- Sayed Abbas Ali Shihab Thangal (born 31 May 1971)
