= Pang, Malappuram =

Village in Kerala, India

Pang is a village in Malappuram district in the state of Kerala, India.

== Location ==
The village is 16 km (9.9 mi) away from Malappuram town via Malappuam-Chattipparambu-Padapparambu route. The place can be reached from Perinthalmanna via Angadippuram-Puzhakkattiri- Padapparambu route and from Kottakkal via Indianoor- Pang Chendi route and vettichira-Kadampuzha-chendi route. It can be reached from Valanchery via Edayur. Pang is one of the rare village which has same distance to the most famous towns of Malappuram such as Malappuram, Kottakkal, perinthamanna, valanjeri around 16-18 kilometres and tirur, kuttippuram, manjeri around 20-22 kilometres.

== History ==
Pang formed an important strategic location in the medieval polity of Valluvanad, a kingdom in present-day Malappuram district. Historical accounts and local traditions hold that Pang marked the western frontier of Valluvanad and served as a stronghold that resisted repeated attempts by the Zamorin of Calicut (Samoothiri) to subdue the region. Even when the Zamorin encircled most of Valluvanad, Pang and its adjoining areas remained unconquered for a significant period.

The locality is closely associated in oral history with the Mamankam festival of Thirunavaya, where Valluvanad warriors (known as Chavers) traditionally challenged the Zamorin’s claim of guardianship. Among these narratives is that of Chandrathil Chathunni, remembered as the last Chaver warrior from the Valluvanad side. Belonging to the Chandrathil Tharavadu of Pang Chendi, he is said to have fought through the Zamorin’s forces during Mamankam and reached the Nilapadu Thara, the elevated seat of the Zamorin. According to legend, Chathunni struck at the Zamorin with his sword but was intercepted when his blow struck a lamp and the ruler’s hand, before being fatally attacked by Mangattachan, the Zamorin’s commander.

Folklore further recalls that four Valluvanad families — Chandrathil (Pang Chendi), Puthumana (Vattalur), Vayankara, and Verkkott — were repeatedly involved in the Mamankam struggles. The Manikkinar (sacred well) at Thirunavaya is remembered in ballads as having been filled with the bodies of fallen Chavers, many of them from these lineages. Following the death of Chathunni, tradition holds that the Zamorin discontinued the Mamankam festival, fearing renewed assaults.

As a cultural remembrance of these events, a small memorial institution known as the Mamankam Mandapam exists in Pang Chendi. Local memory also identifies Pang itself as a fort-like settlement that symbolized Valluvanad’s resistance.

== Culture ==
Pang is today a predominantly Muslim-populated village, with Hindus forming a significant minority. The cultural life of the area reflects this demographic balance.

Traditional Mappila folk arts such as Duff Muttu, Kolkali, Oppana, and Aravanamuttu remain popular in community gatherings and festivals. Many mosques in the village maintain attached libraries that preserve a rich corpus of Islamic texts, including works written in Arabi-Malayalam, a version of Malayalam rendered in Arabic script. Evening prayers at local mosques are often followed by discussions on social, cultural, and even family matters, functioning as informal community forums.

The Hindu community of Pang continues its temple-centered cultural and religious traditions, celebrating festivals and performing rituals with the same regularity seen across Kerala. These practices, alongside the Muslim traditions, create a cultural fabric characteristic of Malappuram district: a blend of Islamic and Hindu heritage coexisting within the same locality.

== Transportation ==
Pang village connects to other parts of India through valanchery town. National highway No.66 passes through valanchery and the northern stretch connects to Goa and Mumbai. The southern stretch connects to Cochin and Trivandrum. State Highway No.28 starts from Nilambur and connects to Ooty, Mysore and Bangalore through Highways.12,29 and 181. National Highway No.966 connects to Palakkad and Coimbatore. The nearest airport is at Karipur. The nearest major railway station is at Tirur.
