= Samastha =

Samastha may refer to:

- Samastha Kerala Jem-iyyathul Ulama (EK faction), a scholarly body of EK Sunnis in Kerala, India
- Samastha Kerala Jem-iyyathul Ulama (AP faction), a scholarly body of AP Sunnis in Kerala, India
