= Katihar Medical College and Hospital =

Katihar Medical College
- Other name: KMCH
- Type: Private
- Established: 1987
- Founder: Al-Karim Educational Trust
- Affiliations: Al-Karim University
- Chairman: Ahmad Ashfaque Karim
- Principal: Ram Bilas Gupta
- Undergraduates: 150
- Postgraduates: 67
- Location: Karim Bagh, Katihar, Bihar, 854106, India; 25.5826°N 87.5455°E
- Website: www.kmckatihar.org

Katihar Medical College Hospital

Geography
- Location: Katihar, Bihar, India
- Coordinates: 25.5836°N 87.5465°E

Organisation
- Type: Teaching

Services
- Beds: 590

Links
- Lists: Hospitals in India

Katihar Medical College (KMC) is a medical college situated in the city of Katihar in the Indian state of Bihar. Katihar Medical College offers undergraduate courses in Bachelor of Medicine and Bachelor of Surgery (MBBS) and post-graduate courses (MD/MS And PG Diploma) in almost all Clinical and Non-Clinical Subjects. The college was established and is maintained by the Patna-based Al-Karim Educational Trust.

== Campus ==
Katihar Medical College & Hospital spans an area of more than 55 acres (22.25 hectares), with a built-up area of 900,000 square feet (84,000 m^{2}). It is located in Karim Bagh on the Katihar-Purnia road, about 5 kilometres (3.1 mi) from the Katihar Junction railway station. Located in the main building of the institute, the college library covers an area of 17,500 square feet (1,630 m^{2}). The library houses over 16,000 books and has subscriptions to 51 Indian and 57 foreign journals. A 500-seat college auditorium is used for cultural programs and seminars. The college also hosts a 600-bed general hospital staffed by 331 doctors and 175 nurses. The teacher-to-student ratio is 1:2.

== Administration ==
The college was established in 1987 by the Patna-based Al-Karim Educational Trust with the objective of providing specialised medical facilities for the region. Ahmad Ashfaque Karim is the chairman and managing director of the college and also the Founder Chairman of its parent Al-Karim Education Trust. The Principal of the college is Dr. Ram Bilas Gupta

== Admission ==
The college admits 150 Bachelor of Medicine and Bachelor of Surgery (MBBS) students annually. Candidates are selected on the basis of their performance in the National Eligibility and Entrance Test. Sixty percent, 25 percent, and 15 percent of seats are reserved for the Muslim community, general category, and Non-Resident Indian candidates, respectively. It is the only private medical college of Bihar to have a Non-Resident Indian quota.
