= Jamia Nusrathul Islam =

University of Jamia Nusrath
- Motto: Education for Humanity
- Established: 1997
- Chancellor: E. Sulaiman Musliyar
- Vice-Chancellor: Ali Baqavi Attupuram
- Students: 1043
- Location: Kottakkal, Kerala, India
- Campus: Wadi nusrath
- Affiliations: Jamiathul Hind Al-Islamiyya
- Website: http://www.jamianusrath.in

Jamia Nusrath is an Islamic university in Kerala. This institution opened in 1997. It is located in Randathani, Malappuram in India. The foundation was laid by Islamic scholar O. K. Usthad. The university has more than 3000 students under institutes such as Dava and Sharea and junior Dava colleges and a special English medium school located at Poovanchina, Randathani, Malappuram. OK Usthad Research Center conducts academic conferences and is the major project of the university.

== About the university ==
The society was established on 28 July 1997.

== Administrators ==
- Cherussola Beeran Kutty Musliyar, Former President
- Ali Baqavi Attupuram, Chairman
- Dr. Hussain Randathani, Technical Secretary
- Shamsudheen saqafi sidheeqi, Dawa College Principal

== Major institutes ==
| Institutions | Organisations |
College of Dawa
| College of Shari'a | SMILE charity foundation |
| Research Centre | Nusrath Secondary school |
| Nusrath Sunni Madrassa | Lingo Hut |
| Oro Hub | Hope |

- College of Dawa
- Shari'ath College
- Research Centre
- Madrassas
- SMILE charity foundation
- Nusrath secondary school
- Lingo Hut
- Oro Hub
- Hope
- Nafeesathul Misriyya Quran Institute
