= India–Saudi Arabia relations =

- India: Saudi Arabia

Diplomatic mission
- Embassy of India, Riyadh: Embassy of Saudi Arabia, New Delhi

Envoy
- Indian Ambassador to Saudi Arabia Suhel Ajaz Khan: Saudi Arabian Ambassador to India Saud bin Mohammed Al-Saty

India–Saudi Arabia relations (Hindi: भारत-सऊदी संबंध) (Arabic: العلاقات الهندية السعودية), also referred to as Indian-Saudi relations or Indo-Saudi relations, are the bilateral relations between the Republic of India and the Kingdom of Saudi Arabia. Relations between the two nations are generally strong and close, especially in commercial interests. Indo-Saudi bilateral trade reached USD 41.88 billion in the financial year 2024–25. Saudi Arabia's exports to India stood at USD 30.12 billion whereas India's exports were USD 11.76 billion.

Saudi Arabia has been India's second largest trading partner after China while India is Saudi Arabia's fifth largest trading partner. The two countries share a close cordial relationship, and Saudi Arabia has been a popular migration destination for Indian Muslims who share strong religious ties with the Kingdom.

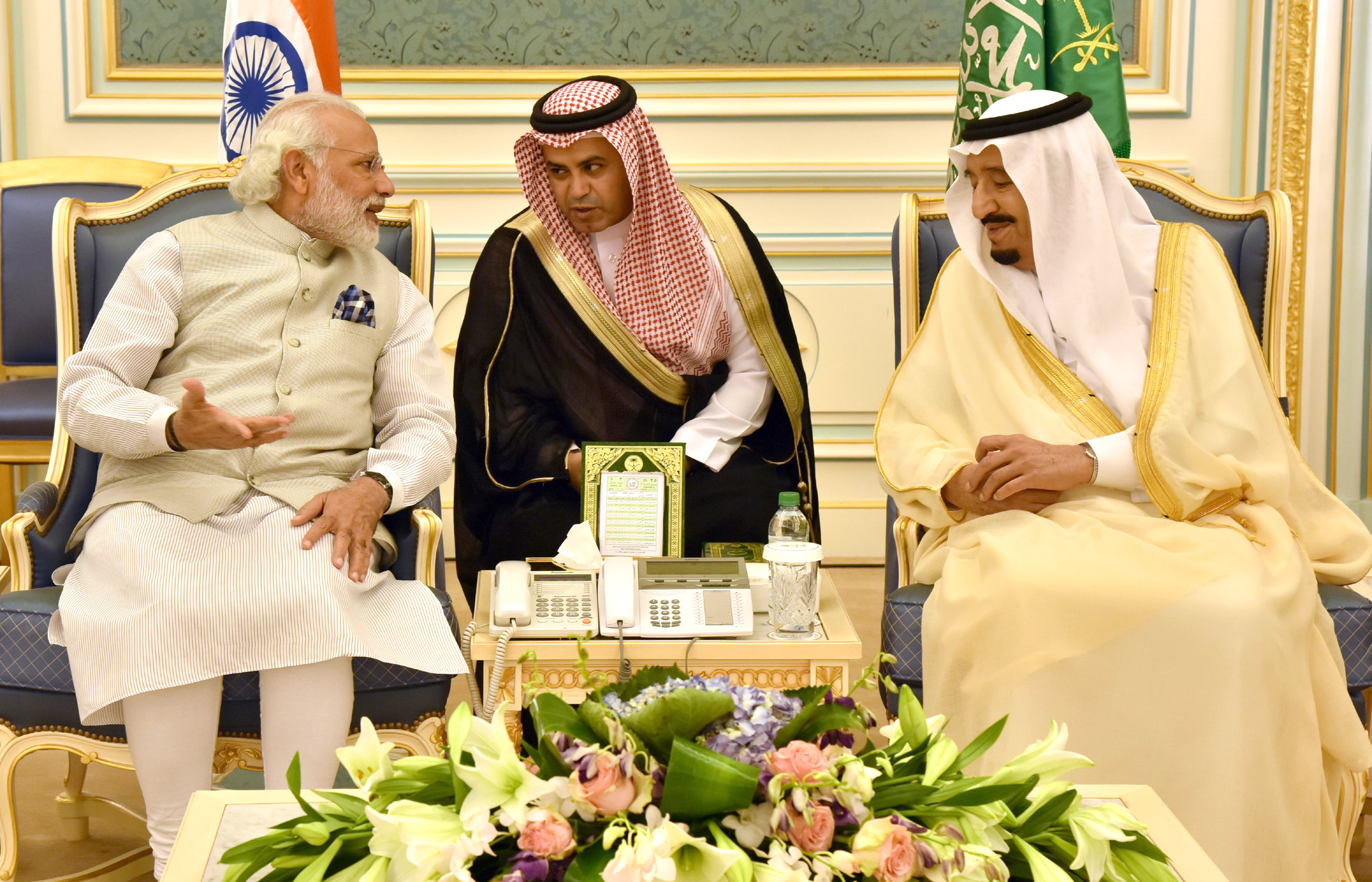
Prime Minister Narendra Modi meeting King Salman, at the Royal Court in Riyadh; c. 2016.

== History ==
Trade and cultural links between ancient India and Arabia date back to the third millennium BC. By 1000 AD, the trade relations between southern India and Arabia flourished and became the backbone of the Arabian economy. Arab traders held a monopoly over the spice trade between India and Europe until the rise of European imperialist empires. India was one of the first nations to establish ties with the Third Saudi State. During the 1930s, British India heavily funded Najd through financial subsidies.

Formal diplomatic relations between contemporary India and Saudi Arabia were established soon after India gained independence in 1947. Relations between the two countries have strengthened considerably owing to collaboration in regional affairs and trade. Saudi Arabia is one of the largest suppliers of oil to India, who is one of the top seven trading partners and the fifth biggest investor in Saudi Arabia.

In history there have been four visits to Saudi Arabia by an Indian Prime Minister: Jawaharlal Nehru (1955), Indira Gandhi (1982), Manmohan Singh (2010) and Narendra Modi (2016) . The two countries share similar views on combating terrorism. There is a strong geographical and a demographic connect between the two countries as Islam is the 2nd major religion in India. Moreover, the Muslim population in India is the second largest in the world, thus sending a huge number of Indian pilgrims every year for Umrah and Hajj.

== Background ==
Since its independence in 1947, India has sought to maintain strong ties with Saudi Arabia, an important regional power and trading base in West Asia. In a major visit by King Saud of Saudi Arabia to India in November 1955, both nations agreed to shape their relationship based on the Five Principles of Peaceful Co-existence. Saudi Arabia is also home to more than 1.4 million Indian workers. India was the only South Asian nation to recognise the Soviet-backed Democratic Republic of Afghanistan, whereas Saudi Arabia was one of the key supporters of the Afghan mujahideen, who fought the Soviets and their Afghan allies from Pakistan.

== Development of bilateral relations ==
India's strategic relations with Saudi Arabia had previously been affected by the latter's relations with Pakistan. Saudi Arabia supported Pakistan's stance during the Indo-Pakistani War of 1971, at the expense of its relations with India. The Soviet Union's close relations with India also negatively affected Indo-Saudi relations. During the Persian Gulf War (1990–91), India officially maintained neutrality. Saudi Arabia's close military and strategic ties with Pakistan have also been a source of continuing strain.

However, since the 1990s, both nations have taken steps to improve ties. Saudi Arabia has supported granting observer status to India in the Organisation of Islamic Cooperation (OIC) and has expanded its collaboration with India to fight Islamic terrorism in the Middle East. In January 2006, King Abdullah of Saudi Arabia made a special visit to India, becoming the first Saudi monarch in 51 years to do so. The Saudi king and the Indian Prime Minister Manmohan Singh signed an agreement forging a strategic energy partnership that was termed the "Delhi Declaration." The pact provides for a "reliable, stable and increased volume of crude oil supplies to India through long-term contracts." Both nations also agreed on joint ventures and the development of oil and natural gas in public and private sectors. An Indo-Saudi joint declaration in the Indian capital New Delhi described the king's visit as "heralding a new era in India-Saudi Arabia relations." Saudi Arabia has also repeatedly rejected Pakistani requests to support Pakistan and condemn India on the Kashmir conflict.

In 2019, Saudi Arabia increased the Hajj quota of India, making it the 2nd highest country in the number of Pilgrims. Thus, the number of Indian pilgrims jumped to 200,000 per year in 2019.

In October 2021, India voted against a Dutch resolution in the UN Human Rights Council that proposed extending the mandate of the Group of Eminent Experts (GEE) human rights investigators in Yemen. This resolution had been heavily lobbied against by Saudi Arabia.

In May 2023, Saudi Arabia partially boycotted a G20 tourism meeting held by India in Kashmir. Ultimately, it participated with downgraded representation, only sending Embassy officials.

In September 2023, the Saudi Foreign Minister expressed the Kingdom's desire to mediate in the Kashmir conflict as part of Saudi Arabia's support for "Muslim peoples in their efforts to maintain their Islamic identity and preserve their dignity".

In April 2024, Saudi Arabia issued a statement calling for the Kashmir conflict to be resolved bilaterally between India and Pakistan, aligning with India's position on the issue.

== Commerce ==
Since the 1990s, India's economic liberalisation has helped bolster trade with Saudi Arabia, which annually supplies to India nearly 175 million barrels (25 million metric tonnes) of crude oil, or a quarter of its needs. In 2006–07 bilateral trade stood at US$16 billion (US$3 billion excluding oil) and is expected to double by 2010. India's current exports to Saudi Arabia stand at US$2.6 billion, while Saudi Arabia's exports are in the range of US$13.4 billion (US$1.2 billion excluding oil). India's major exports include basmati rice, textiles and garments and machinery, while it imports organic and inorganic chemicals, metal scrap, leather, gold and oil from Saudi Arabia. Both nations are expected to expand trade and cooperation and joint ventures in telecommunications, pharmaceuticals, health services, information technology, biotechnology, agriculture, construction projects, energy and financial services. Both countries agreed to launch joint ventures for developing gas-based fertiliser plants in Saudi Arabia. India agreed to set up institutes of higher education and research, provide educational opportunities in India for Saudi Arabian students and expand cooperation between India's Council of Scientific and Industrial Research and the Saudi Arabian Standards Organisation (SASO).

India and Saudi trade was almost US$25 billion last fiscal year with about 2 million Indians working in Saudi Arabia .

Saudi imports from India amounted to $7 billion or 2.7% of India's overall exports in 2015. The 10 major commodities exported from India to Saudi Arabia were:

1. Cereals: $1.8 billion
2. Spices: $1.1 billion
3. Machinery: $459 million
4. Iron or steel products: $367.8 million
5. Organic chemicals: $336.8 million
6. Meat: $267.9 million
7. Vehicles: $229 million
8. Ceramic products: $217.4 million
9. Electronic equipment: $203.9 million
10. Clothing (not knit or crochet): $162.8 million

Saudi exports to India amounted to $21.4 billion or 5.5% of India's overall imports in 2015. The 10 major commodities exported from Saudi Arabia to India were:

1. Oil: $16.4 billion
2. Organic chemicals: $1.2 billion
3. Plastics: $954.2 million
4. Fertilizers: $729.9 million
5. Gems, precious metals: $631.4 million
6. Aircraft, spacecraft: $542.9 million
7. Inorganic chemicals: $199.5 million
8. Aluminum: $193.6 million
9. Copper: $142.9 million
10. Other chemical goods: $95.3 million

In 2018, the bilateral trade relations between the two countries hit $27.5 billion.

In 2023, the UAE and Saudi Arabia joined BRICS.

== Bilateral investment ==
India and Saudi Arabia are developing countries and need two-sided flow of investment in infrastructure and development. Progressive growth has been observed between the countries in bilateral investment after the liberalisation policy of India in 1991 and little bit faster increase in new millennium. Saudi Arabia is ranked at 15th position in country-wise FDI joint venture in India and it is second in Arab countries followed by UAE. Saudi has US$21.55 million worth value in FDI joint venture during 2004–05 to 2007–08. Saudi is also among the major FDI investing countries in India, it has invested ₹422 million (US$4.4 million) during August 1991 to December 1999 and ₹691 million (US$7.2 million) during January 2000 to August 2008. Investment is observed in diverse fields such as paper manufacture, chemicals, computer software, granite processing, industrial products and machinery, cement, metallurgical industries, etc. Indian firms also has shown the interest in Saudi market after new Saudi laws and established joint venture projects or wholly owned subsidiaries in the Kingdom. According to Saudi investment authority survey, India has 56 FDI projects having worth of 304 million SAR during 2005 in Saudi Arabia. These licenses are for projects in different sectors such as management and consultancy services, construction projects, telecommunications, information technology, pharmaceuticals, etc. Moreover, several Indian companies have established collaborations with Saudi companies and working in the Kingdom in the areas of designing, consultancy, financial services and software development.

== 2010 visit to Saudi Arabia by Manmohan Singh ==
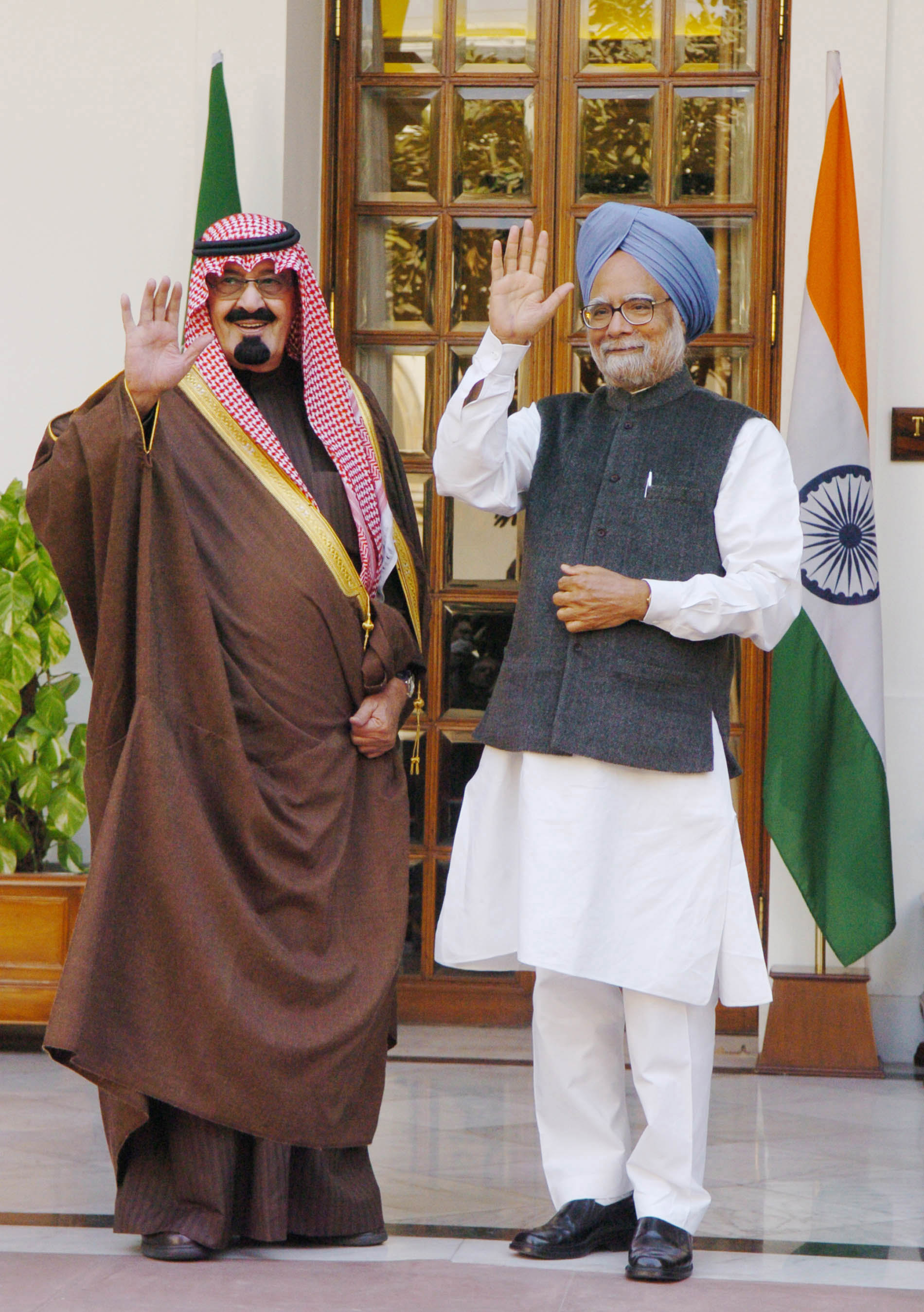
Indian Prime Minister Manmohan Singh with King Abdullah in New Delhi, c. January 25, 2006

Indian Prime Minister Manmohan Singh undertook a three-day visit to Saudi Arabia beginning 27 February 2010. He was accompanied by his wife Gursharan Kaur, Health Minister Ghulam Nabi Azad, Commerce and Industry Minister Anand Sharma, Petroleum Minister Murli Deora and Minister of State for External Affairs Shashi Tharoor. It was the first visit to the kingdom by an Indian Prime Minister since 1982 and the third to date.

In a rare diplomatic gesture symbolising the strong cultural and socio-economic ties between the two nations, Dr Singh and his official delegation were received at the royal terminal of the King Khalid International Airport by Crown Prince Sultan bin Abdul Aziz accompanied by his entire cabinet. In departure from the protocol norms, a red carpet was rolled out to the Prime Minister, instead of the traditional green carpet. The nearly 40 km route from the airport to the city centre was lined with Indian and Saudi Arabian flags.

On the second day, a formal reception was held in honour of the state guests. Singh was scheduled to address the Majlis-e-Shura, a privilege that has been described as "a singular honour". Female diplomat Latha Reddy was permitted not to wear the abaya or the hijab. This special gesture was described as "largely symbolic in nature, but it is a sign of the changing times".

During his visit Singh received an honorary doctorate from Saudi Arabia's King Saud University. An MoU for co-operation was signed between Indian Institute of Science, Bangalore and the King Saud University in the presence of the Prime Minister. Later, speaking at a community event at the Indian Embassy hosted by Indian Ambassador Talmeez Ahmed, the Prime Minister praised the contributions made by the over 1.8 million Indian citizens. "India is proud of you and proud of your achievements in this country," he said.

An extradition treaty was signed by Indian Health and Family Welfare Minister Ghulam Nabi Azad and Prince Naif bin Abdul Aziz the Saudi Arabian Second Deputy Prime Minister and Interior Minister. Four agreements pertaining to transfer of sentenced persons, cultural co-operation, Memorandum of Understanding between Indian Space Research Organisation and King Abdulaziz City for Science and Technology for co-operation in peaceful use of outer space and joint research and information technology were also signed in presence of the two leaders. Four other agreements were also signed the day before, including one by Tata Motors to supply school buses worth US$80 million.

Singh returned home on 1 March 2010 concluding this three-day visit. This visit is considered as India's attempt to increase the depth of relationships between the two countries and make a pitch for investments from Saudi Arabia.

== 2016 visit by Narendra Modi ==
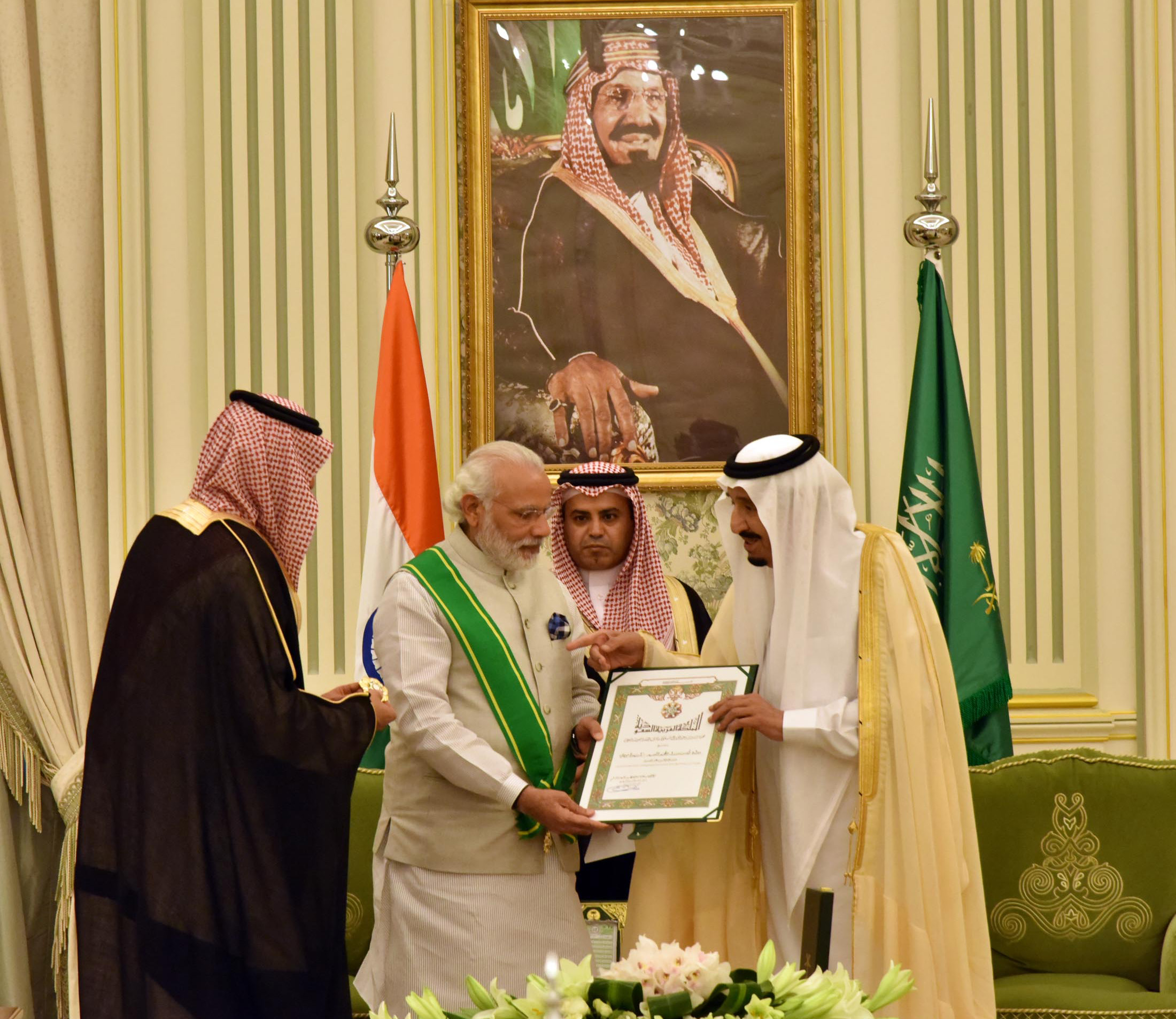
Indian Prime Minister Narendra Modi being conferred the Order of King Abdulaziz by King Salman, c. 2016.

Indian prime minister Narendra Modi visited Saudi Arabia in April, 2016. The agenda of the visit was energy, security, trade and well-being of Indian diaspora. During the visit, Modi was conferred the Order of King Abdulaziz which is Saudi Arabia's highest civilian honor.

== 2019 visit to India ==
The Saudi Crown Prince, Muhammad bin Salman, made a visit to India during his journey to many Asian countries in February, 2019. The crown prince met the Indian prime minister as well as a number of high officials in India. The main aim of the visit is to improve the historical ties between the two countries. The two sides agreed on increasing trade relations between them. Moreover, the number of Indian pilgrims performing Hajj in Saudi Arabia has been increased to 200,000 every year. The Saudi prince expected that the Saudi investment in India may reach $100 billion in the next two years. Current bilateral Trade stands $42.81 billion.

== Resident diplomatic missions ==
- India has an embassy in Riyadh and a consulate-general in Jeddah.
- Saudi Arabia has an embassy in New Delhi and a consulate-general in Mumbai.

== See also ==
- Indians in Saudi Arabia
- Foreign relations of India
- Foreign relations of Saudi Arabia
