= Sayed Muhammed Ali Shihab Thangal =

Indian Islamic scholar (1936–2009)

Sayyid Mohammed Ali Shihab Thangal
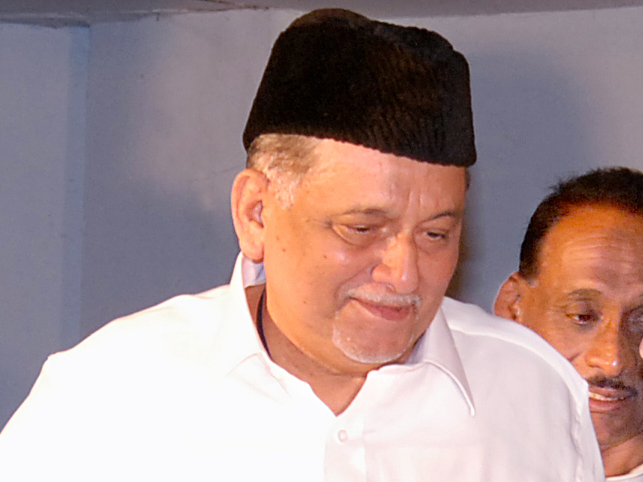
- Mohammed Ali Shihab Thangal in July 2008
- Born: 4 May 1936; Malappuram, Malabar District, British India
- Died: 1 August 2009 (aged 73); Malappuram, Kerala (India)
- Education: Al-Azhar University; Cairo University
- Occupations: Community leader; Islamic scholar; Politician
- Spouses: Shareefa Fatima Beevi (died 2006); Aysha Beevi (married 2006)
- Children: Munavvar Ali Shihab Thangal; Basheer Ali Shihab Thangal
- Parent: P. M. S. A. Pookkoya Thangal (father)
- Relatives: Sayed Umerali Shihab Thangal (brother); Sayed Hyderali Shihab Thangal (brother); Syed Sadiq Ali Shihab Thangal (brother); Syed Abbas Ali Shihab Thangal (brother)

Sayed Muhammad Ali Shihab Thangal (Malayalam: സയ്യിദ് മുഹമ്മദലി ഷിഹാബ് തങ്ങൾ) (4 May 1936 – 1 August 2009) was an Indian Islamic scholar, community leader, and politician from Kerala. He is sometimes regarded as "the most important Mappila leader" of modern Kerala.

Born in the Hadhrami-origin Thangal Pukkoya family of Panakkad. Shihab Thangal also functioned as the president of the Kerala state committee of the Indian Union Muslim League (1975 - 2009).

According to historian Roland Miller, "wisely and sensitively, he led Muslims through the landmines of state politics for over three decades. He also led the way into cordial relationships with members of other religious communities".

== Early life and education ==
Sayed Muhammad Ali Shihab Thangal was born as the eldest son of P. M. S. A. Ali Shihab Ba Alawi, of the Puthiya Maliyekkal family of Panakkad, on 4 May 1936. His siblings were Umerali Shihab Ba Alawi, Hyderali Shihab Ba Alawi, Sadiq Ali Shihab Ba Alawi, Abbasali Shihab Ba Alawi.

Shihab Thangal had his primary education at Panakkad and at M. M. High School, Kozhikode (matriculation). He also had his initial Islamic education at the traditional 'dars' at Tirur and Kananchery.

=== Higher education in Egypt ===
In 1958, Shihab Thangal left for Egypt for further studies and obtained his master's degree in Arabic Literature from Al-Azhar University in 1961. He continued his studies in Cairo University and pursued a Doctorate in Arabic Literature and Philosophy in 1966.

Shihab Thangal was well versed in English and French. He was also known for his enthusiasm for Sufi-poetry. On return to Kerala, the thangal married Sharifa Fatima Beevi, daughter of Sayed Ba Faqih Thangal.

== Public life ==
Shihab Thangal became the president of the Kerala state committee of Indian Union Muslim League after his father Pukkoya Thangal's death in 1975. He remained president until his own death in 2009. Shihab Thangal is distinctly remembered for his role in preserving communal harmony in Kerala (at the most tense times like demolition of Babur's Mosque in 1992).

Shihab Thangal was also qadi to hundreds of 'mahals' in Kerala. He was the president of numerous educational institutions such as Jamia Nooriya, which were managed by the Samastha. He was behind the proposal to start another campus of Aligarh Muslim University in Kerala.

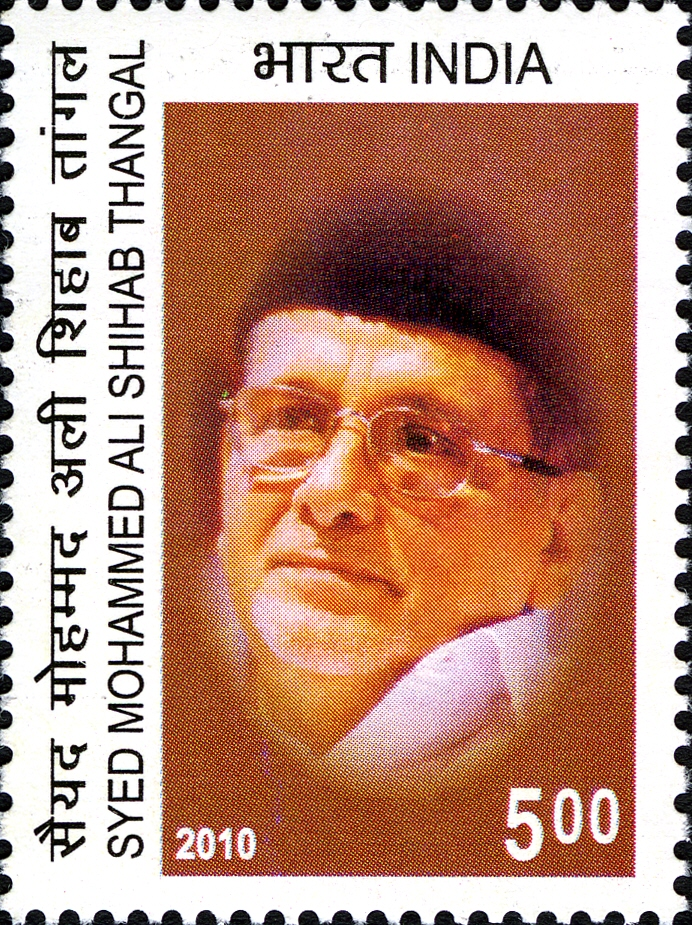
Mohammed Ali Shihab Thangal on a 2010 Indian postage stamp.

Shihab Thangal died on 1 August 2009 following a cardiac arrest.

== See also ==
- Sadiq Ali Shihab Thangal
- Indian Union Muslim League
- Shihab Thangal Charity Trust
