= Sayed Hyder Ali Shihab Thangal =

Muslim community leader, scholar and politician from Kerala (1947–2022)

Habib Hyder Ali AlHusseini Ba Alavi
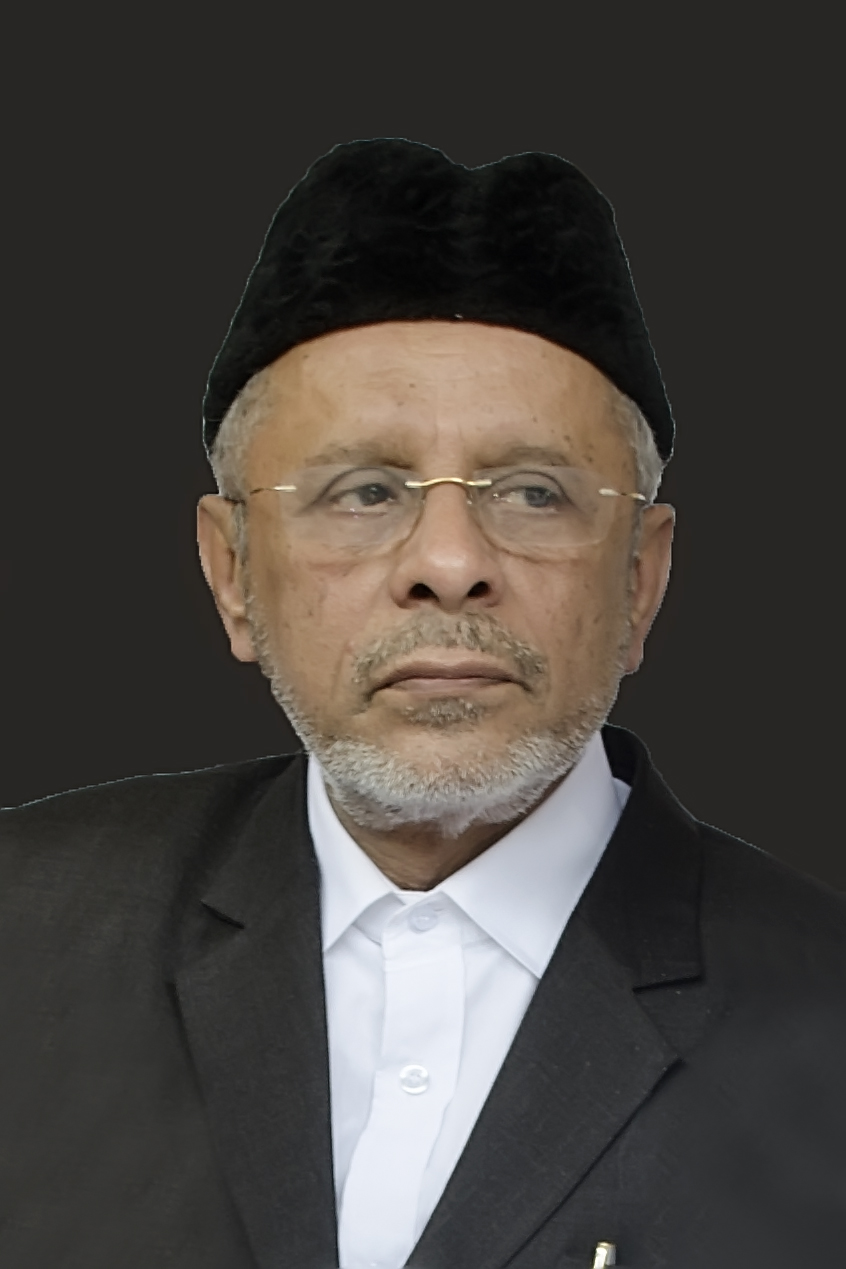
- Habib Hyderali Husseini (2015)

Kerala State President, Indian Union Muslim League
- In office 2009–2022

Chairman, National Political Advisory Committee, Indian Union Muslim League

Vice President, Samastha Kerala Jam'iyyat al-'Ulama'

Personal details
- Born: 15 June 1947 Panakkad, Malabar, British India
- Died: 6 March 2022 (aged 74) Angamaly, Ernakulam
- Party: Indian Union Muslim League
- Relations: Syed Muhammadali Shihab Thangal (brother); Sayed Umerali Shihab Thangal (brother); Sayyid Sadiq Ali Shihab Thangal (brother); Syed Abbas Ali Shihab Thangal (brother)
- Children: Syed Mueen Ali Shihab Thangal Sayyid Naeemali Shihab Thangal
- Parent: PMSA Pookkoya Thangal (father)
- Education: Faizy (Post Graduate, Arabic and Islamic Sharīʿah)
- Alma mater: Jami'a Nooriyya Arabiyya Pattikkad (Perinthalmanna)
- Occupation: Community leader; Islamic scholar; Politician

Panakkad Sayed Hyder Ali Shihab Thangal (15 June 1947 – 6 March 2022) was an Indian Islamic scholar and Thangal community leader from Kerala, southern India who was the Kerala State President and chairman, national political advisory committee, Indian Union Muslim League from 2009 to 2022. He was also the vice president of the Samastha Kerala Jam'iyyat al-'Ulama' (E. K. faction), the principal Sunni-Shafi'i scholarly body in Kerala.

Hyder Ali Thangal was a member of the Pukkoya family of Panakkad (north Kerala). He was the third son of P. M. S. A. Pookkoya Thangal (1913 – 1975) and the younger brother of Sayed Mohammed Ali Shihab Thangal and Sayed Umar Ali Shihab Thangal. He was the founding president of Sunni Students Federation (S. S. F.), the student wing of Samastha Kerala Jam'iyyat al-'Ulama', in 1973. He graduated from Jami'a Nooriyya, Perinthalmanna in 1989. He led the Sunni Yuvajana Sangham (S. Y. S.), the youth wing of the Samastha Kerala Jamiyyathul Ulama, and later served the Malappuram District President, Indian Union Muslim League for around two decades.

Hyder Ali Thangal was elected as the successor to Mohammed Ali Thangal as the Kerala State President of Indian Union Muslim League in 2009. After Pookkoya Thangal, Hyderali Thangal was the only leader to head both the Muslim League and the Samastha Kerala Jamiyyathul Ulama simultaneously. He also served as the chairman of Kerala Wakf Board. He was also the founding chancellor of Darul Huda Islamic University, Chemmad.

He died at the Little Flower Hospital in Angamaly, on 6 March 2022, at the age of 74. Shashi Tharoor, the diplomat-turned-politician, described the Thangal as a "diminutive giant of Kerala politics" as he tweeted about his death.
