= Samastha Kerala Sunni Students Federation =

Student organization in northern Kerala (India)

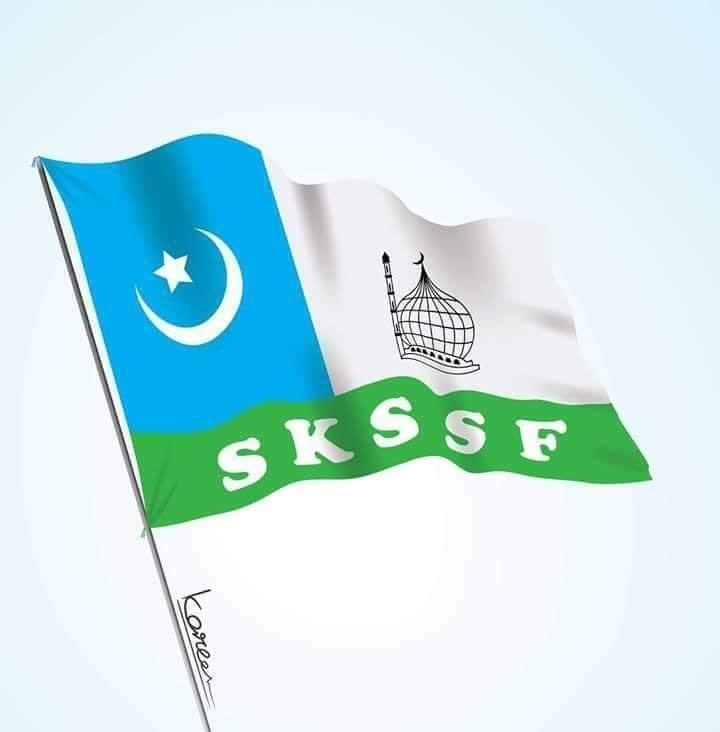
- Flag of Samastha Kerala Sunni Student Federation
- Abbreviation: SKSSF
- Predecessor: KK Aboobacker Hazrath
- Formation: 19 February 1989; 37 years ago
- Founder: C.H Aidarus Musliyar
- Founded at: Kozhikode
- Type: Student organization
- Legal status: Active
- Purpose: Muslim students under its fold to nurture them into a good moral life
- Headquarters: Islamic Centre, Calicut
- Location: India
- Origins: Kerala, India
- Region served: India
- Official language: Arabic Malayalam English
- President: Sayyid Fakhruddin Hasani Thangal Kannanthali
- General Secretary: OPM Ashraf
- Trusurer: Panakkad Sayyid Hashir Ali Shihab Thangal
- Parent organization: Samastha Kerala Jem-iyyathul Ulama
- Website: skssf.in

Samastha Kerala Sunni Students Federation (SKSSF) is the student wing of Samastha Kerala Jem-iyyathul Ulama, scholarly body in Kerala. The largest Islamic students organization of India. The organisation is headquartered at Kozhikode.

== History ==
The Samastha Kerala Sunni Students Federation (SKSSF) is a student organization founded on February 19, 1989, affiliated with the Samastha Kerala Jamiyyathul Ulama. The movement was established at Zamorin High School in Kozhikode, Kerala, emerging in response to ideological divisions that occurred within Samastha during the 1980s.

The founding conference was chaired by K. K. Aboobacker Hazrat and inaugurated by K. V. Mohammad Musliar Koottanad. The organization's name was officially announced by C. H. Hydros. The inaugural event was attended by several prominent Islamic scholars, including Samastha Examination Board Chairman C. H. Hydros, K. T. Manu Musliar, and Natika V. Moosa Musliar.

Ashraf Faizy Kannadipparambu and Abdul Hameed Faizy Ambalakkadavu served as the organization's first president and secretary, respectively. Panakkad Sayyid Sadiq Ali Shihab Thangal, the current president of the Indian Union Muslim League (IUML), is among the notable past presidents of the SKSSF.

=== Samastha Centenary Celebration 2026 ===
In February 2026, SKSSF participated in the centenary celebrations of the Samastha Kerala Jami'yyathul Ulama marking 100 years since the organizations establishment in 1926, the concluding international conference was held from 4 - 8 February 2026 at Kuniya Kasaragod, Kerala, As the student wing of Samastha, SKSSF coordinated students volunteers and organized educational and cultural Serviece related activities during the centenary programme's, The event brought together religious scholars, students and delegates from India and abroad, and featured conference and seminars, exhibitions and public gathering commemorating the organizations cemetery long contribution to Islamic education and community services

== Organs ==
- Magazine — Sathyadhara
- Voluntary wing — Viqaya
- Students Union — Twalaba
- Humanitarian agency — Sahachari
- Education and Career - Trend
- Campus Wing
- Worship and Faith - Ibad Wing
- Isthiqama:
- Maneesha
- Organet
- Arts wing - Sargalaya
- Media wing - Cyber Wing
- Meem:Doctors wing

== See also ==
- Sunni Students' Federation
- Kerala State Muslim Students Federation
