= Pukkoya Thangal =

Indian community leader and politician

Sayyid P. M. S. A. Pukkoya Thangal (Ahmad al-Shihabuddin Ba Alawi)
- P. M. S. A. Pukkoya Thangal
- Born: 20 January 1913
- Died: 6 July 1975 (aged 62)
- Occupations: Muslim spiritual or community leader; Islamic scholar; Politician

Sayyid Ahmad al-Shihabuddin Ba Alawi, or P. M. S. A. Pukkoya Thangal, (20 January 1913 – 6 July 1975) of the Pukkoya family of Panakkad, South Malabar, was an Indian sayyid (thangal) community leader and Indian Union Muslim League politician from Kerala. He was born in 1913 as the son of Sayyid Husain Shihabudden al-Hussaini Ba Alavi. He served as the Kerala State President, Indian Union Muslim League and the Vice President of Samastha Kerala Jem'iyyat al-'Ulama' (the body of Sunni-Shafi'i scholars in Kerala).

Sayyid Ahmad Al-Shihabuddin was born in the Yemeni-Hadhrami origin Pukkoya family which originates from the family al-Shihabuddin, one of houses of the Ba Alawi clan who are descendants from Husayn bin Ali, the grandson of Prophet Muhammad.

Pukkoya Thangal was succeeded by his eldest son Syed Muhammed Ali Shihab Thangal (1936–2009).
