= List of mosques in Kerala =

List of mosques in India

This is a list of mosques in Kerala, India.

Name	Images	City	District	Year	Notes
Central Mahallu Juma Masjid		Muvattupuzha	Ernakulam	1346 AH (1927/1928 CE)	
Chempittapally		Mattancherry, Kochi	Ernakulam	16th century	
Cheraman Juma Mosque		Kodungallur	Thrissur	629 CE	Claimed oldest mosque in India
Edappally Juma Mosque		Edappally, Kochi	Ernakulam	c. 20th century	
Kambalakkad Juma Mosque		Kambalakkad	Wayanad district		
Varambatta juma Masjid		Varambatta Vellamunda Gram Panchayat	Wayanad district		one of the oldest masjid in Wayanad district,
Kolloorvila Juma Mosque		Pallimukku	Kollam		
Madayi Mosque		Pazhayangadi	Kannur	518 AH (1124/1125CE)	
Malik Dinar Mosque		Thalangara	Kasaragod	22 AH (642/643CE)	Remodelled in 2018
Mampuram Mosque		Tirurangadi	Malappuram		
Maqam Masjid			Alappuzha	mid-19th century	
Mishkal Mosque		Kuttichira	Kozhikode	14th century	
Misri Masjid		Ponnani	Malappuram	16th century	
Muchundi Mosque		Kuttichira	Kozhikode	13th century	
Nellikunnu Muhyaddin Juma Masjid		Nellikunnu	Kasaragod	Before 7th century	
Odathil Mosque		Thalassery	Kannur	c. 1806	
Palayam Juma Mosque		Palayam	Thiruvananthapuram	1813	
Ponnani Juma Masjid		Ponnani	Malappuram	925 AH (1518/1520CE)	
Juma Mosque, Pullancheri		Pullancheri, Manjeri	Malappuram	c. 1920	
Saukar Masjid			Alappuzha	1850	
Shahre Mubarak Grand Mosque (also known as Jamiul Futuh)		Markaz Knowledge City	Kozhikode	2022	
Tahir Mosque, Payangadi		Payangadi	Kannur	2008	
Thazhathangady Juma Mosque		Thazhathangady	Kottayam	824 CE	

== See also ==
- List of the oldest mosques
