= Architecture of Alappuzha =

Architecture in Kerala, India

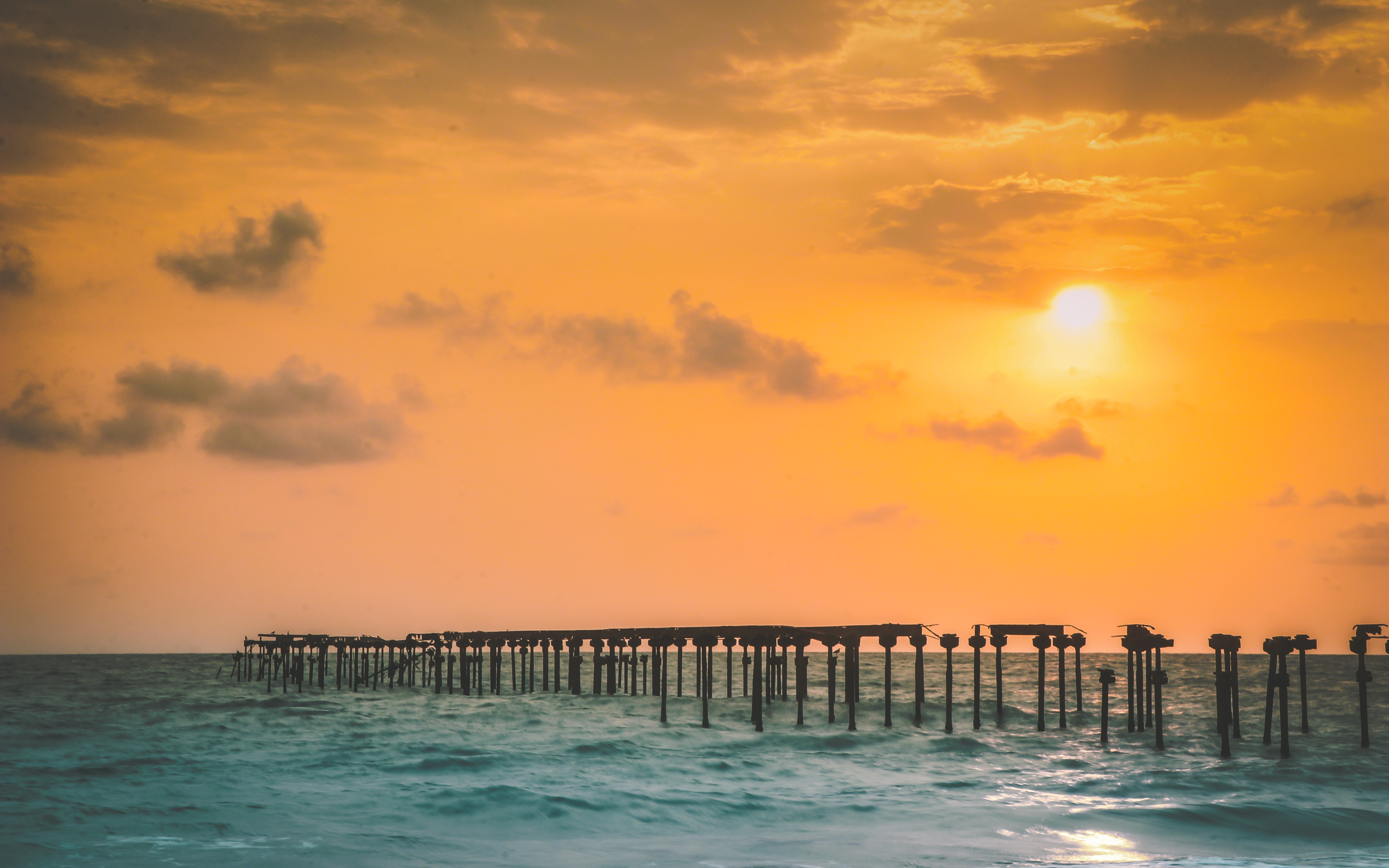
Pier at Alappuzha beach

The architecture in Alappuzha (formerly known as Alleppey, a port town in Kerala, India) is influenced by a combination of regional styles, particularly of the Travancore kingdom, as well as by the role of the town itself as a centre of trade. The town is built along two parallel canals (the Commercial canal and the Vadai Canal) that were used to transport goods. The nature of the town as a port but also a melting pot of culture created a syncretic architecture style that was unique to each of the communities who came to settle in the area.

== History ==
Raja Kesava Das, the Diwan for Travancore at the time, was the one who developed Alleppey port in 1762. The town was meant to function as the centre of trade for the Kingdom, ensuring that Travancore needn’t depend on any other means of import/export.

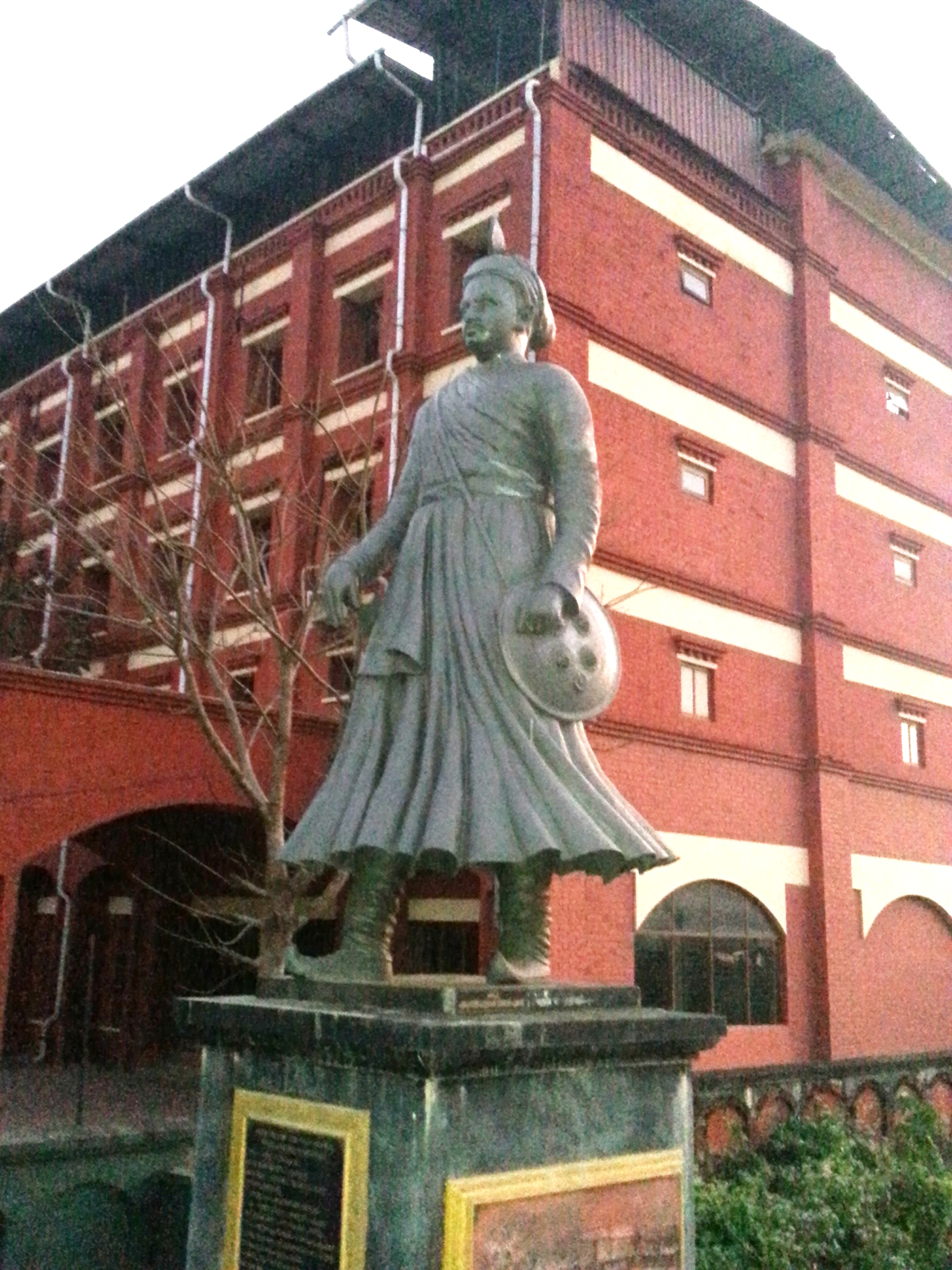
Raja Kesava Das Statue in Alleppey

In his efforts to build Alappuzha, Raja Kesava Das invited people from various places in the subcontinent, for their expertise in what he thought necessary to make Alappuzha a success. He brought in communities like Baniyas and Marwaris, who were well known for their capabilities in trade, as well as several Gujarati families, for example – his efforts were fruitful in that Alappuzha became somewhat cosmopolitan in its design. Each of these communities were allotted places to live, which resulted in certain areas in Alleppey, such as the ‘Gujarati Street’, having a distinct style in its construction.

Alappuzha by nature of its trade-centric conception, is an incredibly architecturally diverse town as the communities who came to settle in Alleppey also brought along with them the styles and construction that they were used to. These then adapted to the locally available materials and styles, creating syncretic architecture.

== Factors influencing architecture ==
For more information, see the page on the Architecture of Kerala

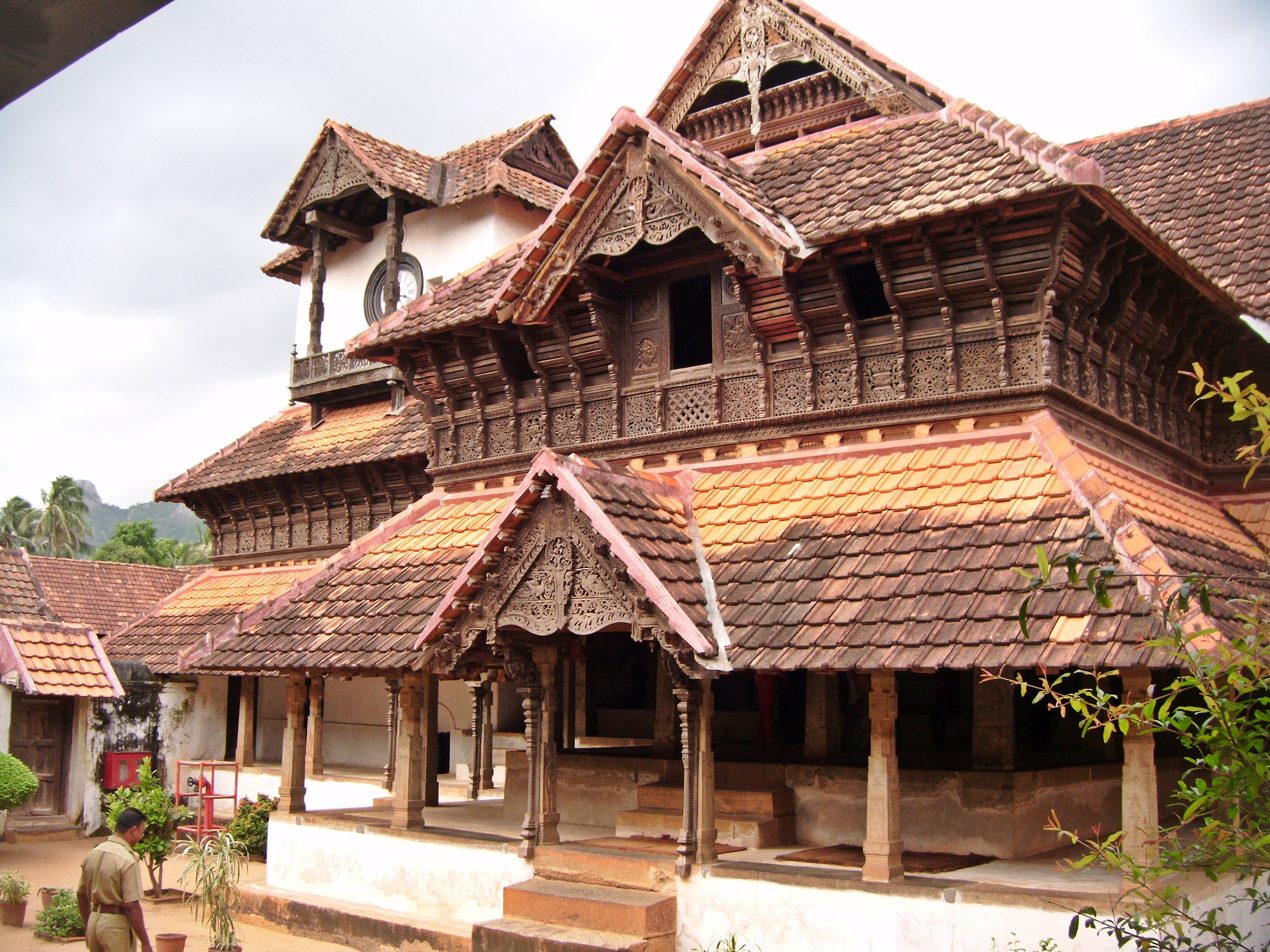
Traditional features of Kerala architecture with prominent roofs and woodwork

The region experiences monsoons and high temperatures, resulting in a climate that is humid, with heavy rains. The architecture indigenous to the region is primarily influenced by the weather, as well as resources that are available in the area itself. The construction of most buildings was done with these local resources – wood, for example, is a common material used in both temple architecture and in homes. In terms of architecture following the needs of the regions, roofs are prominent feature of the state’s architecture, predominantly gabled, and are a result of the need for houses to be resilient against the rains that come during the monsoon.

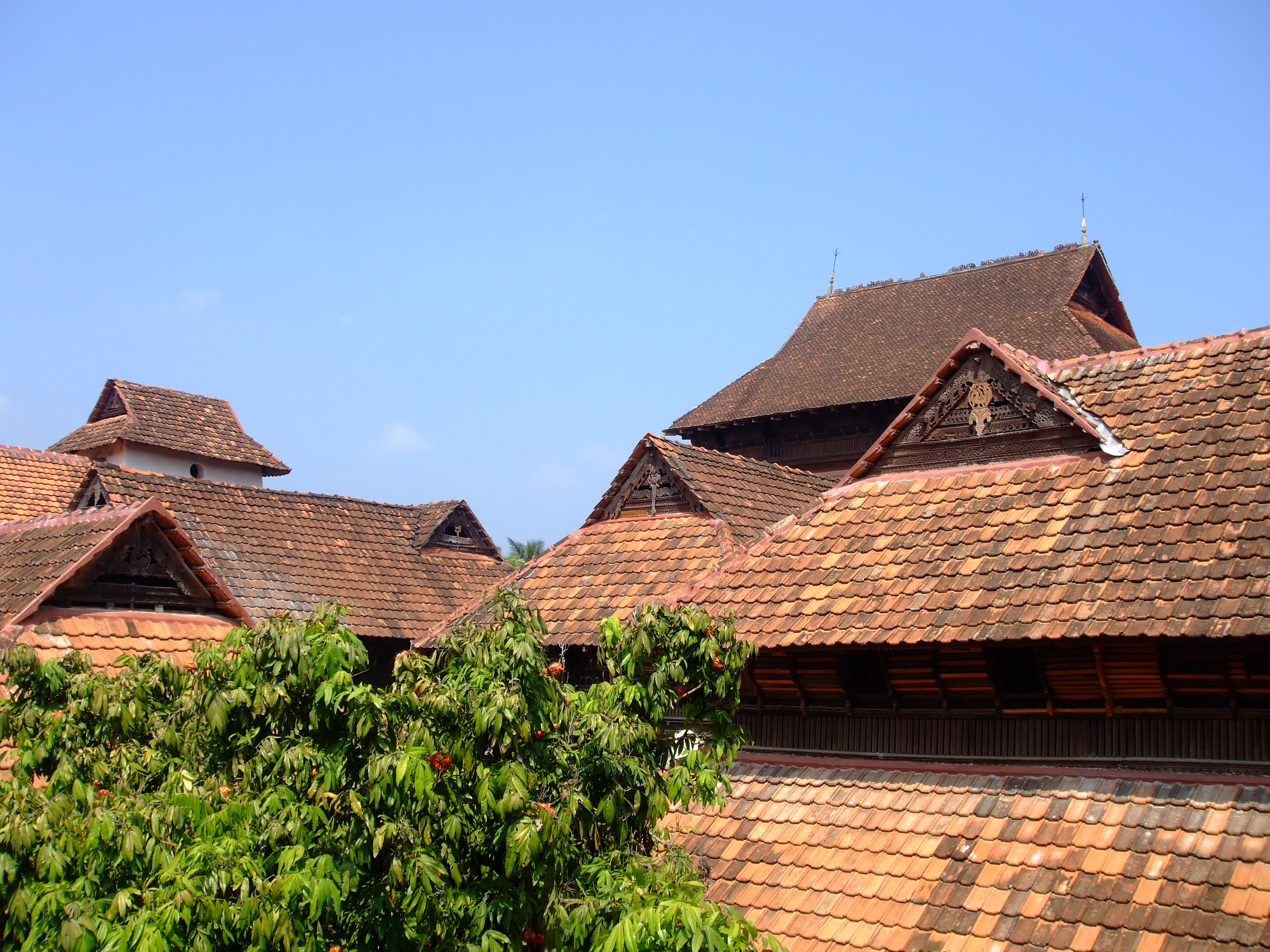
The gabled roof and ceiling are a prime feature of the Kerala architectural style.

In Alappuzha, some buildings that are otherwise not deriving from the local architecture style will still have the gabled Kerala-style roof, indicating that the practicality of the roof took priority over typical construction.

== Prominent Examples ==
=== The Canals ===
The Canals in Alleppey are its most iconic feature, and part of the reason why it has the moniker “the Venice of the East”. The town has two parallel canals running through it, with over 34 bridges. The Vadai canal was the first to be constructed, and was intended to be a moat, while the Commercial canal was built explicitly for the use of trade, for transporting goods from the port towards various warehouses along them. Several initiatives are being undertaken to ensure the canals are being cleaned, focusing on waste cleaning as well as clearing out invasive plant species that have choked the canals for many years.

=== Mosques in Alappuzha ===
There are several mosques in Alappuzha, of which the most well-known are the Saukar Masjid and the Maqam Masjid. The Maqam Juma Masjid is a well-known Muslim Pilgrimage site in Kerala, as well as being one of the oldest in the region. It draws on both Islamic architecture and the local traditional styles, with the roofs in particular emerging as a defining feature of the Mosque, as it is a departure from the style of constructing one. Saukar Masjid, similarly, uses a combination of styles and was built by the Halayi Momens from Gujarat, who were given the plot of land by Raja Kesava Das. This mosque sits on the banks of the Commercial Canal, and used to be painted a bright blue, before the being repainted white as part of the restoration efforts from the Alappuzha Heritage Project.

=== Gujarati Street ===
A street that is located near the Commercial Canal, this area is where the Gujarati community of Alappuzha has lived since the town’s start as a port. It is home to the Swetambar Jain Temple, which is considered to have helped in the spread of Jainism in South India.

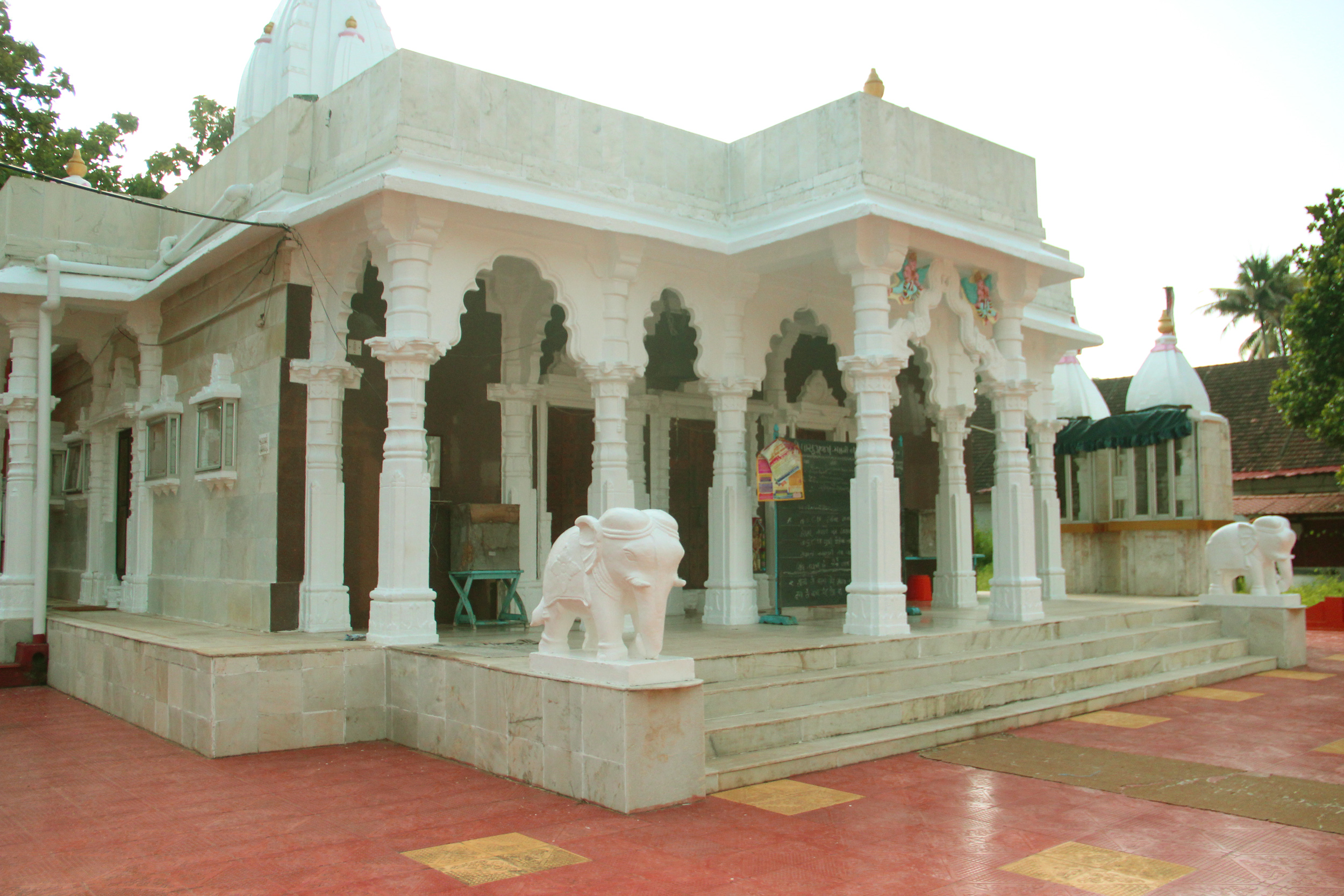
Jain-temple-alleppey

The structures here have Gujarati motifs decorating doors and rafters, setting the buildings apart from other areas in the town. Efforts are being made to preserve the street’s architecture by the Government of Kerala, along with plans to create a heritage museum.

== Conservation and the Alappuzha Heritage Project ==
In 2020, the Left Democratic Front (LDF) government announced that a project would be undertaken in Alappuzha to conserve the city’s architecture by creating museums and by doing renovations and upkeep on several of the iconic structures. The Chief Minister, Pinarayi Vijayan, is quoted saying “Alappuzha lost its glory owing to lack of civic sense” and that the project aims to return Alappuzha to its previous glory.

The government invested over ₹200 crore in the project, with intentions to foster Alleppey as a centre for cultural tourism. It aims to work on 20 museums, 11 memorials and 5 public places, through renovations and restorations. This includes work done to clean out the canals.

The project, however, has been slow moving – only a few of the promised renovations have been executed, and residents have been left in the dark as well. As of 2022, work has only been done on Saukar Masjid, a Miyawaki forest, Phase 1 of canal rejuvenation and the port museum building, some of which were originally completed in 2020.
