= Juma Mosque, Pullancheri =

Mosque in Manjeri, Kerala, India

Juma Mosque
- Location of the mosque in Kerala

Religion
- Affiliation: Islam
- Ecclesiastical or organisational status: Mosque
- Status: Active

Location
- Location: Pullancheri, Manjeri, Malappuram district, Kerala
- Country: India
- Coordinates: 11°05′40″N 76°08′49″E

Architecture
- Type: Mosque architecture
- Completed: c. 1920

The Juma Mosque, also known as the Pullancheri Juma Masjid (Bengali: জুমা মসজিদ, পুল্লানচেরি; Arabic: مسجد الجمعة بولانشيري), is a Friday mosque, located in the village of Pullancheri, near the town of Manjeri, in the Malappuram district of the state of Kerala, India. The mosque was built in the 1920s.

There are five srambis under the mosque. The mosque is governed by the Hidayathul Islam Sangham Committee, whose president is Sayed Hyderali Shihab Thangal of Panakkad. The mosque administers the Nusrathul Islam Madrasa.

== See also ==
- Islam in India
- List of mosques in India
- List of mosques in Kerala
