= Edappally Juma Mosque =

Mosque in Edappally, Kochi, Kerala, India

- ഇടപ്പള്ളി മഹല്ലു ജുമാ മസ്ജിദ്
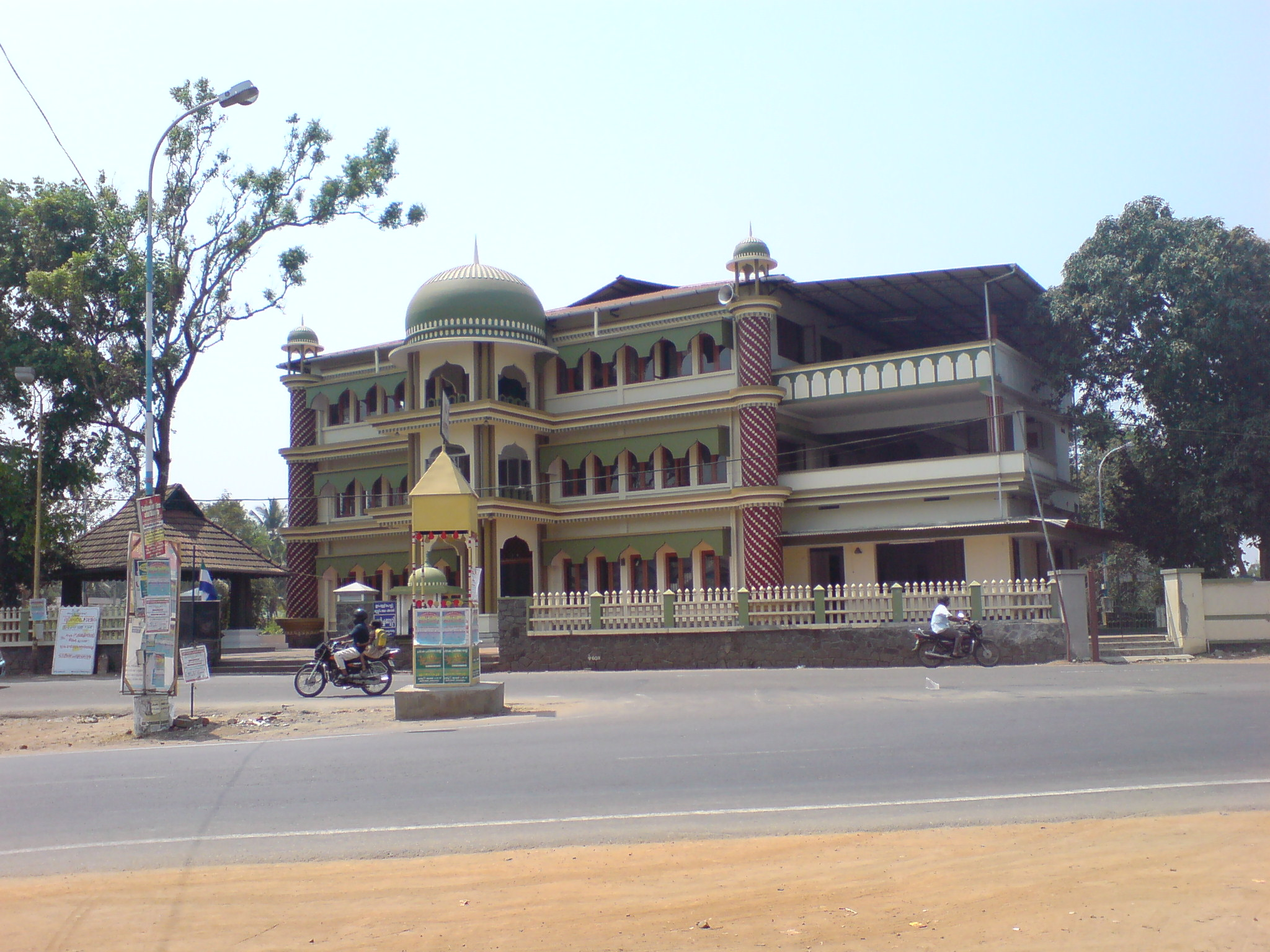
- The mosque, in 2009

- Location of the mosque in Kerala

Religion
- Affiliation: Islam
- Ecclesiastical or organizational status: Friday mosque
- Status: Active

Location
- Location: Old Cheranalllur Road, Edappally, Kerala
- Country: India
- Interactive map of Edappally Juma Mosque
- Coordinates: 10°01′36″N 76°18′21″E

Architecture
- Type: Mosque architecture

Specifications
- Dome: One
- Materials: Concrete; marble

Website
- jamaath.com

The Edappally Juma Mosque (Malayalam: ഇടപ്പള്ളി മഹല്ലു ജുമാ മസ്ജിദ്), also known as the Edappally Mahallu Juma Masjid, is a Friday mosque, located in Edappally, Kochi, in the state of Kerala, India. The mosque is situated on Old Cheranalllur Road, in Edappally.

== Overview ==
The Portuguese army attacked the mosque during their rule in India to catch the Muslim freedom fighters. One of the great Islamic scholars, Edappally Usthad K.P. Aboobacker Moulavi, led the dars in Edappally for 42 years.

There are seven Friday mosques and five non-Friday mosques, twelve madrasas, and a community hall, located with the Edappally congregational administration.

== See also ==
- Islam in India
- List of mosques in India
- List of mosques in Kerala
