= Kolloorvila Juma Mosque =

Mosque in Kerala, India

- Location of the mosque in Kerala

Religion
- Affiliation: Islam
- Ecclesiastical or organizational status: Mosque
- Status: Active

Location
- Location: Pallimukku, Kollam district, Kerala
- Country: India
- Interactive map of Kolloorvila Juma Mosque
- Coordinates: 8°52′30″N 76°37′29″E

Architecture
- Type: Mosque architecture
- Capacity: more than 5,000 worshippers

The Kolloorvila Juma Mosque, also known as the Kolloorvila Juma Masjid, is a Friday mosque situated at Pallimukku, 4 kilometres (2.5 mi) from Kollam city centre, in the state of Kerala, India.

The mosque is one of the largest mosques in Kerala and can accommodate more than 5,000 worshippers. This mosque is one of the top pilgrims praying mosques in kerala. Kolloorvila juma masjid has the most number of population in kerala in terms of membership.

== See also ==
- Islam in India
- List of mosques in India
- List of mosques in Kerala
