= Thazhathangady Juma Mosque =

Mosque in Kottayam district, Kerala, India

Thazhathangady Juma Masjid
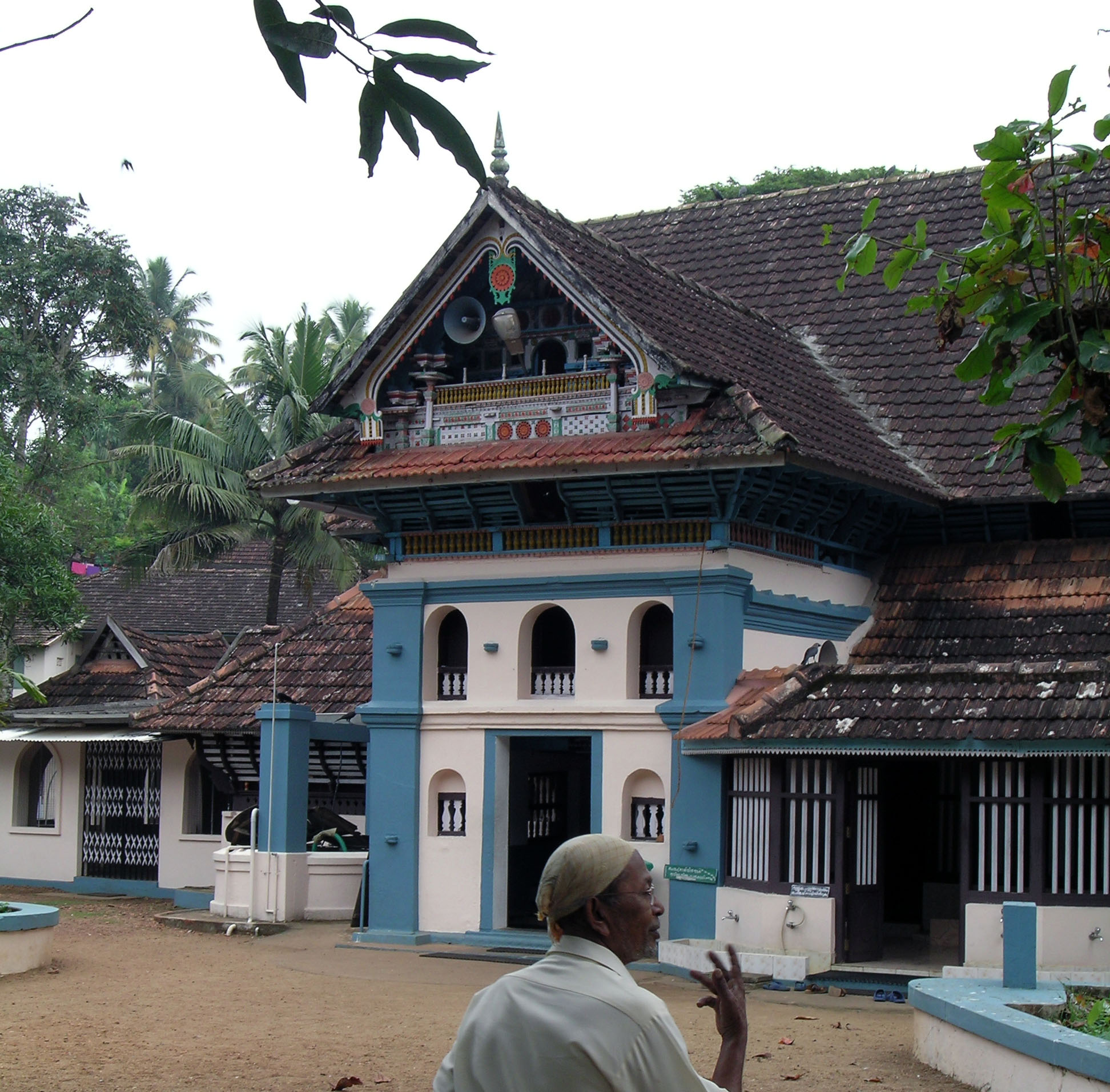
- Entrance to the mosque in 2005

- Location of the mosque in Kerala

Religion
- Affiliation: Islam
- Ecclesiastical or organisational status: Mosque
- Leadership: Shafeek mannani (Chief imam); Sadaqathullah Adany (Assistant imam)
- Status: Active

Location
- Location: Thazhathangady, Kottayam, Kerala
- Country: India
- Coordinates: 9°35′55″N 76°30′20″E

Architecture
- Type: Mosque architecture
- Style: Thachu shastra
- Founder: Habib Dinar (son of Malik Dinar)
- Completed: 824 CE; 2012 (expansion)

Specifications
- Length: 15 m (50 ft)
- Width: 13 m (42 ft)
- Interior area: 390 m^{2} (4,200 sq ft)
- Height (max): 11 m (35 ft) (excludes minarets)
- Minaret: Two
- Inscriptions: One (maybe more)
- Materials: Teak; red stone; iron; clay; aluminium

Website
- tmcf.in

The Thazhathangady Juma Masjid is a mosque situated in Thazhathangady, (Note: Sometimes spelled as Thazhathangadi.) in the district of Kottayam, in one of the heritage zones of the state of Kerala, India, The mosque is located adjacent to the Meenachil River. Completed in c. 824 CE, the mosque is one of the oldest mosques in India.

== Overview ==
Built in c. 824 CE by Habib Dinarm, a son (Note: Or maybe nephew.) of Malik Dinar, (Note: Legend records that the mosque was built by the King of Thekkumkur. However, the Kingdom was extant between 1103 and 1750 CE; meaning that the legend is unlikely to be true.) the mosque is renowned for its beautiful thachu shastra style architecture, as well as its craftsmanship, including intricate teak wooden carvings, a secret passageway, and a 2,000-litre (440 imp gal; 530 US gal) water tank carved out of a single block of stone, used for wudu.

The two-storeyed mansion is 11 metres (35 ft) high with an internal area of 390 square metres (4,200 sq ft). Inscriptions from Quranic verses have been carved in timber, and there are carvings on the teak minbar. In 2012, the southern half of the mosque was demolished and extended with iron pillars, aluminium sheets and minars. A sundial (nizhal khadikaram), located in the mosque courtyard, is used to determine the time for worship.

The mosque opened its doors for women devotees in 2019. "Muslim women in the right attire can enter the mosque only on the two days, April 24 and May 8, as decided by the committee," said Moulavi Sirajjuddeen Hasni, the chief imam.

== Gallery ==
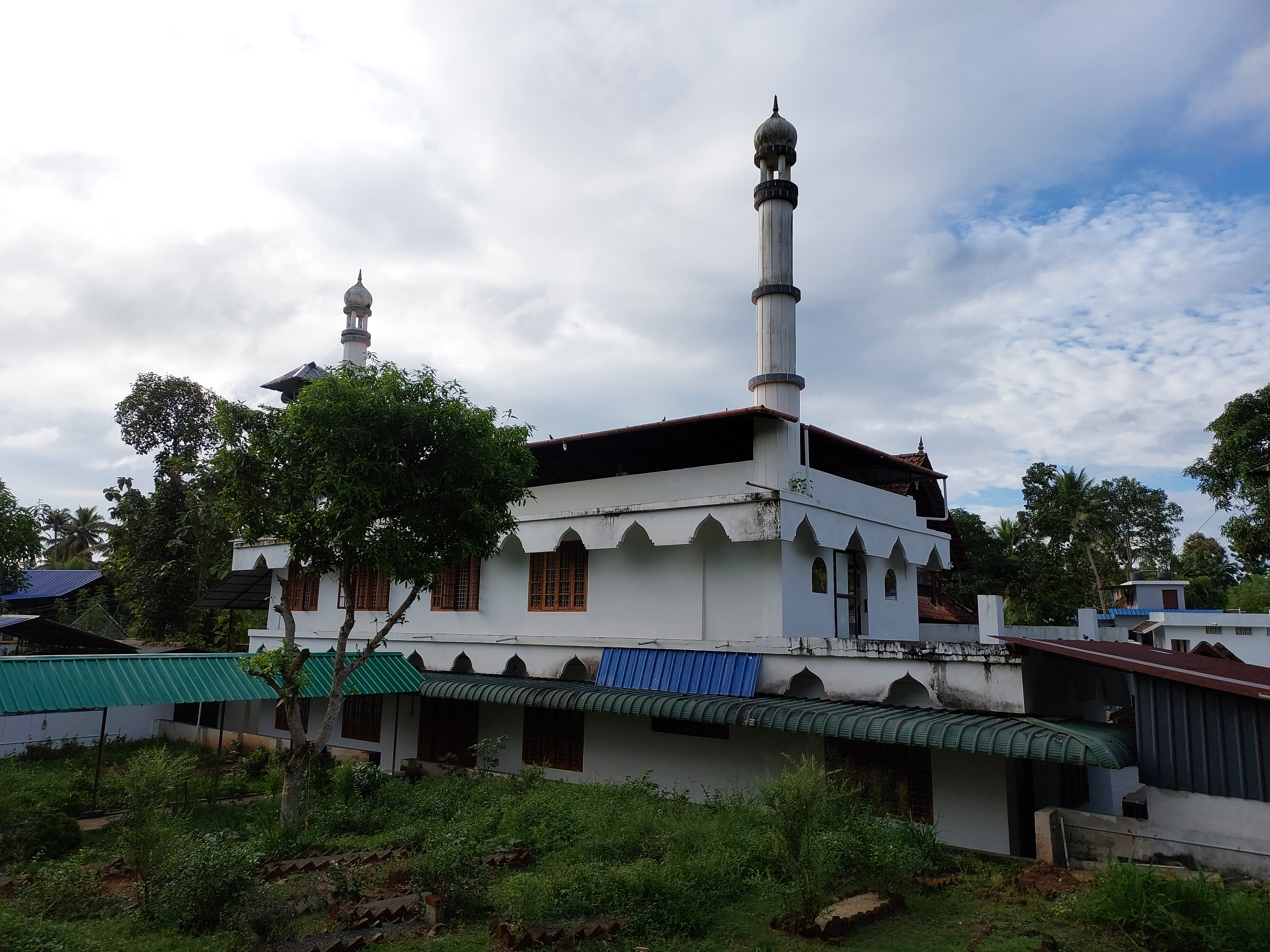
View from the south with the added minarets

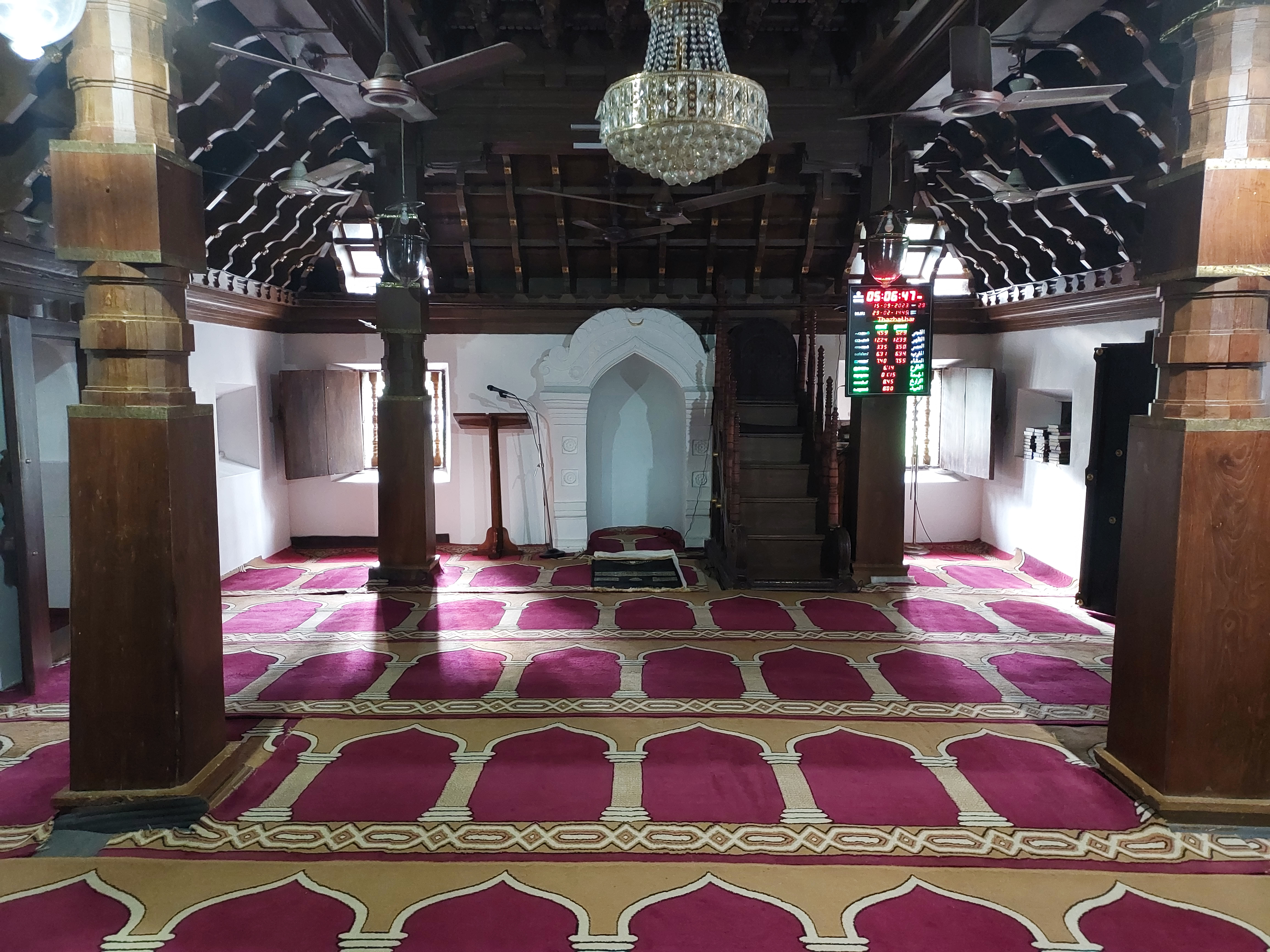
Interior prayer hall in 2023

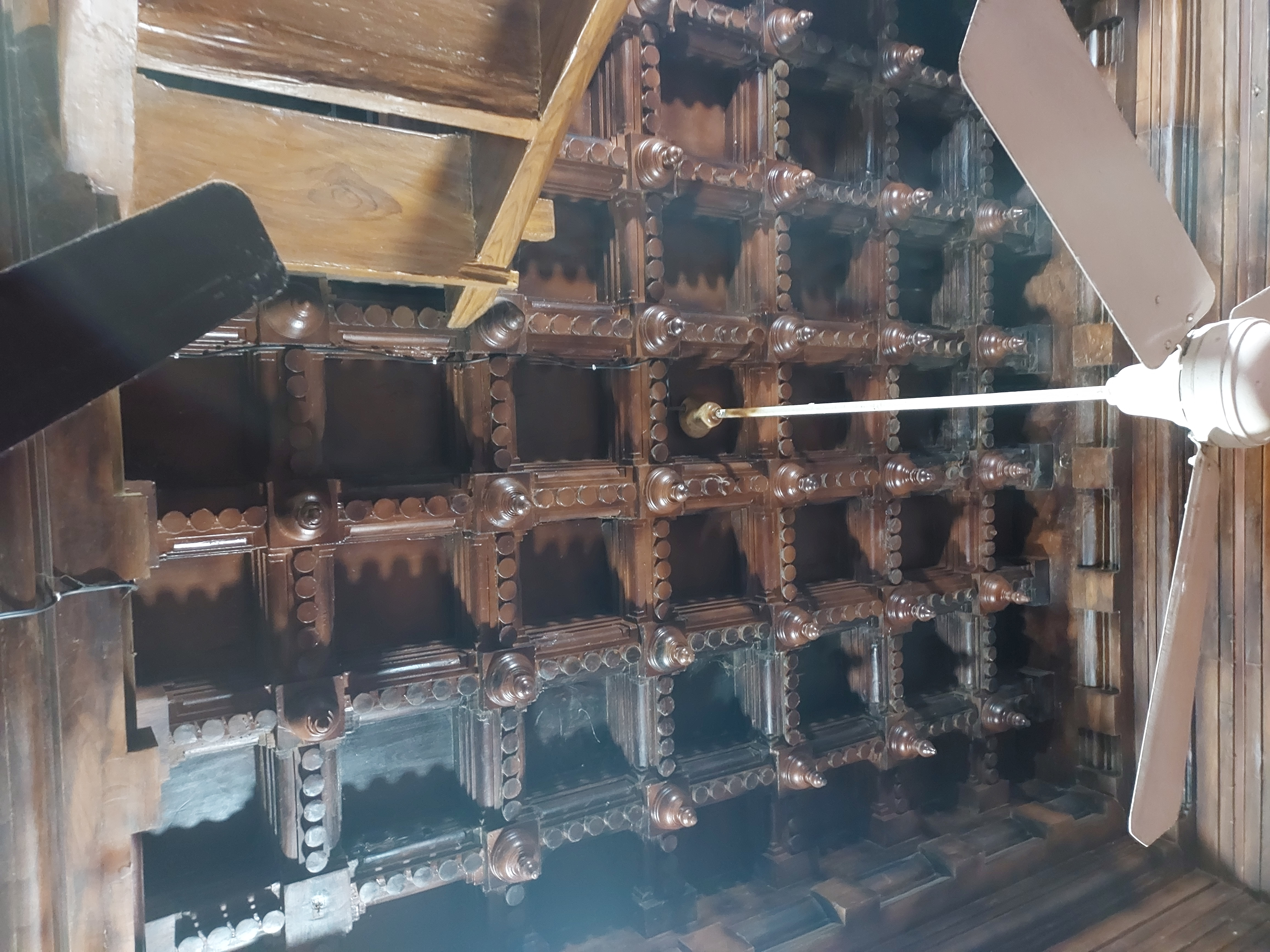
Wooden carving in the ceiling

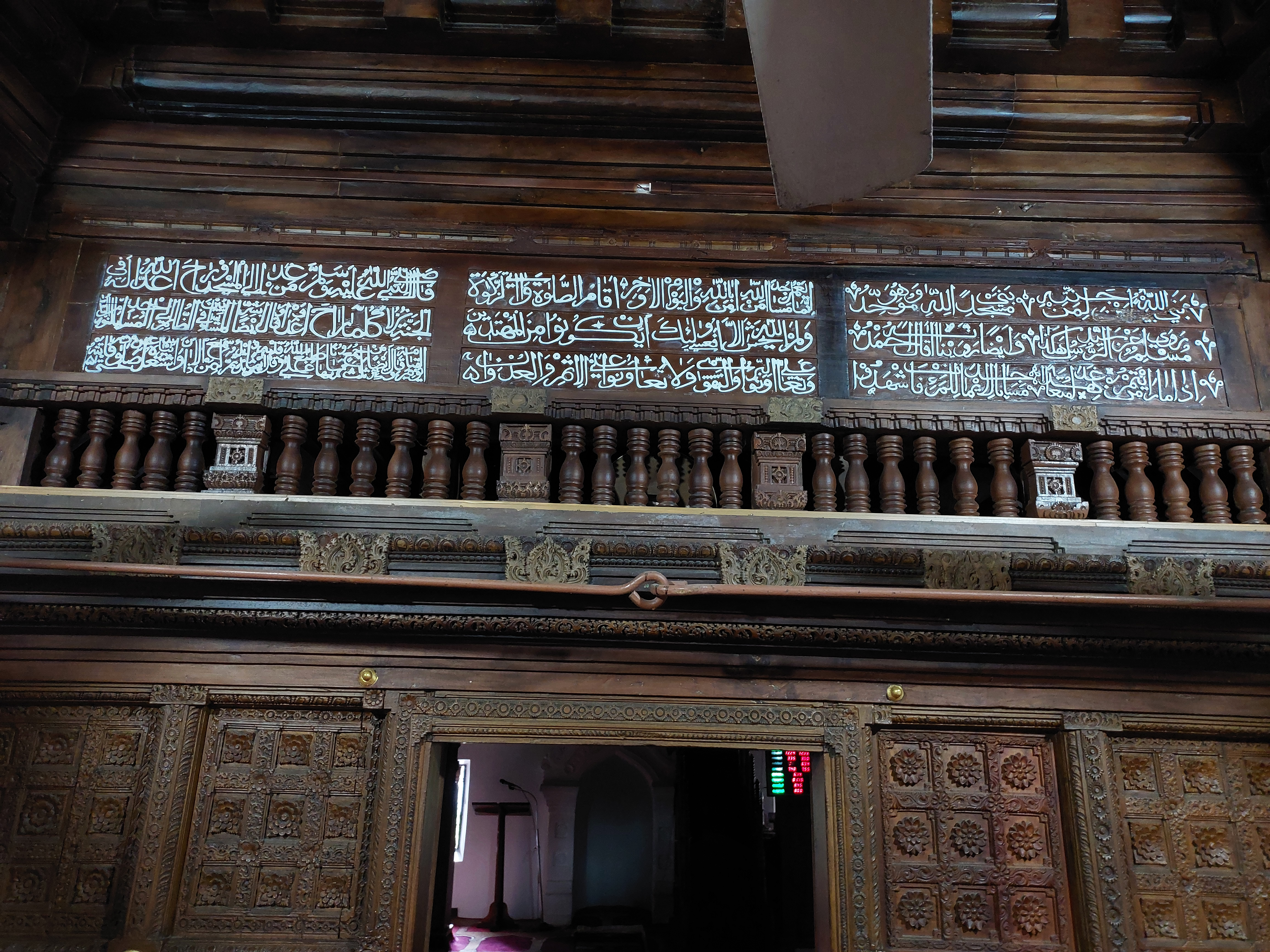
Inscription and wooden carving in panels

The sundial in the courtyard

== See also ==
- Islam in India
- List of mosques in India
- List of mosques in Kerala
- List of oldest mosques in India
