= Misri Masjid =

Mosque in Ponnani, India

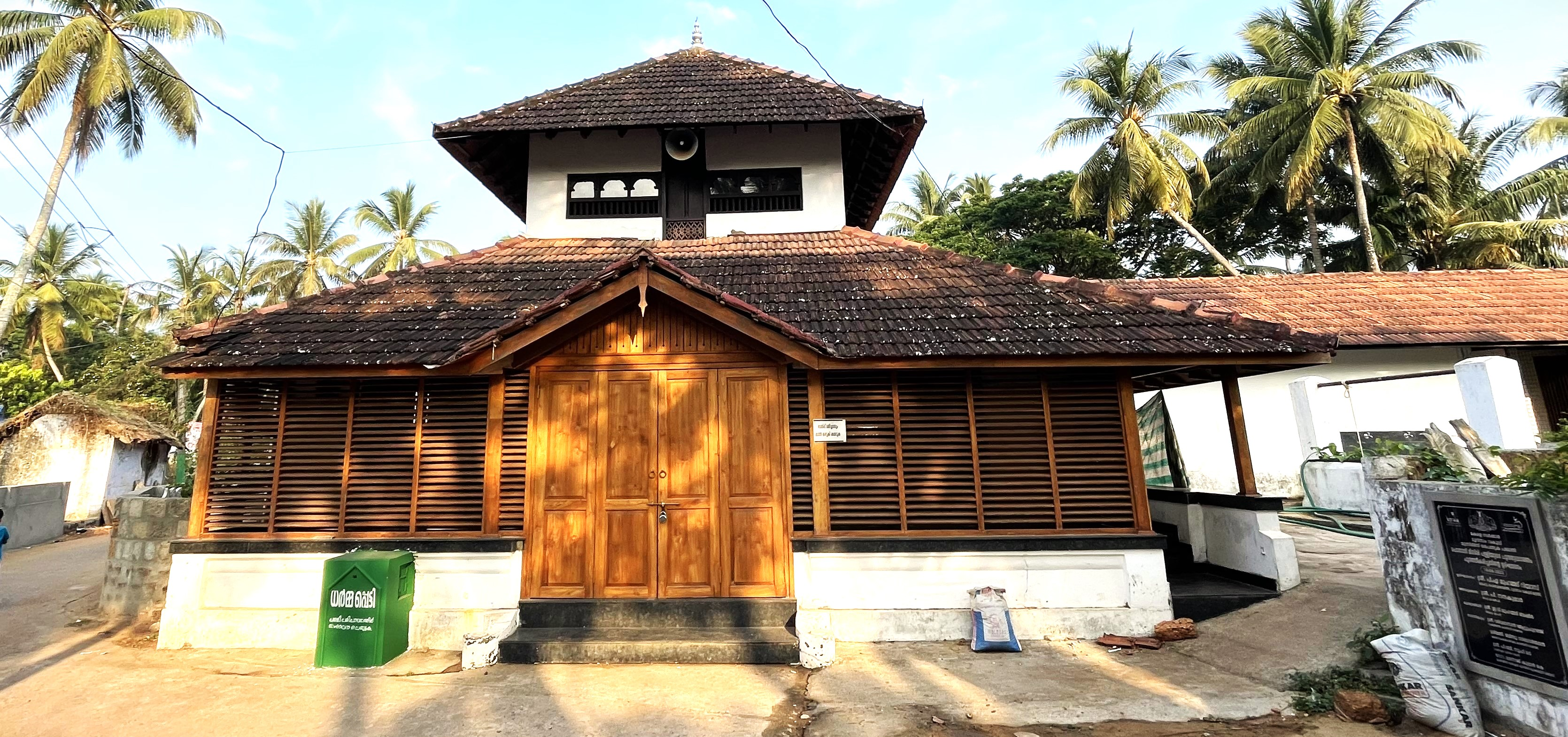
- The mosque in 2024, following restoration

- Location of the mosque in Kerala

Religion
- Affiliation: Islam
- Ecclesiastical or organizational status: Mosque
- Status: Active

Location
- Location: Ponnani, Malappuram district, Kerala
- Country: India
- Interactive map of Misri Masjid
- Coordinates: 10°46′40″N 75°55′21″E

Architecture
- Type: Mosque architecture
- Style: Kerala-Islamic
- Completed: 16th century

The Misri Masjid, also known as the Egyptian Mosque, is a 16th-century mosque, located in Ponnani, in the Malappuram district of the state of Kerala, India. The mosque was built for the army of Zainuddin Makhdoom, who had come to India from Egypt to help the Zamorin king's army in the battle against the Portuguese. The mosque is one of the important cultural, historical and architectural monuments of Kerala. The Misri Masjid is also a remnant of the medieval trade relationship between Egypt and Malabar coast.

== Etymology ==
Because the Egyptians were locally called Misri, people started calling the mosque built in the area where they camped as Misri Masjid.

== History ==
Zainuddin Makhdoom's army had come from Egypt to help the Zamorin king's army in the battle against the Portuguese at Ponnani, which was the headquarters of the Zamorin's navy, headed by Kunjali Marakkar. The Misri Masjid was built for the Makhdoom's army, as mentioned in Tuhfat Ul Mujahideen by Zainuddin Makhdoom. As a tribute to the Egyptian soldiers, the Kammalikanakam family of Ponnani donated land to build the mosque and named it Misri [Egyptian] Masjid. T. V. Abdurrahiman Kutty of Ponnani, an historian, stated that Zamorin, Zainuddin and Marakkar former an army that successfully resisted multiple attacks from the Portuguese.

Another claim exists that the Misri Masjid was built following the visit of traders from Egypt. It was claimed that they came ashore after a shipwreck and promised to build a mosque in gratitude.

The mosque consists of a two-storeyed mihrab, mimbar, prayer hall, and dars, and was built in the Kerala-Islamic style, using local technology and architecture. Many small mosques, madrasas, and ancestral houses were also built in Ponnani and they greatly influenced the socio-cultural life of the town. The Ponnani Juma Masjid was completed in a similar style around the same time.

== Architecture ==
Completed in the 16th-century, the mosque is rich in Arabic calligraphy. The tombs of the soldiers who were martyred in the battle against Portuguese are in the Misri Mosque and in an adjacent mosque. The Misri Masjid contains the tombs of many martyrs of the Indian freedom struggle. The Misri Mosque is also a remnant of the medieval trade relationship between Egypt and Malabar Coast.

Due to lack of care and maintenance, in 2023 it was reported that the mosque suffered extensive damage and its façade and roof collapsed. following this, In 2019, a few members of the mosque committee tried to demolish the old mosque building and replace it with a concrete structure. However, opposition from locals led to the intervention of P. Sreeramakrishnan, the former Speaker of the Kerala Legislative Assembly. To support the community's demand to protect the mosque, the Government of Kerala assumed management of the mosque. Sreeramakrishnan, the MLA for Ponnani, later summoned Archaeological Survey of India officials, including conservation, heritage and architectural experts, to submit a plan for the protection of the monument.

The renovation was completed at a cost of ₹ 85 lakh (approximately US$100,000), under the Muziris Heritage Conservation Project by Government of Kerala. The restoration works were completed in June 2023 in the Kerala-Islamic style. The renovated mosque was opened by P. A. Mohammed Riyas, the Kerala Minister for Public Works Department and Tourism.

== See also ==
- Islam in India
- List of mosques in India
- List of mosques in Kerala
- Egypt–India relations
