= Tahir Mosque, Payangadi =

Mosque in Payangadi, Kannur, Kerala, India

Tahir Mosque
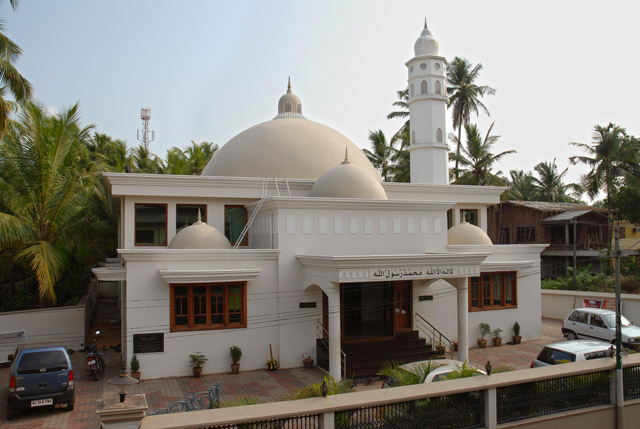

- Location of the mosque in Kerala

Religion
- Affiliation: Ahmadiyya
- Ecclesiastical or organizational status: Mosque
- Status: Active

Location
- Location: Payangadi, Kannur, Kerala
- Country: India
- Interactive map of Tahir Mosque
- Coordinates: 12°1′0″N 75°15′35″E

Architecture
- Type: Mosque architecture
- Style: Modernism
- Groundbreaking: July 1919
- Completed: 2008

Specifications
- Capacity: 700 worshippers
- Dome: Four
- Minaret: One

The Tahir Mosque is an Ahmadiyya mosque located in Payangadi, in the Kannur district, in the state of Kerala, India. The foundation stone was laid in July 1919 by Hadhrat Maulana Gulam Rasool Rajeki sahib.

The mosques includes prayer halls for men and women, administration offices, multi-purpose rooms, and wash-room facilities.

== See also ==
- Islam in India
- List of mosques in India
- List of mosques in Kerala
- Ahmadiyya
