= Nellikunnu Muhyaddin Juma Masjid =

Mosque in Kerala, India

Muhyaddin Juma Masjid
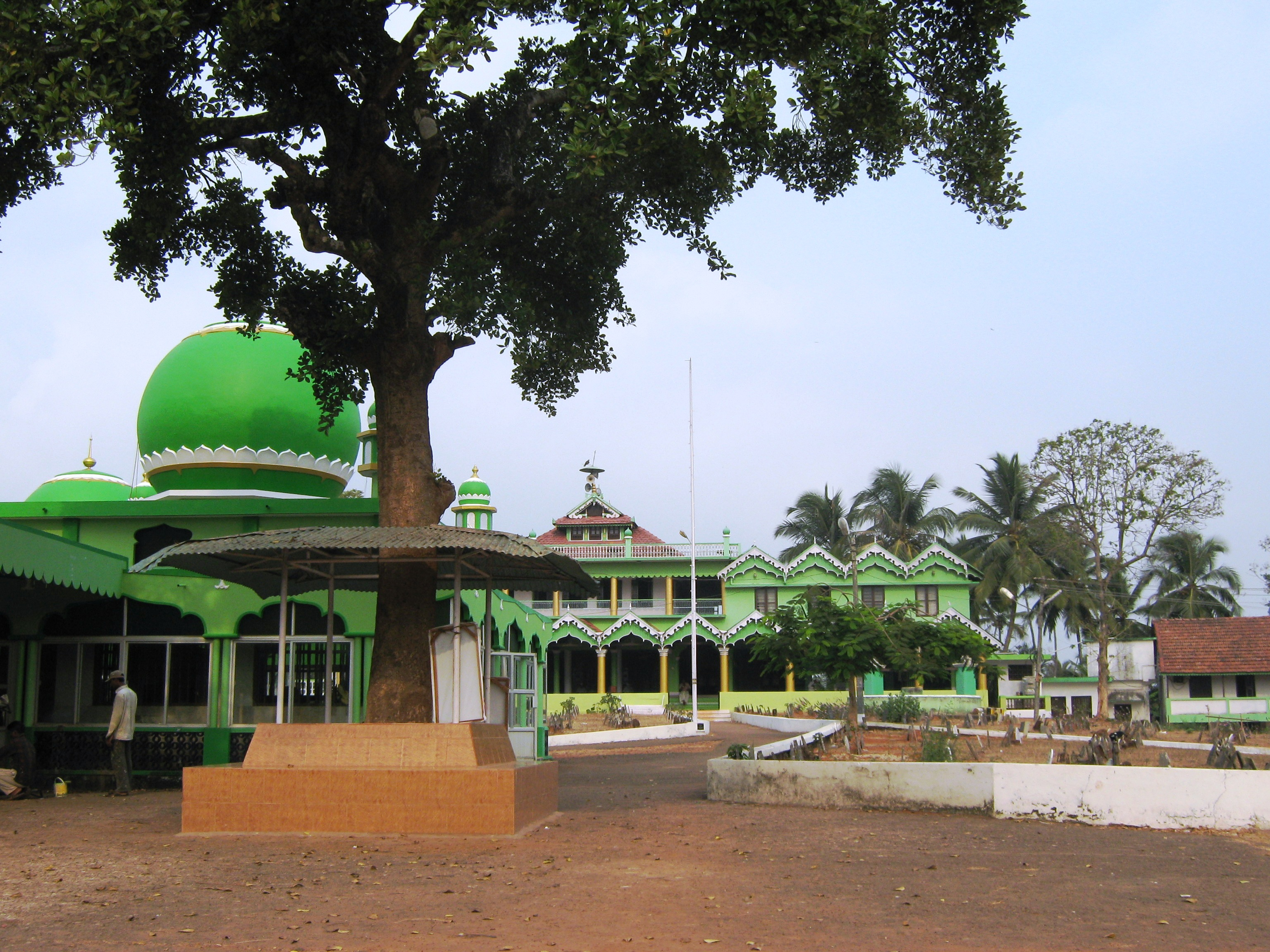
- The mosque in 2010

- Location of the mosque and dargah in Kerala

Religion
- Affiliation: Sunni Islam
- Festival: Thangal Uppapa Uroos
- Ecclesiastical or organizational status: Mosque and dargah
- Status: Active

Location
- Location: Nellikunnu, Kasaragod district, Kerala
- Country: India
- Interactive map of Muhyaddin Juma Masjid
- Coordinates: 12°30′02″N 74°58′44″E

Architecture
- Type: Mosque architecture
- Style: Indo-Islamic
- Completed: Before the 7th century

Specifications
- Direction of façade: Ka'ba
- Capacity: 1,500 worshippers
- Dome: One
- Minaret: Four
- Materials: Timber; stone

Website
- ashrafnlkn.tk

Muhyaddin Juma Masjid (Malayalam: മുഹ്യദ്ദീന്ജുമ മസ്ജിദ്), is a Sunni Friday mosque and dargah located at Nellikunnu, Kasaragod district, in the state of Kerala, India.

== Overview ==
The mosque houses the tomb of Saint Thangal Uppapa, and is one of the pilgrimage centres in Kasaragod. It draws a huge number of devotees during the famous Nercha period held to mark the respect for the famous Saint Thangal Uppapa.

The exact date of construction is unclear. Muslims in Nellikunnu and the surrounding area owe their history to the mosque. The mosque is devoted to the saint Muhyddin Abdul Qader Jeelani.

=== Uroos ===
Thangal Uppapa Uroos is a ritual celebrated by the local people to remember the demise of the saint Thangal Uppapa. It takes place once every two years and usually in the month of Dul Hijj.

== Gallery ==
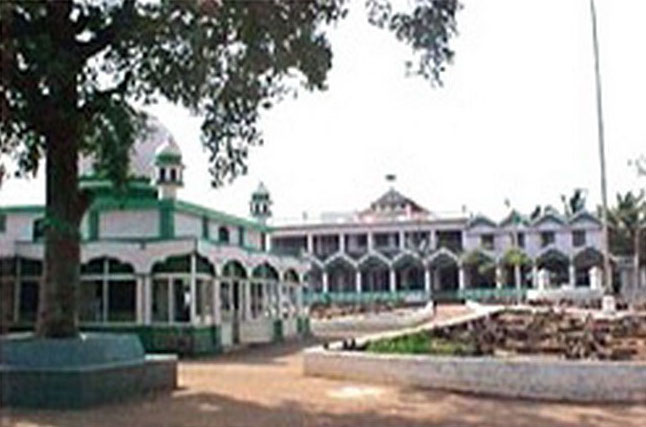
The mosque in 2009

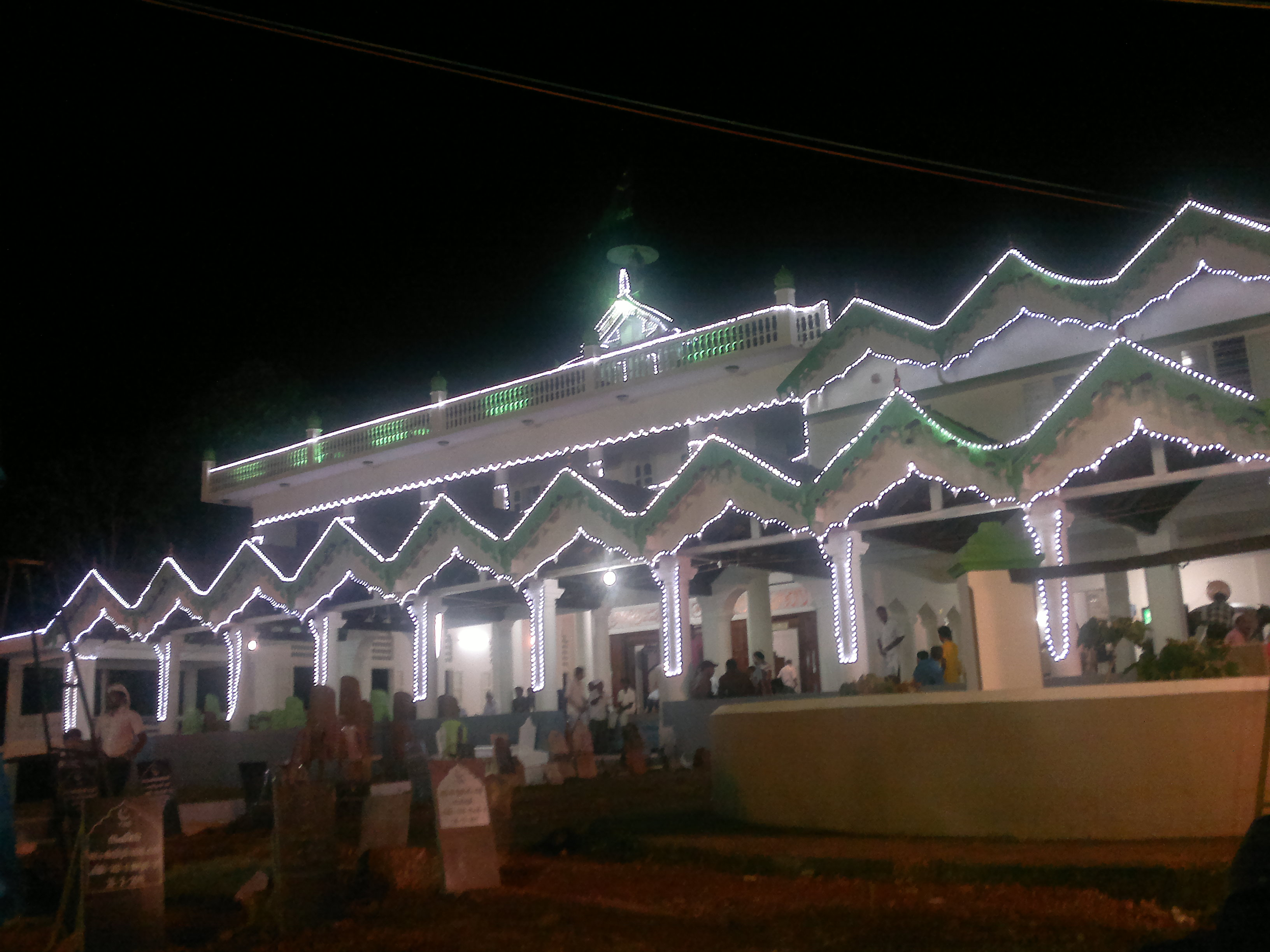
The mosque at night, in 2012

== See also ==
- Islam in India
- List of mosques in India
- List of mosques in Kerala
