= Thangal Uppapa =

Thangal Uppapa تنغل اباب
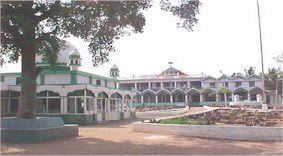
- Thangal Uppapa

Saint hailing from Kollam, later buried in Nellikunnu, Kasaragod
- Born: Kollam, Kerala, India
- Died: 6 September 1962 (India) Nellikunnu, Kasaragod,
- Venerated in: Islam
- Influences: = Thangal Uppapa Maqam, Nellikunnu, Kasaragod

Muhammed Haneef Valiyullahi (Arabic: محمد حنيف ولي الله ; died 6 September 1962) popularly known as Thangal Uppapa was a Muslim holy man from Kollam, Kerala.

His tomb, located at Nellikunnu Muhyaddin Juma Masjid, Nellikunnu, 2 km away from Kasaragod, is a pilgrimage centre. His works and services in Kasaragod and Mangalore are regarded by his Muslim community as worthy and peerless.

== Early life ==
He was born in Kollam, Kerala and visited many places. During his time at Mangalore he attracted huge crowds. Eventually he settled at Nellikunnu and lived there until his death.

== Death ==
He died on 6 September 1962. His tomb is located now in Nellikunnu.
