= Kambalakkad Juma Mosque =

Mosque in Wayanad, India

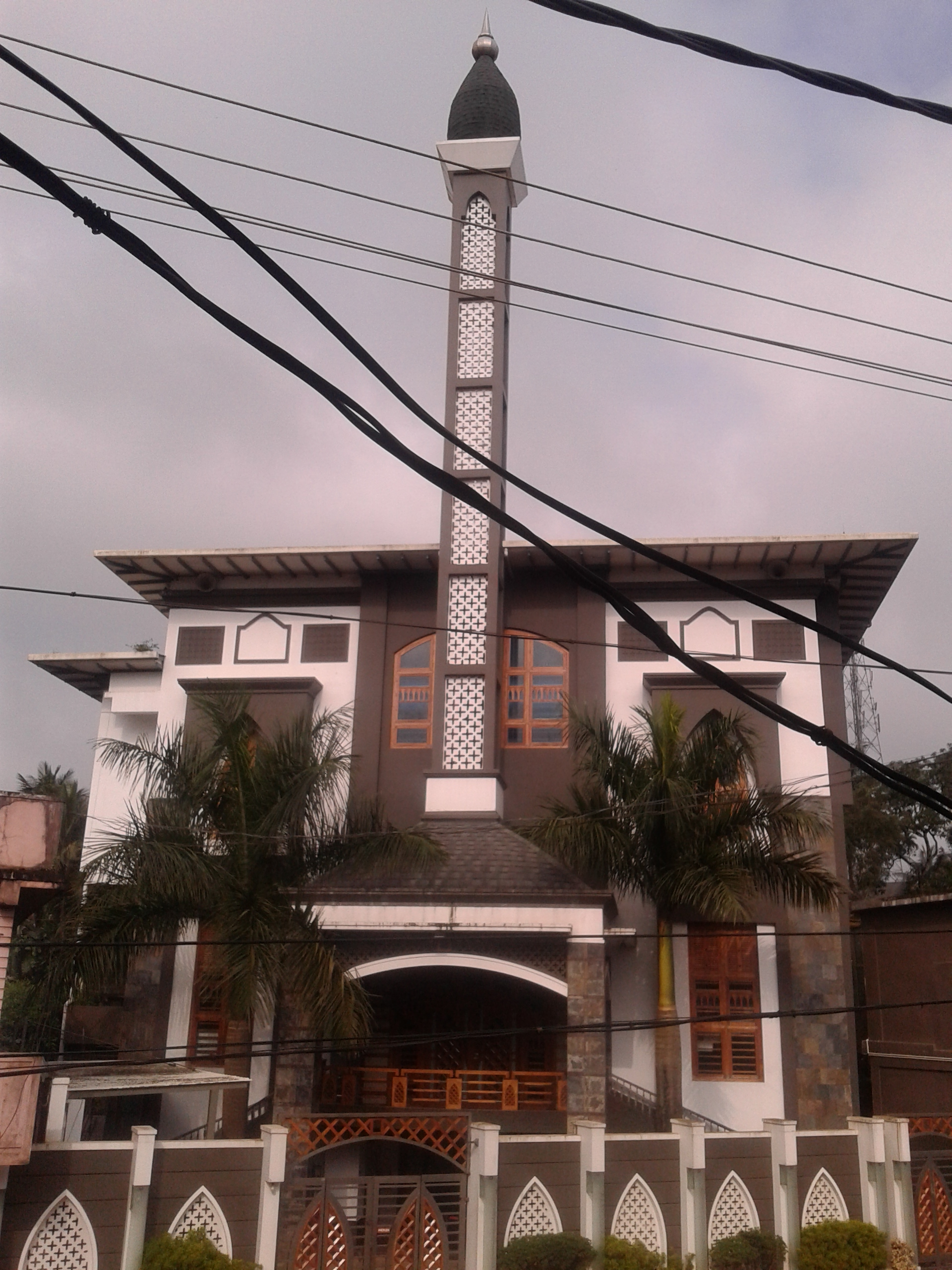
- The mosque in 2019

- Location of the mosque in Kerala

Religion
- Affiliation: Islam
- Ecclesiastical or organisational status: Mosque
- Status: Active

Location
- Location: Kambalakkad, Vythiri taluk, Wayanad district, Kerala
- Country: India
- Coordinates: 11°40′30″N 76°04′33″E

Architecture
- Architects: Ar. Naseer; Prakriti Architects
- Type: Mosque architecture
- Minaret: One

The Kambalakkad Juma Mosque is a Friday mosque, located at Kambalakkad, near the Vythiri taluk, in the Wayanad district of the state of Kerala, India. The mosque is one of the most important and biggest mosques in the Wayanad district.

The mosque is administered by Issathul Islam Sangam Kambalakkad.

Kambalakkad is approximately 8 kilometres (5.0 mi) from the district headquarters of Kalpetta and it is one of the main towns on the Kalpetta-Manathavady highway.

== Gallery ==
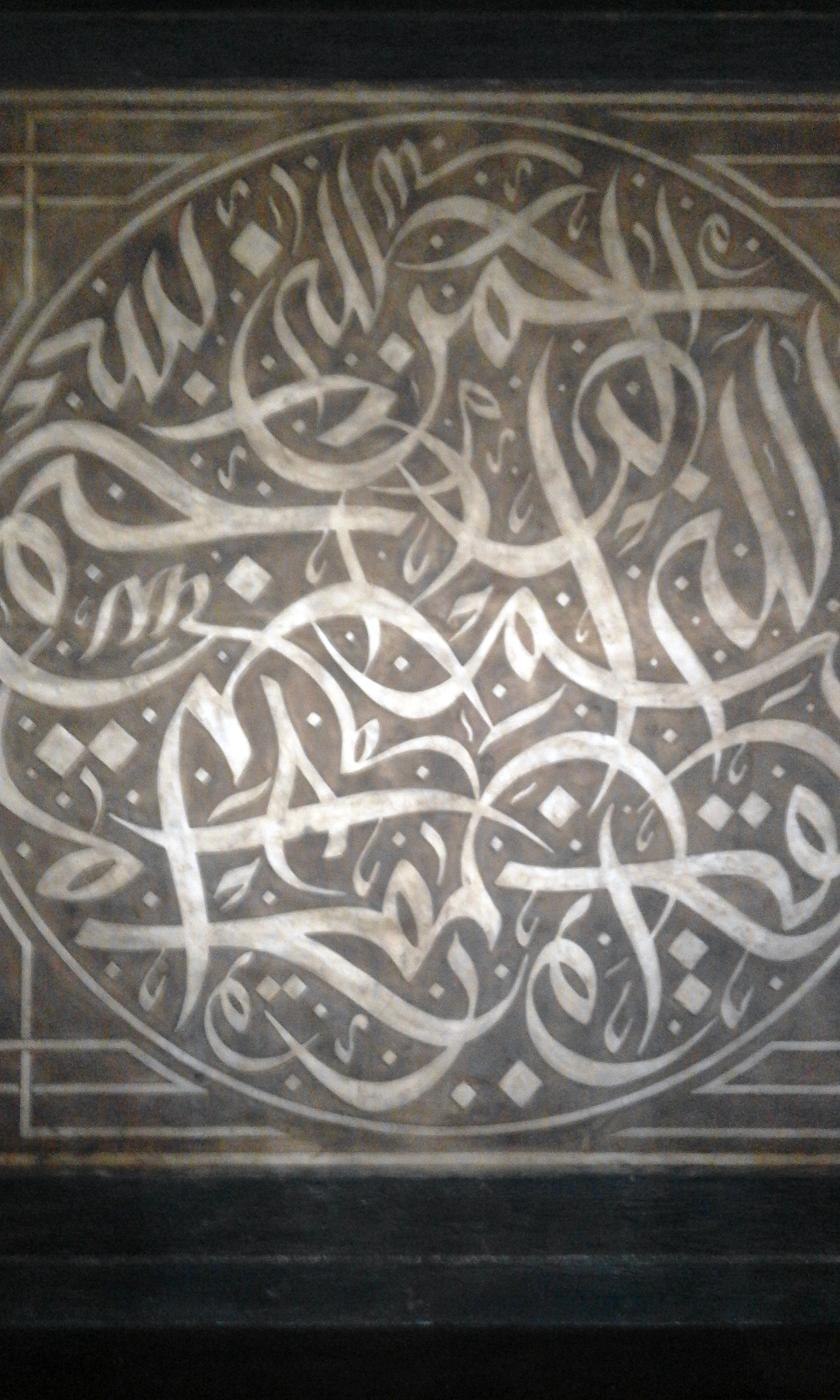
Murals inside the mosque

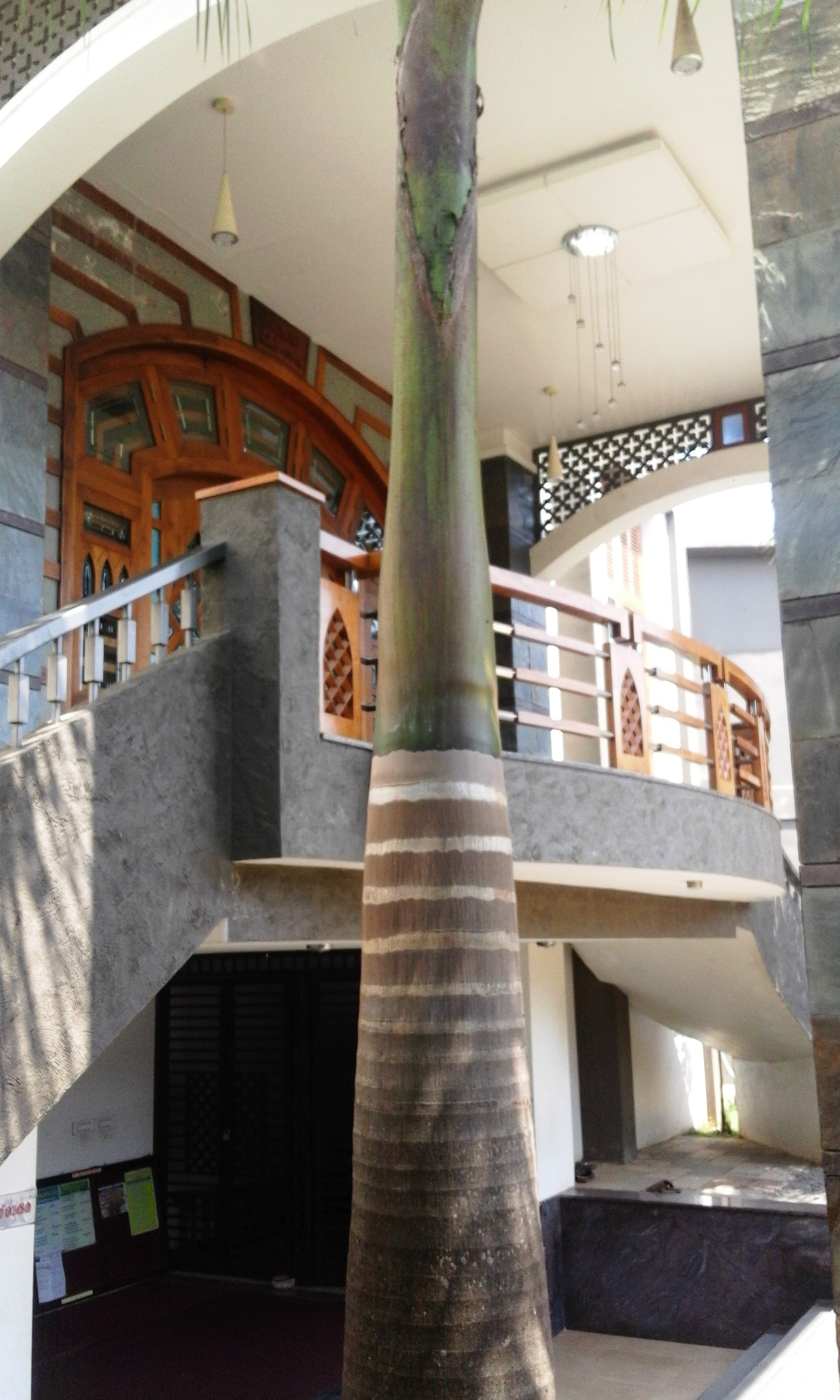
The mosque interior in 2016

== See also ==
- Islam in India
- List of mosques in India
- List of mosques in Kerala
