= Maqam Masjid =

Mosque in Alappuzha, India

- Location of the mosque in Kerala

Religion
- Affiliation: Sunni Islam
- Ecclesiastical or organizational status: Mosque
- Status: Active

Location
- Location: Alappuzha district, Kerala
- Country: India
- Interactive map of Maqam Masjid
- Coordinates: 9°29′33″N 76°19′21″E

Architecture
- Type: Mosque architecture
- Style: Kerala-Islamic; Vastu shastra
- Founder: Raja Kesava Das
- Completed: mid-19th century
- Materials: Lime mortal; timber; tiles

The Maqam Masjid, also locally known as the Muham Palli, is a Sunni mosque in the Alappuzha district of the state of Kerala, India. The mosque is one of the historically important structures in Alappuzha. Built in the mid-19th century, the mosque building was renovated in 2022 under the Alappuzha Heritage Project of Government of Kerala. The Maqam Masjid is located near the canal named Vadakanal, in Civil Station Ward of Alappuzha municipality.

== History ==
Alappuzha was an important commercial and industrial centre in medieval Kerala. Raja Kesava Das, the Diwan of Travancore, also known as the 'creator of modern Alappuzha', made Alappuzha a major port city of Travancore. To improve the spice trade, the Diwan built many roads, canals, and warehouses. As a result, traders and businessmen from throughout India, including Kachi memans, Gujarati Muslims and Pathans, arrived in Alappuzha in search of employment. The Diwan invited many Gujarati Muslim families from Bombay to settle in Alappuzha; and gave permission for mosques to be built on both sides of the canal. The Maqam Masjid was built during the mid-19th century.

== Architecture ==
The Maqam Masjid is one of the historically important structures in Alappuzha. The mosque was built in the Kerala-Islamic traditional Vastu shastra architectural style, that were typically built without a minaret. It is a relatively small mosque, with capacity for approximately 200 worshippers.

The old mosque building was renovated in 2022 under Alappuzha Heritage Project of the Kerala Government, at a cost of 15 million. The mosque was renovated in such a way that the uniqueness of the old structures including the inner hall, doors, upper floor and stairs were not lost. The old 'L'–shaped building, built in the Kerala-Islamic traditional style, was kept intact while renovated.

== See also ==
- Islam in India
- List of mosques in India
- List of mosques in Kerala
