= Kambalakkad =

Village in Kerala, India

Coordinates: 11.675°N 76.076°E

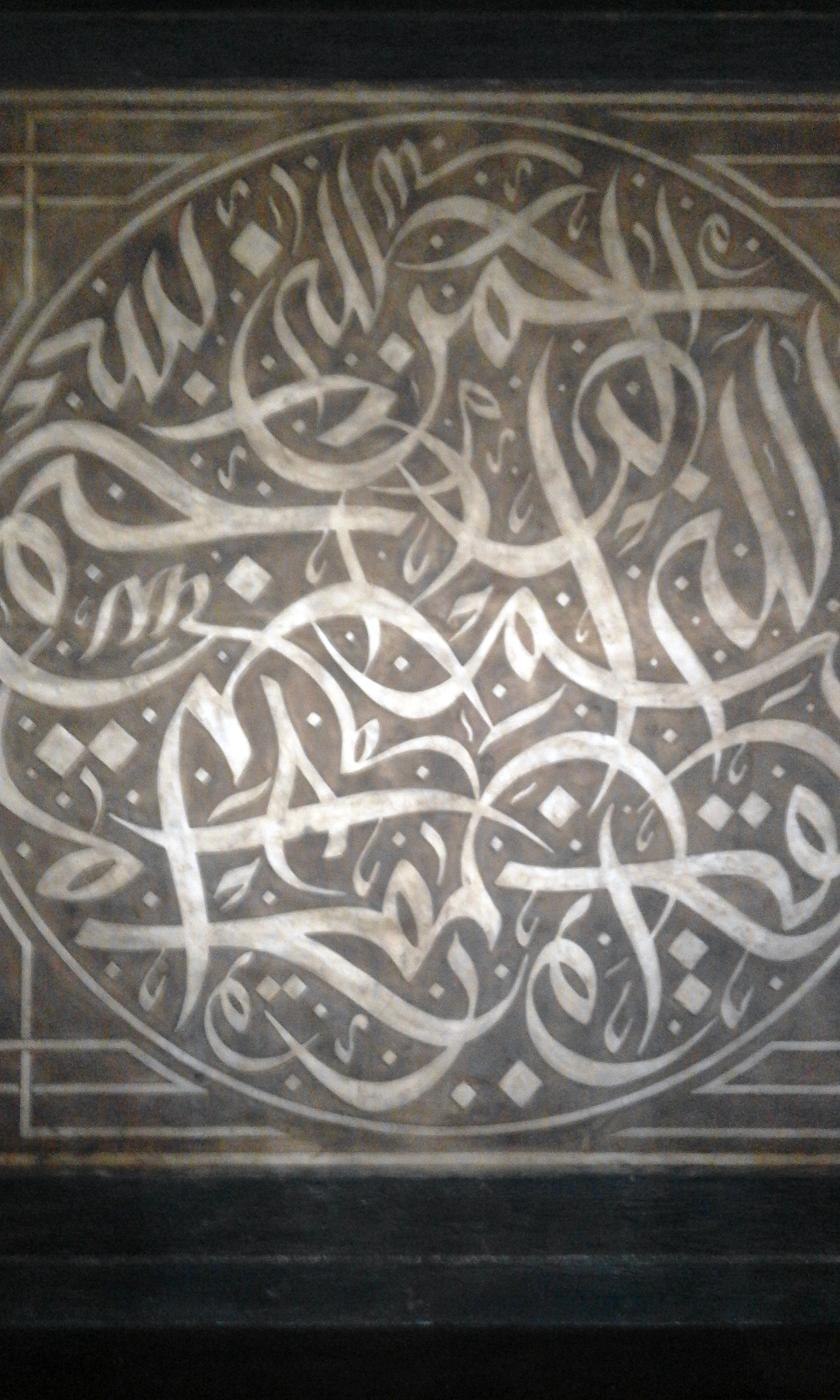
Mural at Kambalakkad Mosque

Kambalakkad is a town in the Wayanad district, Kerala, India. It is about 8 kilometres (5.0 mi) away from district headquarters at Kalpetta, and is one of the main towns on the Kalpetta-Manathavady state highway.

== Kambalakkad Mosque ==
The Juma Masjidh at Kambalakkad is an architectural splendor and the main landmark of the town. There are many murals in the masjidh. The mosque is located in the very middle of the town. The majid is designed by Ar. Naseer of Prakriti Architects, Kozhikode, one of the best architectural firms in south India. The mosque brings out a vibrant looks for the city.

== Ansariya Educational Complex ==
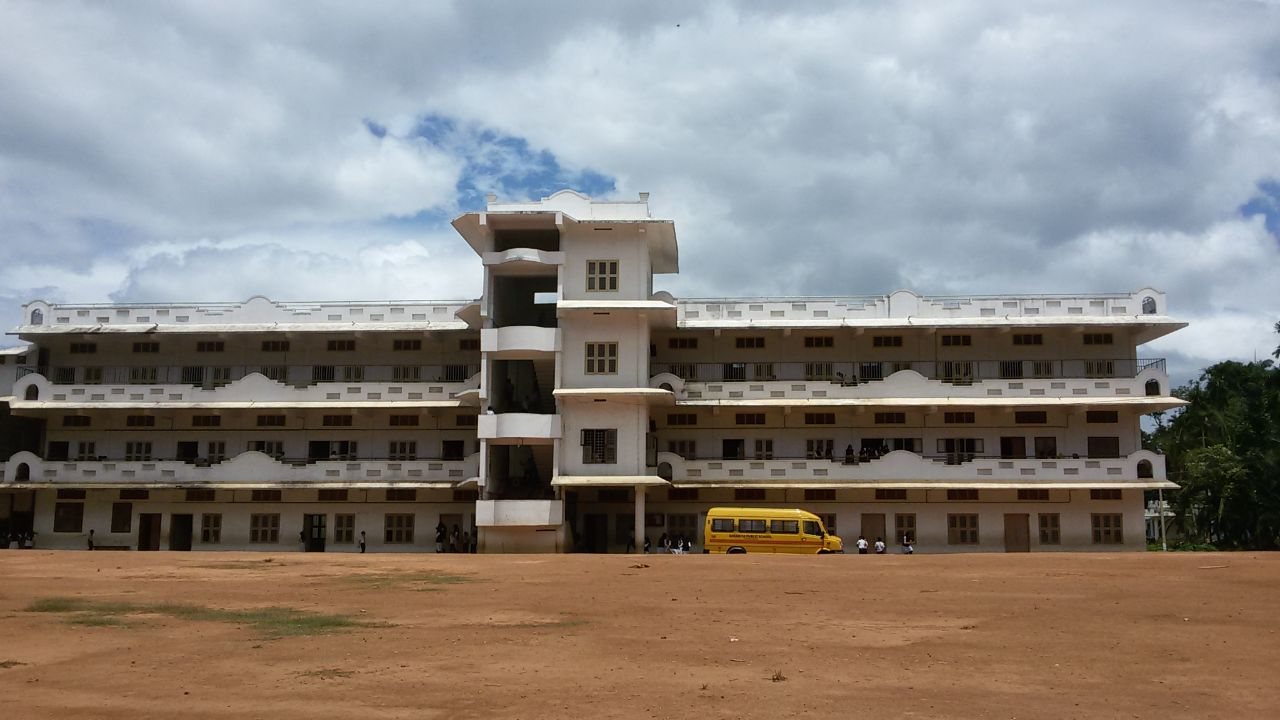
Ansariya Educational Complex

Ansariya Kambalakkad is an educational complex in Kaniyambetta Panchayath, Wayanad. It is located in the heart of Kambalakkad. It includes a school, Ansariya public school, secondary madrassa, conference hall and a woman's college. Ansariya public school is one of the most important public schools in Kerala. It is regulated by the Kambalakkad South Madrassa Committee (KSMC). It includes a school, madrassa, hall, and a +2 school.

== Transportation ==
Kambalakkad is between Mananthavady and Kalpetta. The Periya ghat road connects Mananthavady to Kannur and Thalassery. The Thamarassery mountain road connects Calicut with Kalpetta. The Kuttiady mountain road connects Vatakara with Kalpetta and Mananthavady. The Palchuram mountain road connects Kannur and Iritty with Mananthavady. The road from Nilambur to Ooty is also connected to Wayanad through the village of Meppadi.

The nearest ground transportation, a railway station, is at Kozhikode. The town is 85 km away and the nearest airport is Kannur International Airport, which is 90 km away.
