= Saukar Masjid =

Mosque in Alappuzha, Kerala, India

- Location of the mosque in Kerala

Religion
- Affiliation: Islam
- Ecclesiastical or organizational status: Mosque
- Status: Active

Location
- Location: Alappuzha district, Kerala
- Country: India
- Interactive map of Saukar Masjid
- Coordinates: 9°29′43″N 76°20′13″E

Architecture
- Type: Mosque architecture
- Style: Ottoman; Eastern European
- Founder: Raja Kesava Das
- Completed: 1850

The Saukar Masjid is a mosque in the Alappuzha district, in the state of Kerala, India. Completed in 1850, the mosque is an historically important structure in the Alappuzha district.

== History ==
Alappuzha was an important commercial and industrial centre in medieval Kerala. Raja Kesava Das, the Diwan of Travancore, known as the 'creator of modern Alappuzha', made Alappuzha a major port city of Travancore. To improve the spice trade, the Diwan built many roads, canals, and warehouses. Traders and businessmen from throughout India, including Kachi memans, Gujarati Muslims, and Pathans, came Alappuzha in search of employment and market. Many Gujarati Muslim families were invited from Bombay and settled at the initiative of the Diwan. The Diwan had also allotted sites to build places of worship.

The Saukar Masjid was built on a land granted by Raja Kesava Das in 1850 to the Halai Memon community who came from Porbandar in Gujarat.

== Location ==
Saukar Masjid is located in Alappuzha municipality, approximately 1.7 kilometres (1.1 mi) from the Alappuzha Bus Stand and approximately 3.1 kilometres (1.9 mi) from the Alappuzha railway station.

== Architecture ==
The Saukar Masjid an historically important structure in Alappuzha. The mosque was built in the Ottoman and Eastern European architectural styles that prevailed at the time of its construction. Considering its age and architectural features, restoration work was carried out as part of the Alappuzha Heritage Project in 2022 and the mosque was converted into a protected place of worship by the Kerala Government.

== See also ==
- Islam in India
- List of mosques in India
- List of mosques in Kerala
