= Nellikunnu =

Nellikkunnu (Kasaragod)
- Village
- Location within Kerala
- Coordinates: 12.500793°N 74.978467°E
- Country: India
- State: Kerala
- Region: Malabar, Tulu Nadu
- District: Kasaragod

Government
  - Body: Municipality
- Elevation: 19 m (62 ft)

Languages
  - Official: Malayalam Tulu
- Time zone: UTC+5:30 (IST)
- PIN: 671121
- Telephone code: 91–04994
- Vehicle registration: KL-14
- Website: www.ksd.kerala.gov.in/
- The place of unity and tranquillity

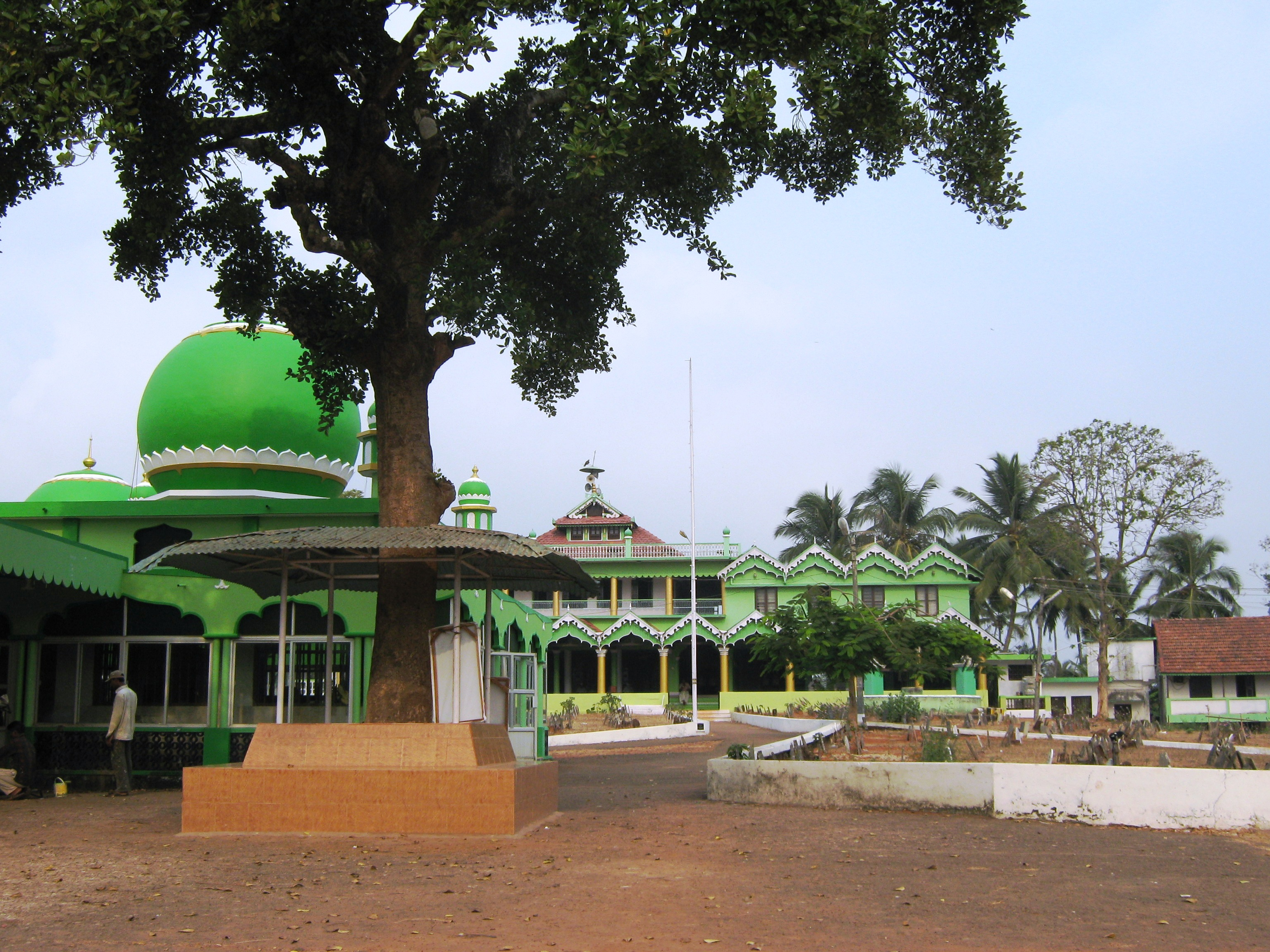
Nillikkkunnu Thangal Uppappa Masjidh

Nellikunnu is a locality in Kasaragod municipality. It is 2 km away from Kasaragod Town . Many historical monuments, including the tomb of Thangal Uppapa are located here.

== Thangal Uppapa ==
Thangal Uppapa is mystic saint hailing from Kollam, Kerala. His tomb locates at Nellikunnu, 2 km away from Kasaragod, is pilgrimage centre.

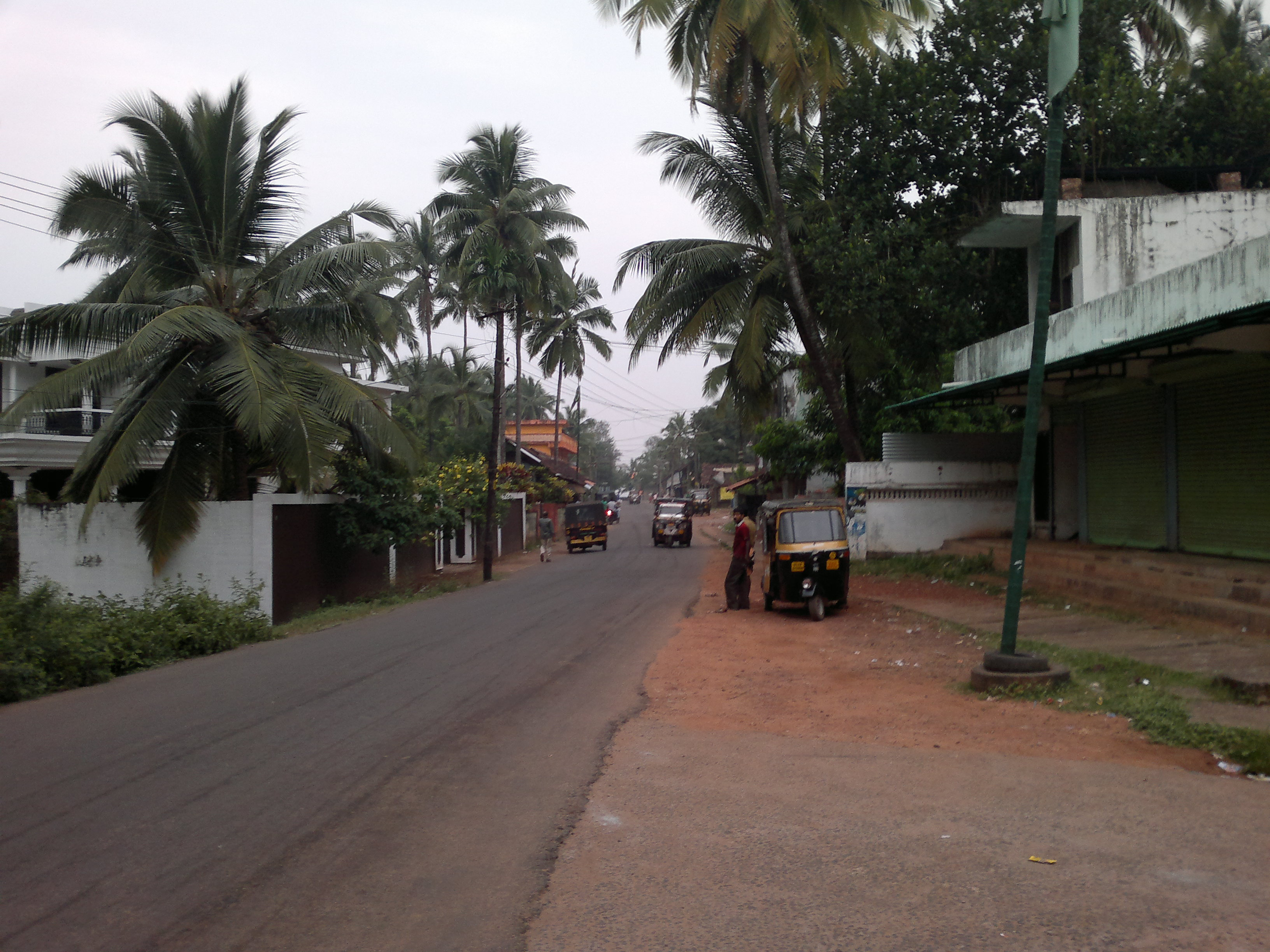
Beach road nellikunnu

== Muhyaddin Juma Masjid ==
Nellikunnu Muhyaddin Juma Masjid, one of primitive masjids in Kasaragod, houses the tomb of Thangal Uppapa and also include huge number of believers. It is also considered as the center of religious unity in the locality. It is believed that the construction of the mosque is earlier than the arrival of Thangal Uppapa.

== Badriya Masjid Nellikunnu Beach Road ==
It is believed that the site of this masjid was the place of the saint's usual sitting.

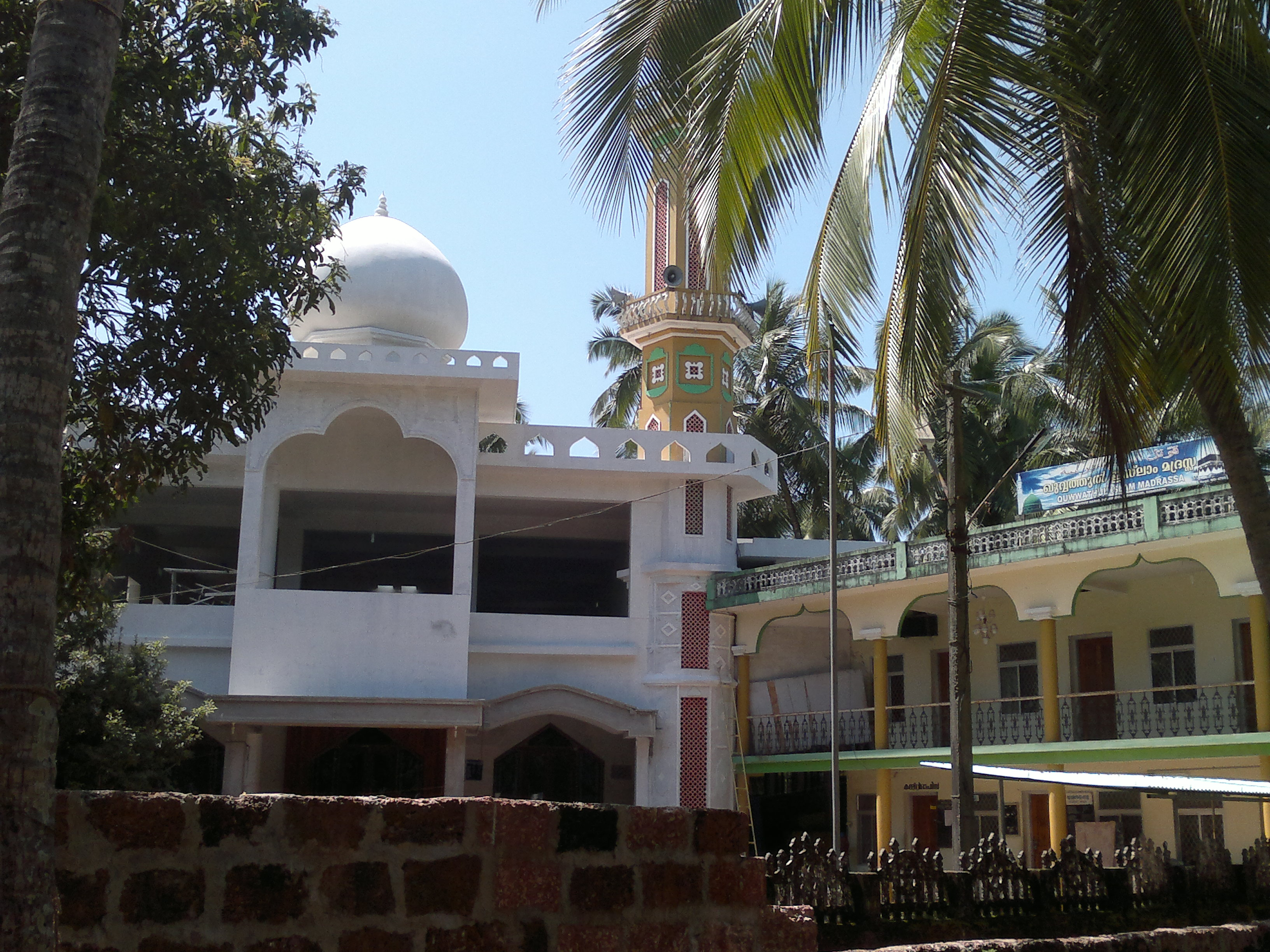

== Anvarul Uloom Aided Upper primary School ==
Anvarul Uloom Aided Upper Primary School, Nellikunnu (A.U.A.U.P.School) is a primary school managed by Thangal Uppapa committee and aided by Kerala government. It is established under auspicious occasion to promote the educational activities among backward communities of mappila and fisheries.

== Gov. Voccasional Higher Secondary School for Girls ==
Gov. Voccasional Higher Secondary School for Girls, one of main girls-only school in Kasaragod, locates in Nellikunnu. It provides all educational facilities for girls of location and promote women education of the district.

== The Peace Public School ==
Peace Public School is private school, affording international facilities for students.

== The Guide School ==
The Guide School is private school owned Iqbal. There is nursery school also active under the management.

== Light house ==
Light house, the sole type in Kasaragod, locates in this location. It was built under the Kochi shipyard.

== Image gallery ==
Ansarul Islam sangam

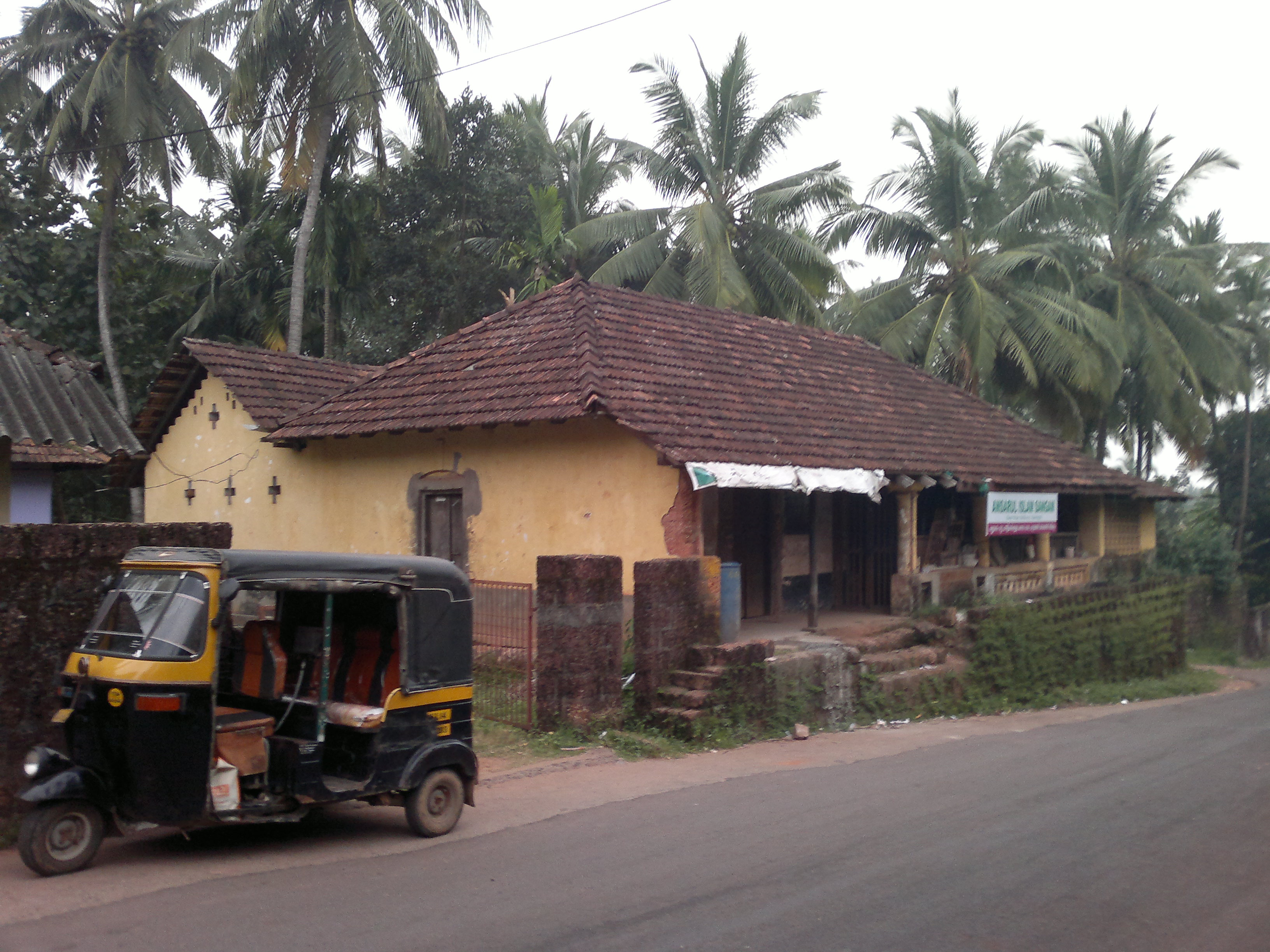
Anvarul uloom oldest building

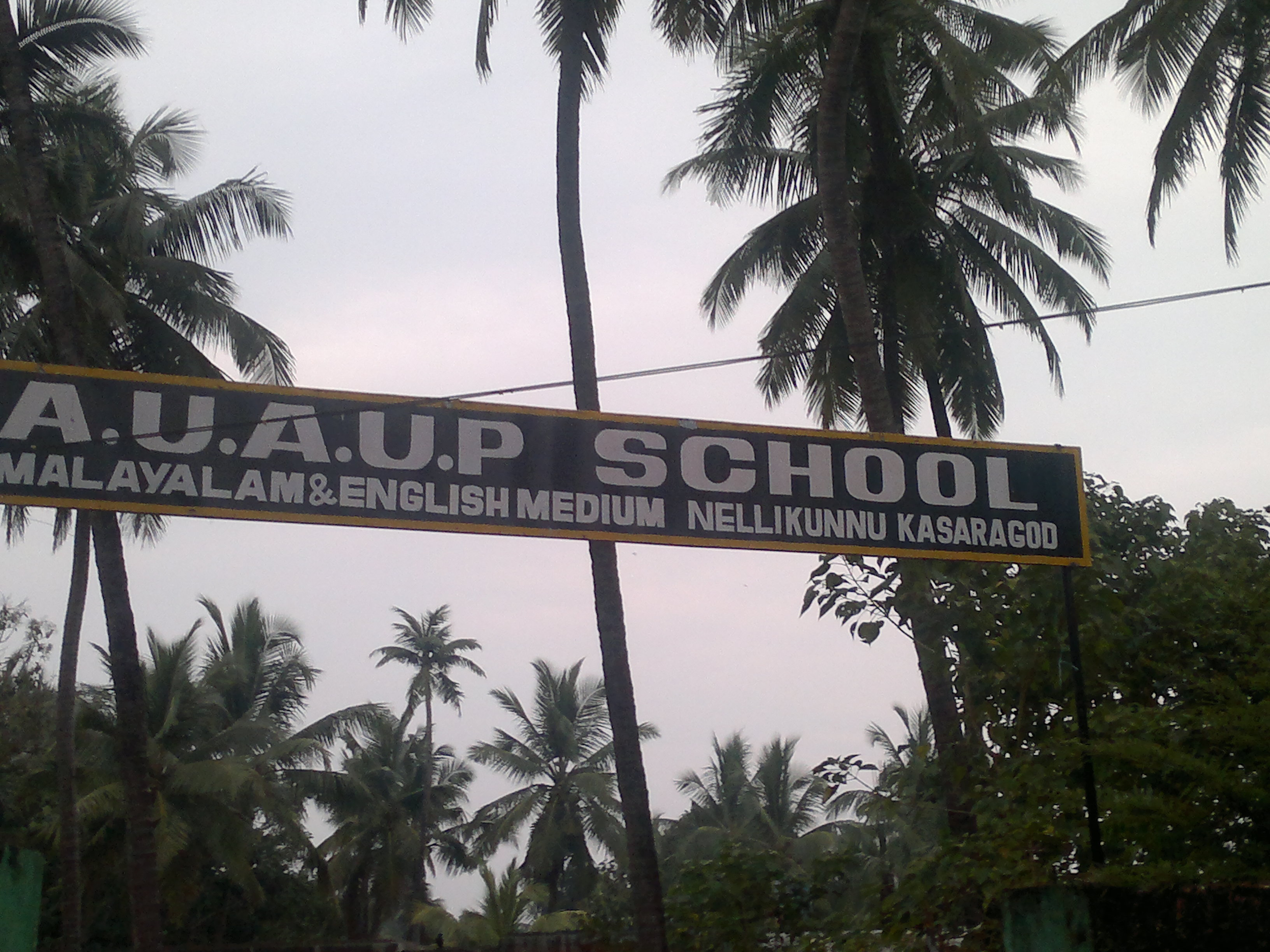
Anvarul uloom new entrance

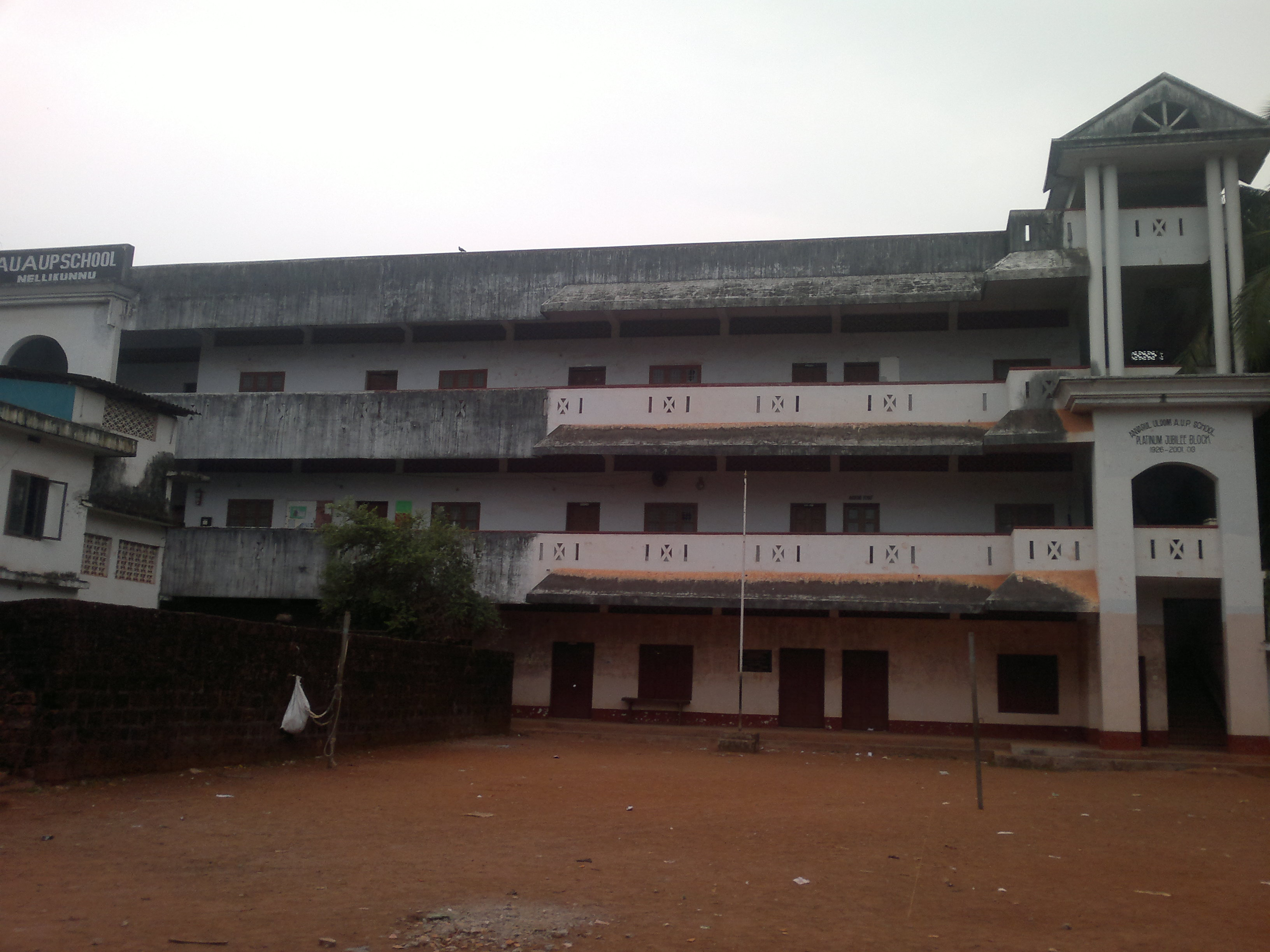
Anvarul uloom new building

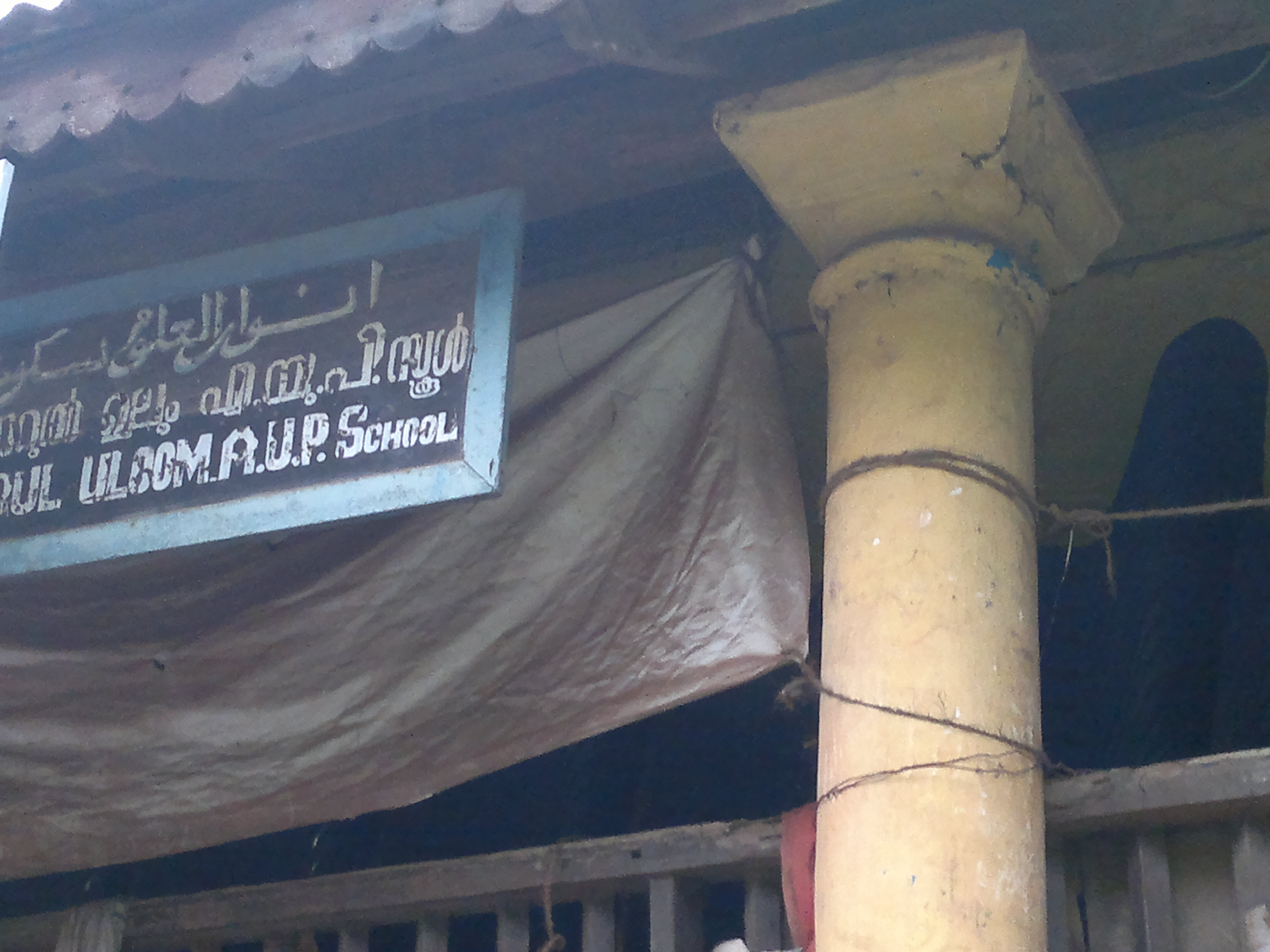
Anvarul uloom oldest building

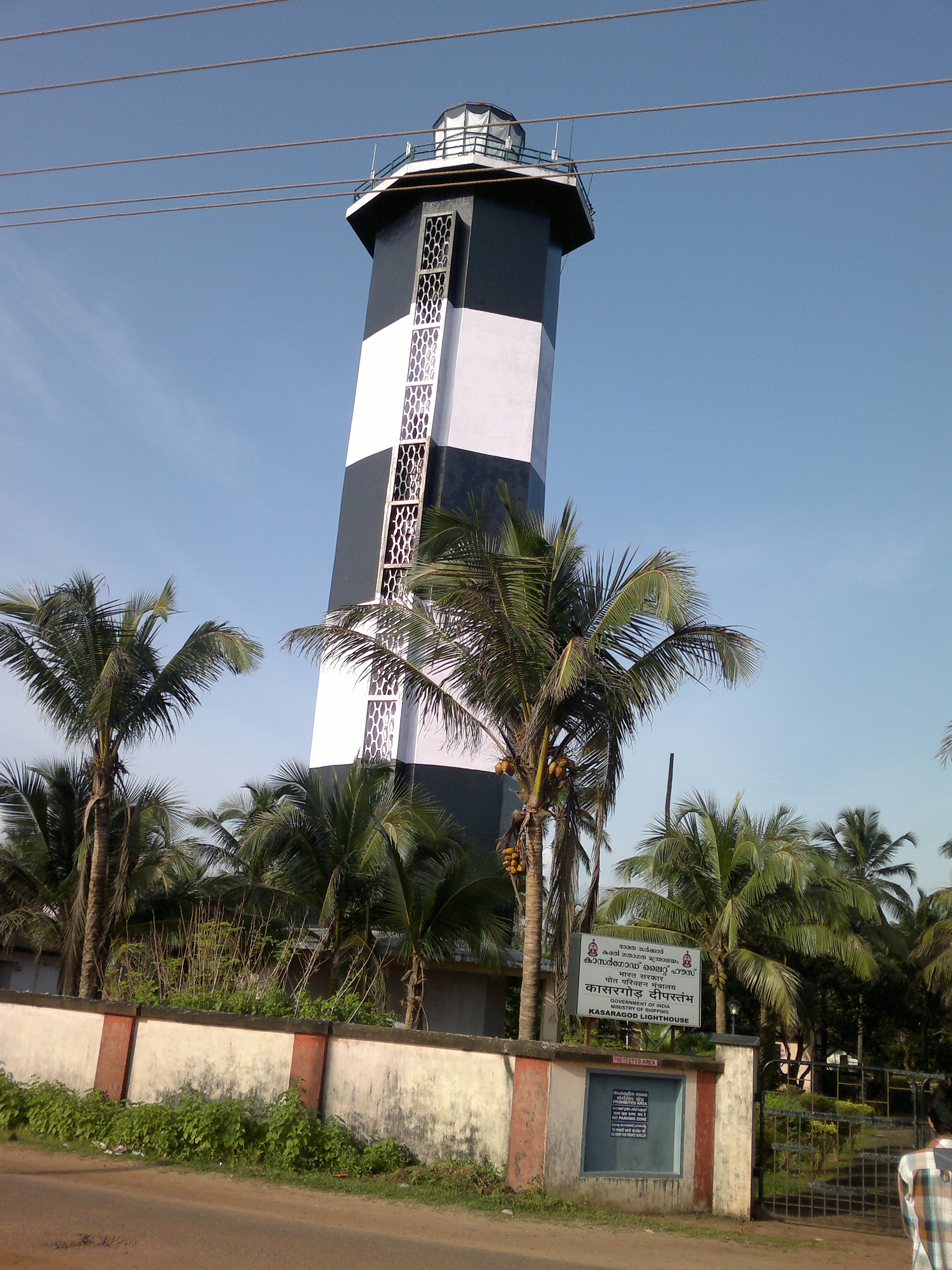
Light house nellikunnu

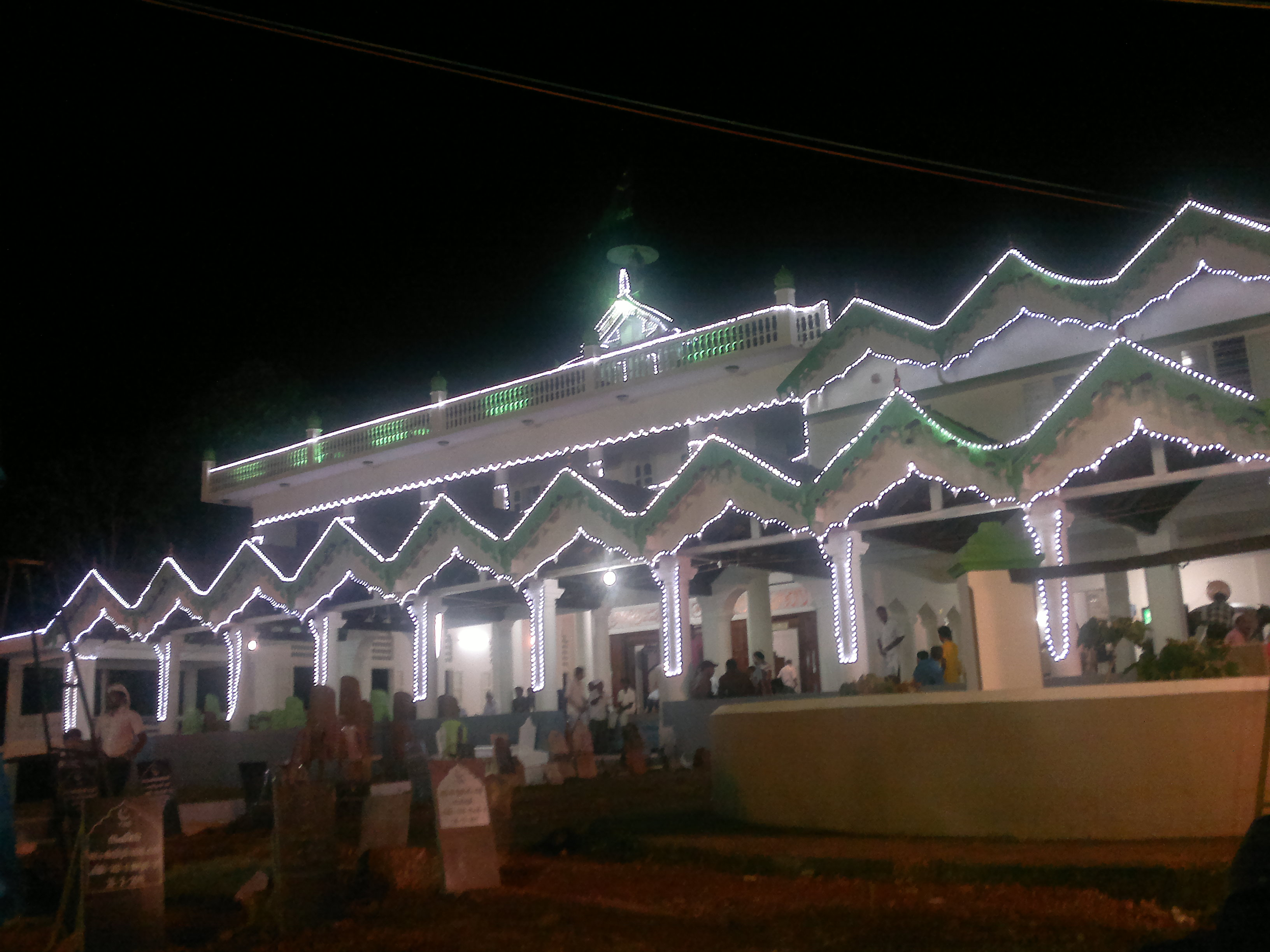
Nellikunnu Juma Masjid

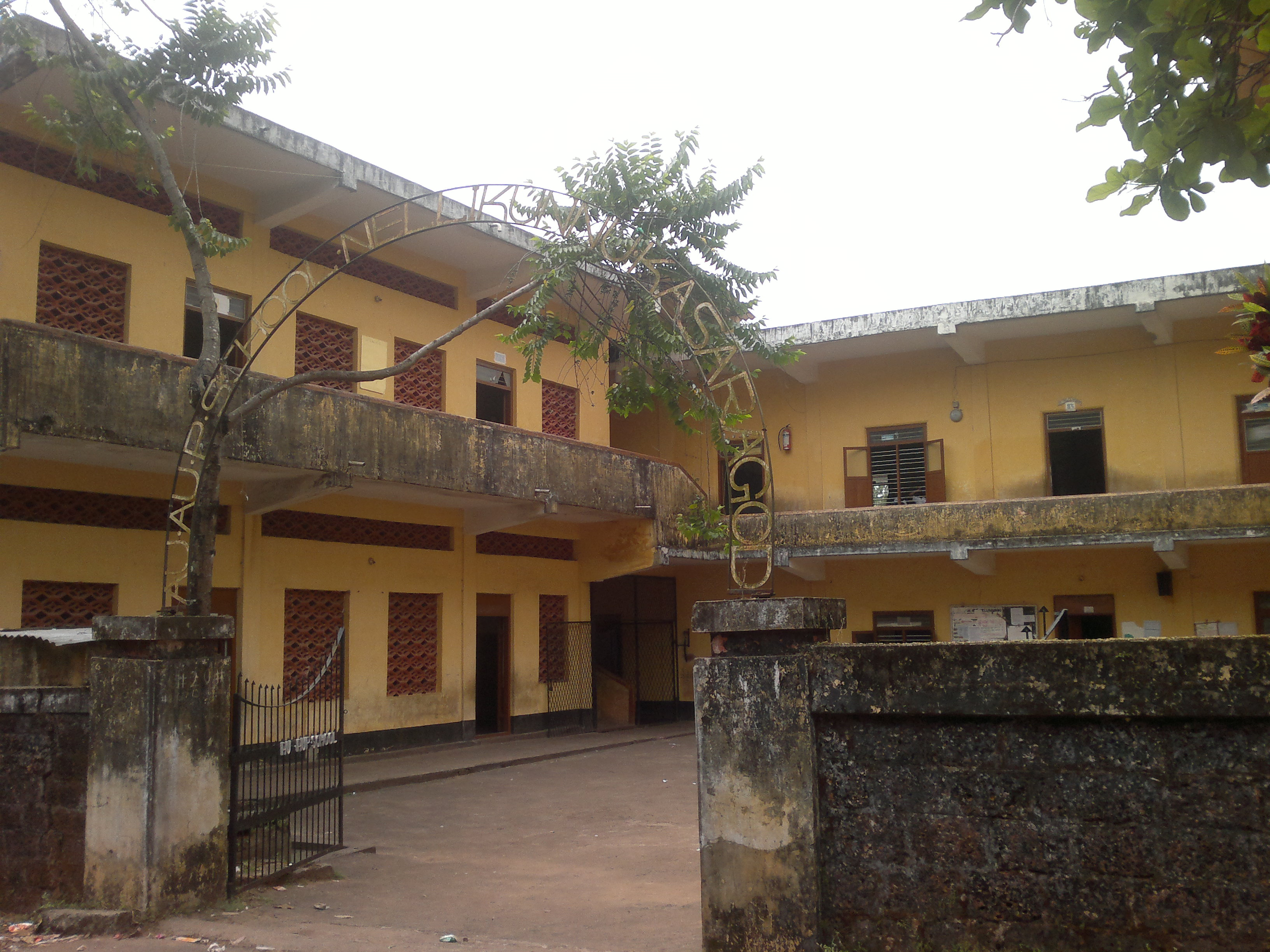
A.U.A.U.P.School
