= Pullancheri, Manjeri =

Pullancheri
- village
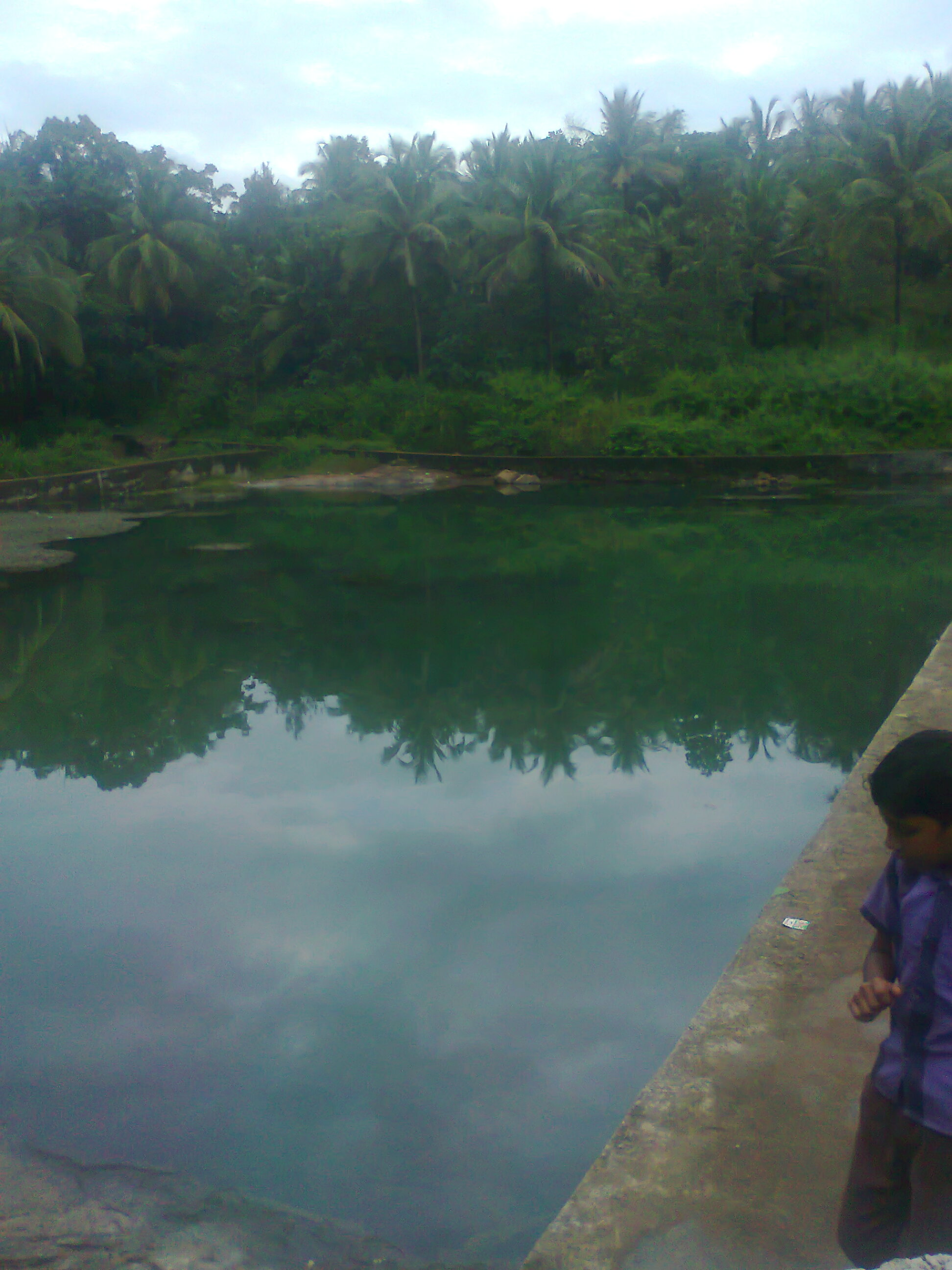
- Alungal Dam

- Location in Kerala, India Pullancheri (India)
- Coordinates: 11°5′0″N 76°9′0″E
- Country: India
- State: Kerala
- District: Malappuram

Languages
  - Official: Malayalam, English
- Time zone: UTC+5:30 (IST)
- PIN: 676122
- Telephone code: 0483
- Vehicle registration: KL-10
- Coastline: 0 kilometres (0 mi)
- Climate: Tropical monsoon (Köppen)
- Avg. summer temperature: 35 °C (95 °F)
- Avg. winter temperature: 20 °C (68 °F)

Pullancheri is the 28th ward of Manjeri municipality, in Malappuram district, Kerala, India. The area is hilly and one river flows through it, the Kadalundy River. Pullancheri is situated 5 kilometres away from the town of Manjeri.
