= Markaz =

Markaz may refer to:

== Organisations ==
- The Markaz, formerly the Levantine Cultural Center, a religious cultural center in West Los Angeles, California
- Markazu Saqafathi Sunniyya, a university in Kerala, India
- Markaz Knowledge City, a city project in Kozhikode, Kerala, India
- Markaz, Dubai, a religious and cultural centre of the Markaz in Dubai, UAE
- TV Markaz, a defunct Uzbekistani television channel

== Places ==
- Markaz (administrative division), second-level administrative division found in Asia and Africa
- Markaz, Hungary, a village in Heves County in northern Hungary
- Markaz, Kyrgyzstan, a village in Batken Region, Kyrgyzstan
- Markaz Rif Dimashq District
- Markaz-e Garm

== Other uses ==
- Markaz Shabab Al-Am'ari, a Palestinian football club
- Markaz Balata, a Palestinian football club
- Hasib Quwayi Markaz (1992–2026), Afghan military commander

== See also ==
- Markazi (disambiguation)
