= Samastha Kerala Jem-iyyathul Ulama (AP Sunnis) =

Sunni Islamic organisation in India

Samastha Kerala Jam-iyyathul Ulama
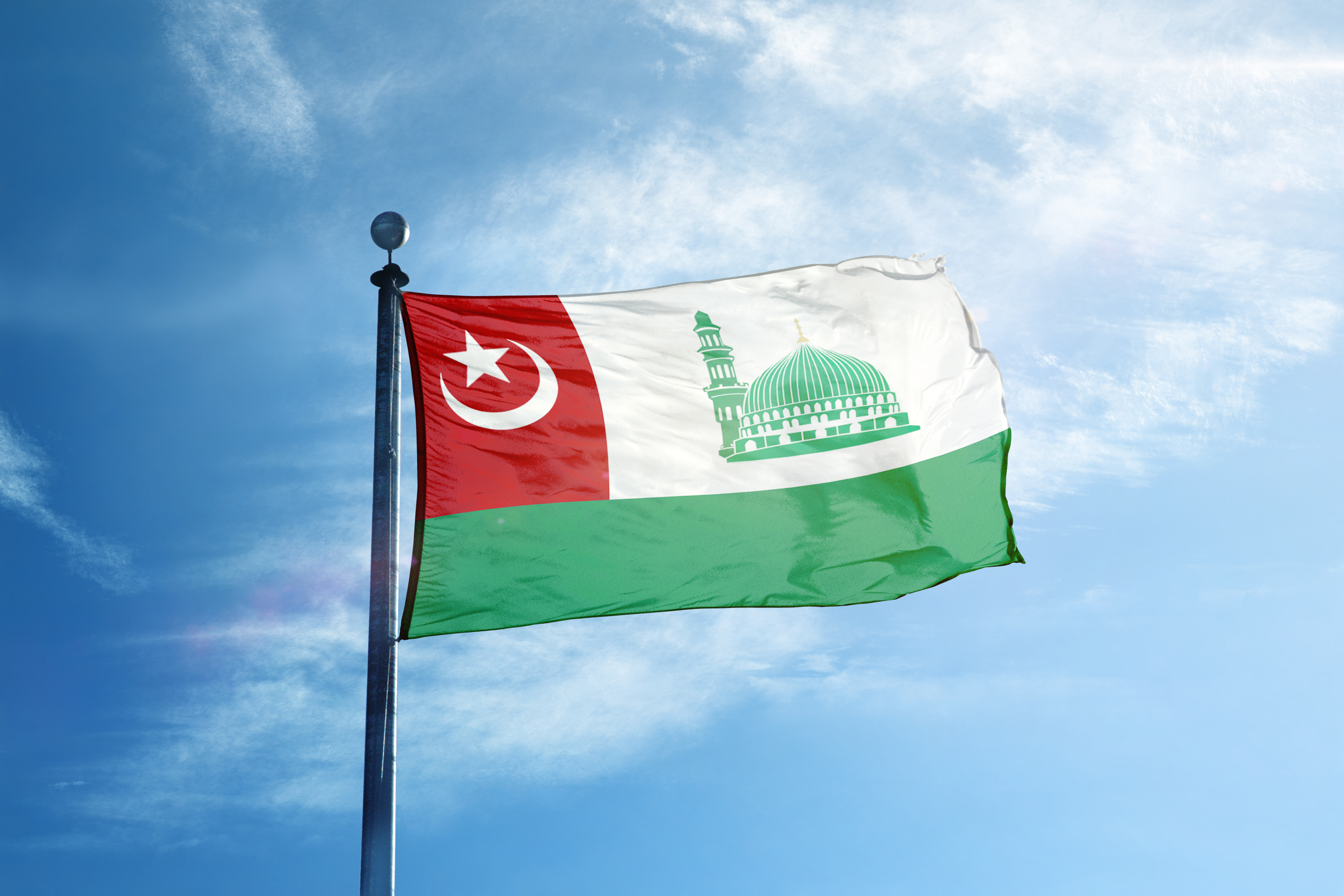
- Flag of AP Samastha
- Formation: 26 June 1926 (100 years ago) (Note: Per AP Sunnis)
- Founder: Varakkal Mullakoya Thangal (Note: Per AP Sunnis)
- Type: Sunni-Shafi'i scholarly body
- General Secretary: Kanthapuram A. P. Aboobacker Musliyar
- President: E. Sulaiman Musliyar
- Treasurer: Kottur Kunjammu Musliyar
- Secretaries: Sayyid Ibraheem Khaleel Al Bukhari; Ponmala Abdul Kadhar Musliyar; Perod Abdurahman Saqafi Kottur
- Vice Presidents: Sayyid Ali Bafaqi Thangal; P. A. Aidrus Musliyar Kollam; K. S. Attakoya Thangal Kumbol

Samastha Kerala Jem-iyyathul Ulama of AP Sunnis, also known as Samastha and AP Samastha, is a Sunni-Shafi'i Muslim scholarly body in Kerala. The council administers Shafi'ite mosques, institutes of higher religious learning (the equivalent of north Indian madrasas) and madrasas (institutions where children receive basic Islamic education) in India. There are two organisations known as Samastha, one named after E. K. Aboobacker Musliyar and the other after Kanthapuram A. P. Aboobacker Musliyar, both of which emerged in 1989, due to organisational disagreement in Samastha.

Similar to EK Sunnis, a forty-member council also known as the 'mushawara' functions as a high command body of AP Sunnis. As of December 2023, the council includes Samastha general secretary Kanthapuram A. P. Aboobacker Musliyar; Samastha president E. Sulaiman Musliar; vice presidents Sayyid Ali Bafaqi Thangal, P. A. Aidrus Musliyar Kollam and K. S. Attakoya Thangal Kumbol; treasurer Kottur Kunjammu Musliyar; secretaries Sayyid Ibraheem Khaleel Al Bukhari, Ponmala Abdul Khadir Musliyar and Perod Abdurahman Saqafi.

Samastha of AP Sunnis claims to be the real Samastha. Over 8000 madrasas are afflicted to Samastha of AP Sunnis. In one occasion Kanthapuram A. P. Aboobacker Musliyar said "we did not go outside of Samastha." AP and EK Sunnis have had dispute over the control of some mosques and madrasas in Malabar. EK Sunnis have often seen aligned with IUML where AP sunnis doesn't agree with Political aligns.

== Population makeup ==
Traditionally Muslims of Kerala are Sunnis, predominantly Shafi'is where around two-thirds of the Muslim population is AP and EK Sunnis, respective Samasthas of which emerged in 1989 due to disagreement in Samastha. The reformist Mujahids, belonging to the Salafi movement, make up around 10 percent of the total Muslim population of Kerala. Though there is presence of groups like Tabligi Jamaat and Jamaate Islami, by far the biggest groupings are Sunnis and Mujahids.

Samastha Kerala Jem-iyyathul Ulama (AP faction), Samastha Kerala Jem-iyyathul Ulama (EK faction), Dakshina Kerala Jem-iyyathul Ulama and Kerala Samsthana Jem-iyyathul Ulama are different factions of Sunnis in Kerala, while Dakshina Kerala Jem-iyyathul Ulama is the dominant group in the southern part of the state.

== Ideological difference ==
Samastha began in 1926 to counter Vakkom Moulavi's Kerala Muslim Aikya Sangam—the precursor of KNM and the wider Mujahid movement. Only traditionalist Sunnis are called Sunnis in Kerala in contrast to the reformist ones. The four different factions of Sunnis in Kerala have "almost the same ideology and beliefs". Haris Madani, a young scholar belonging to AP Sunnis, in 2022, said the difference between AP and EK Sunnis is purely organisational whereas Husain Madavoor, a Mujahid leader, considers fiqh to be irrelevant.

== Samastha in AP Sunnis' words ==
=== Change of name ===
Kanthapuram, a leader of AP Sunnis says Sunnis formed an organisation to counter the religious reformists with the name Kerala Jem-iyyathul Ulama. But the reformist people had registered the same name. So Sunnis had to add the term "Samastha" to the name of the organisation at the conference held at Kozhikode Town Hall on 26 June 1926.

=== Flag ===
According to AP Sunnis, Samastha for the first time adopted the Samastha's flag on 29 December 1963, at a meeting of Samastha held at the Thalankara Malik Dinar Valiya Jumuath Mosque in Kasaragod. The flag was adopted with minor modification including the removal of the script from the flag that was then in use by the All India Sunni Jem-iyyathul Ulama.

=== Reorganisation ===
Kanthapuram further says Samastha was reorganised and went ahead with the interests Samastha had at the time of its formation, when there were attempts to join with the reformists and deviate in Samastha around 1989.

=== Success ===
Kanthapuram explains people unitedly supported Samastha after its formation. He also says after the reorganisation in 1989, the Samastha went ahead with strong force, with all policies and ideologies of Samastha all over India and outside.

== Affiliated entities ==
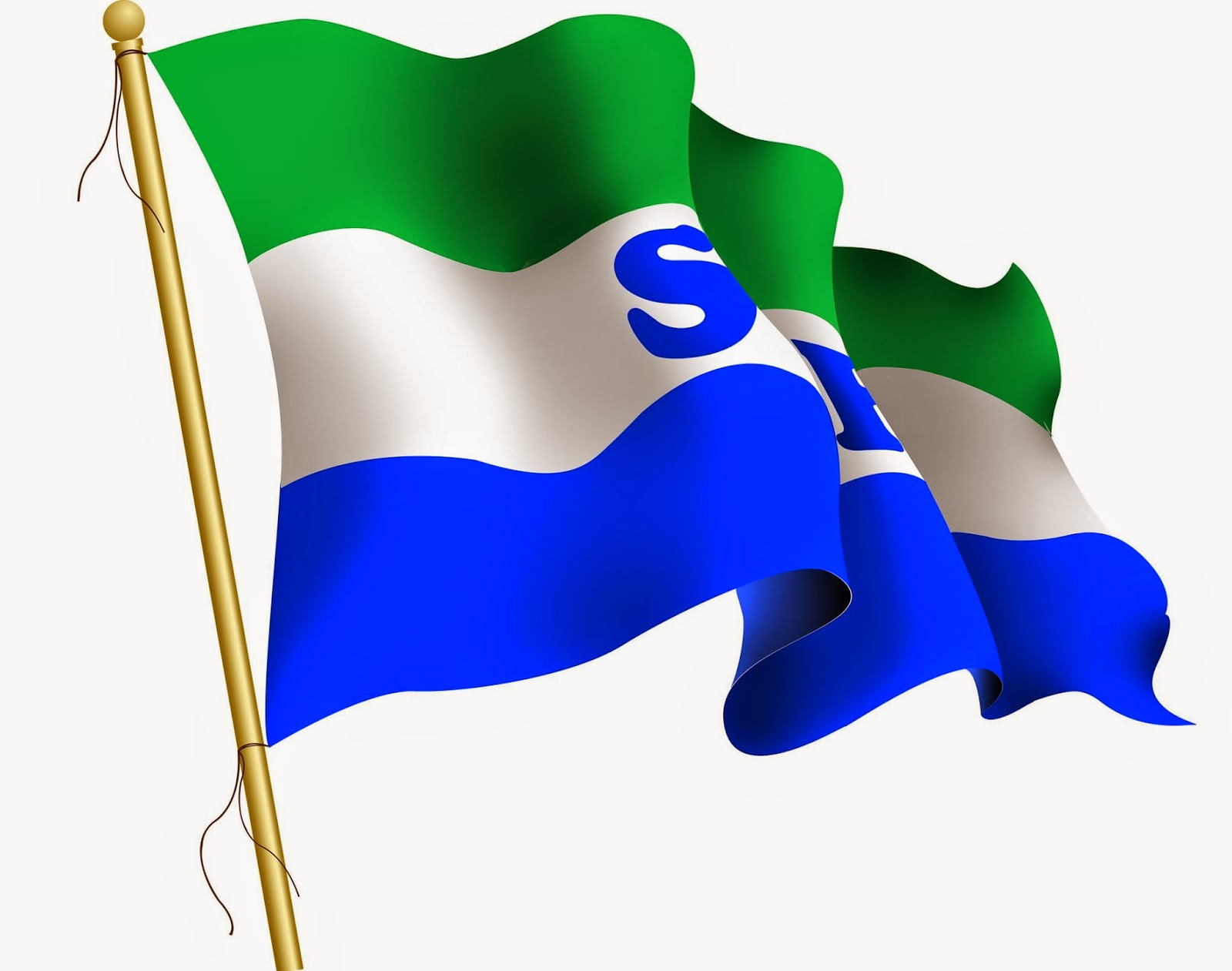
Flag of Sunni Students' Federation

Samastha of AP Sunnis have several affiliated entities. They include:

- Kerala Muslim Jama'ath
- Sunni Management Association (SMA)
- Educational board – Samastha Kerala Sunni Vidhyabhyasa Board
- Madrasa teachers' association – Sunni Jam-iyyathul Muallimeen (SJM)
- Youth wing – Samastha Kerala Sunni Yuvajana Sangham (SYS)
- Student wing – Sunni Students' Federation (SSF)
- Jamiathul Hind

== Other entities of AP Sunnis ==
=== Organisations ===
- Scholarly body
  - All India Sunni Jamiyyathul Ulama
- Children's wing
  - Sunni Bala Sangham (SBS)

=== Periodicals ===
- Siraj
- Risala
- Sunni Voice
- Kusumam
- Sunnath

=== Notable institutions ===
- Jamia sa-adiya
- Markazu Saqafathi Sunniyya
- Markaz Knowledge City
- Ma'din Academy
- Jamia Ihyaussunna
- Markazul Hidaya Kombam
- Jamia Mahmoodiyya
- Jamia Hasaniyya

== See also ==
- All India Sunni Jamiyyathul Ulama
- Kanthapuram A. P. Aboobacker Musliyar
- Sunni Students' Federation
- Kerala Muslim Jamaat
