= Markaz, Dubai =

Religious and cultural center of Markazu Saqafathi Sunniyya in Dubai, United Arab Emirates

Coordinates: 25.28270°N 55.32542°E

Sunni Cultural Center, Dubai, also called Markaz Dubai is a religious and cultural center of Markazu Saquafathi Sunniyya in Dubai, United Arab Emirates. Opened on April 22, 2010, under the supervision of the Islamic Affairs and Charitable Activities Department of Dubai, the center intendedly provides a variety of services to members of the Muslim community.

== Information ==
Markaz Dubai is an educational center for those who wish to increase their knowledge of Islamic principles and cultural values, and therefore intends to strengthen the social structure of the community. The center provides counselling and support in all areas of family life, including pre-marital and marital counselling, marital contracts, and parenting. The center also hosts charitable and social events, such as meetings and blood drives.

Founding members of the center include: Dr. Hamad Bin Al Shaikh Ahmad Al Shaibani, Director General of Islamic Affairs and Charitable Activities Department in Dubai, Sheikh Abubakr Ahmad, Founder of Markaz, Lt. Gen. Dhahi Khalfan Tamim, Head of General Security of Dubai, Abdul Hakkim Azhari, Managing Director of Markaz Knowledge City, Dr. Omar Mohammed Al Khateeb Executive Director of the Islamic Affairs Sector, Dr. Adel Juma Matar, Head of the Islamic Institutions Department, and Mohammad Abdullah Al Haj Al Zarouni, Head of Emirates Red Crescent.

== Community service ==
During the COVID-19 pandemic, Markaz Dubai participated in humanitarian relief efforts across the emirate. In Ramadan 2020, under the guidance of the Watani Al Emarat Foundation and in coordination with Dubai Police and the Ministry of Health and Prevention (MOHAP), more than 1,000 volunteers from the organization distributed approximately 130,000 iftar meals per day as part of the UAE's "10 Million Meals" campaign. Meal distribution took place across several areas of Dubai, including Deira, Bur Dubai, Karama, Satwa, Al Qusais, Al Quoz, Dubai Investment Park, Jebel Ali, and International City. Volunteers also assisted with food distribution in quarantined areas of Jebel Ali under the supervision of health authorities.

== See also ==
- Knowledge City
- Markaz Law College
- Shahre Mubarak Grand Mosque
- Markazu Saqafathi Sunniyya
