= Sunni Students' Federation =

Indian student organisation (1973)

Sunni Students Federation
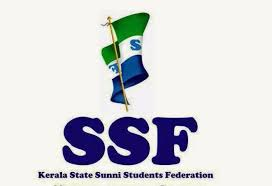
- Abbreviation: SSF
- Formation: 29 April 1973; 53 years ago
- Founded at: Malappuram
- Type: Student organisation
- Legal status: Active
- Headquarters: Nizamuddin West, New Delhi
- National leaders: President : CP Ubaidullah Saquafi Kerala; General Secretary : Dilshad Ahmed Kashmir; Finance Secretary : Muhammed Shareef Nizami
- President: Sayyid Muneer Ahdal Ahsani Kamil Saquafi
- General Secretary: Dr.T Aboobacker
- Finance Secretary: Muhammed Anas Amani Kamil Saquafi
- Publication: Risala Weekly
- Parent organization: Kerala Muslim Jamath
- Subsidiaries: Wisdom Education Foundation of India WEFI; SSF National Campus Syndicate
- Affiliations: All India Sunni Jamiyyathul Ulama
- Website: https://www.nationalssf.org

The Sunni Students Federation (SSF) is an Islamic students' organisation in India. Originated in Kerala in 1973 under the patronage of Kanthapuram A. P. Aboobacker Musliyar. It is affiliated to Samastha Kerala Jem-iyyathul Ulama and Kerala Muslim Jamaath. SSF held the golden fifty National Conference at Mumbai on 2023 November 24, 25 and 26.

== Sauhruda Kaalam ==
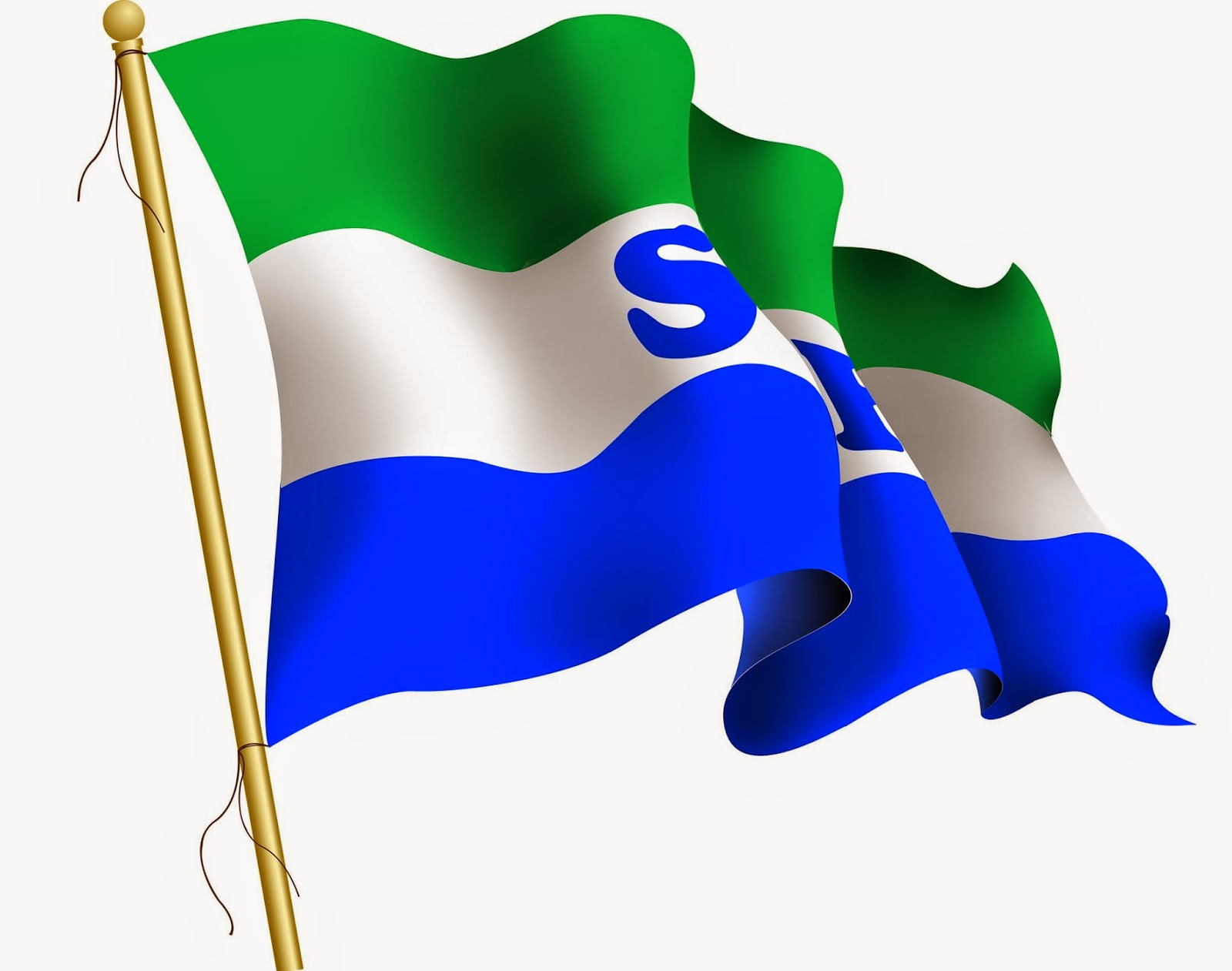
Sunni Students Federation (SSF) Flag

SSF concluded a Campaign on 20 October 2016 targeting Salafis, Jamaat-e-Islami on Islamic State during the campaign public conferences in five major cities including Thiruvananthapuram, Ernakulam and selected cities of Malabar districts besides a statewide campaign named Sauhruda Kaalam.

== SSF 40th Anniversary ==
SSF celebrated its 40th anniversary in Kochi in the month of April 2013 with a three-day conference, which concluded at Jawaharlal Nehru International Stadium, in Kaloor. The Chief Minister of Kerala Oommen Chandy inaugurated the valedictory function and Sheikh Abubakr Ahmad delivered the keynote address. It was attended by thousands of students from both secular and religious institutions. SSF leaders said their activities are not meant to segregate the religious from the secular, but rather to help them complement and understand each other better.

== Hind Safar - Bharat Yatra ==
Hind Safar (also called SSF Bharat Yatra) is a nationwide expedition organised by the Sunni Students Federation to ensure education to all children and build a ‘friendly India’. The rally started from Hazratbal Shrine of Jammu and Kashmir on 12 January and ended at Kerala. The yatra covered 22 States over 16,000 kilometres and received 40 receptions.

== SSF Sahithtolsav ==
Kerala Sahityotsav Promotes and nurtures student art and literature. That programme starts from every families called family sahithyolsav. Later it is conducted in block level. Selected students only can participate in next stages which are Unit, Sector, Division, District, State. In 2022 the first edition of National sahithyolsav was held in Gujarat. In 2023 National Sahityotsav, Karnataka State won by major margin and defeated Kerala and humiliated.

In 2024 National Sahityotsav which was held in Madgaon, Goa ended in December 2, 2024 Team Karnataka won championship again by beating Kerala

== Samvidhan Yatra 2023 ==
SSF is taking out a nationwide rally named Samvidhan Yatra ahead of its golden jubilee celebrations. SSF national president Mohammed Farooq Naeemi is leading the rally that was flagged off by Hazratbal Masjid Imam Mufti Bilal Ahmed at Sri Nagar in Jammu and Kashmir on August 12.

SSF leaders said that the Yatra would cover 22 States, and receptions are being arranged in 33 centres. The SSF is raising many socio-cultural issues that students across the country are facing. “We are visiting major university campuses in different States during the Yatra and engage in conversations and debates with students. Gatherings of religious harmony and meetings with village people as well as educational experts are also on our agenda,” said Dr. Naeemi.
