= Jamiul Futuh =

Grand mosque in Kerala, India

- ഇന്ത്യൻ ഗ്രാൻഡ് മസ്‍ജിദ്
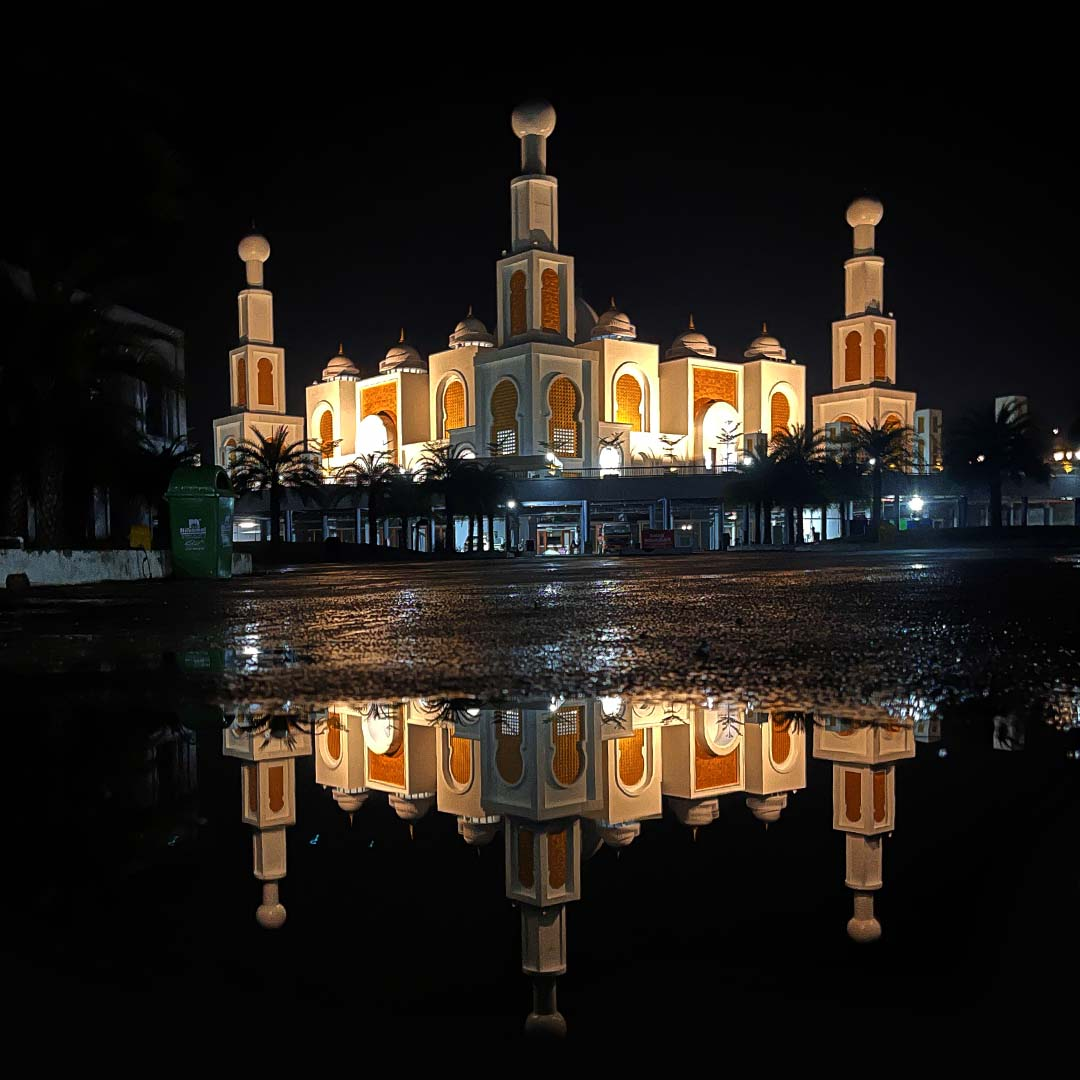
- The Jamiul Futuh at night

- Location of the mosque in Kerala

Religion
- Affiliation: Sunni Islam
- Rite: Shafi‘i
- Ecclesiastical or organizational status: Mosque
- Leadership: Dr. Muhammed Abdul Hakkim Azhari (imam)
- Status: Active

Location
- Location: Markaz Knowledge City, Calicut, Kozhikode district, Kerala
- Country: India
- Interactive map of Jamiul Futuh
- Coordinates: 11°28′20″N 76°00′27″E

Architecture
- Architects: Ar Darvish Kareem; Ar Ahammed Aflah
- Type: Mosque architecture
- Style: Indo-Saracenic Revival
- Founder: Sheikh Abubakr Ahmad; (the Grand Mufti of India)
- Groundbreaking: 2011
- Completed: 2022
- Construction cost: ₹400 million

Specifications
- Capacity: c. 25,000 worshipers
- Length: 420 m (1,380 ft)
- Width: 290 m (950 ft)
- Interior area: 60,900 m^{2} (655,000 sq ft)
- Domes: 17 domes; 3 sizes
- Dome height (outer): 85 m (279 ft)
- Dome dia. (outer): 32.2 m (106 ft)
- Minaret: Five
- Minaret height: 107 m (351 ft)
- Site area: 5.3 ha (13 acres)

Website
- jamiulfutuh.com

The Jamiul Futuh, officially known as the Jāmi'ul Futūh, and also known as The Indian Grand Masjid and the Shahre Mubarak Grand Mosque, is a Shafi‘i Sunni mosque, located in Markaz Knowledge City, in the Kozhikode district of the state of Kerala, in the south of India. It is the largest mosque in Kerala and can accommodate up to 25,000 worshippers. It was founded by Sheikh Abubakr Ahmad, the Grand Mufti of India, and officially opened in September 2022.

The congregation is led by Imam Dr. Muhammed Abdul Hakkim Azhari.

== Overview ==
The mosque has influences of Abbasid, Mughal, Moroccan, and Ottoman architectural elements, and it follows the green building concept. It consists of a research library, the Office of the Grand Mufti of India, and a cultural heritage museum. The building site covers three point six hectares (nine acres) and is surrounded by a 1.6-hectare (4-acre) green belt and a 6,700-square-metre (72,000 sq ft) rooftop garden.

The mosque grounds contain a relic, believed by Muslims to be a hair of the Islamic prophet Muhammad. The name of the mosque comes from the Arabic word shahre, meaning hair, and mubarak, meaning blessed.

== Founder ==
Sheikh Abubakr Ahmad is an Islamic scholar and community leader, pivotal in the growth and development of the Muslim community in Kerala. His service includes holding the position of General Secretary of the All-India Muslim Scholars Association and serving as the Chancellor of Jamia Markazu Ssaquafathi Ssunniyya.

A core focus of his life has been promoting Islamic education and working to improve the socio-economic status of Muslims in India. He is also a vocal advocate for interfaith dialogue. He is an author, having written approximately 60 books on a variety of religious and social subjects.

== Architecture ==
The mosque showcases the captivating Indo-Saracenic Revival architectural style. The grounds of the mosque also contain a madrasa, that provides education and Islamic courses and classes.

The architecture combines traditional and contemporary styles. The main entrance features white and gold artistic details. The mosque has four main large gates, named the Makkah Gate, Madinah Gate, Yamani Gate and Shami Gate. Additionally, there are nine entrance doors, known as Babu'l-Fath, Babu's-Salam, Babu't-Tawbah, Babu's-Safaa, Babu'l-Ihsan, Babu't-Taqwa and Babu'r-Rahma.

The mosque also features Indo-Arabian domes. The interior features four pillars dedicated to the names of the four great Imams: Imam Abu Hanifa, Imam Malik bin Anas, Imam Shafi'i, and Imam Ahmad bin Hanbal. The central dome's rotunda is adorned with Quranic verses, including passages from Surah Al-Muzzammil, Surah Al-Fath, Ayah Al-Kursi, and the ayah "Innallaha wa malaaikathahu".

The Mihrab (Pulpit) is a masterpiece of design, featuring a depiction of a green plant with the 'Asmaul Husna' (the divine names of Allah) inscribed on its leaves. A distinct feature of the mosque is the raised Azan chamber positioned opposite the pulpit. Furthermore, calligraphy art featuring the names of Allah, Prophet Muhammad (s), Abubakr, Umar, Uthman, Ali, and Fatima graces the inner hall.

== See also ==
- Islam in India
- List of mosques in India
- List of mosques in Kerala
