= Sayyid Ibraheem Khaleel Al Bukhari =

Sunni Islamic scholar

- സയ്യിദ് ഇബ്റാഹീം ഖലീല്‍ അല്‍ ബുഖാരി
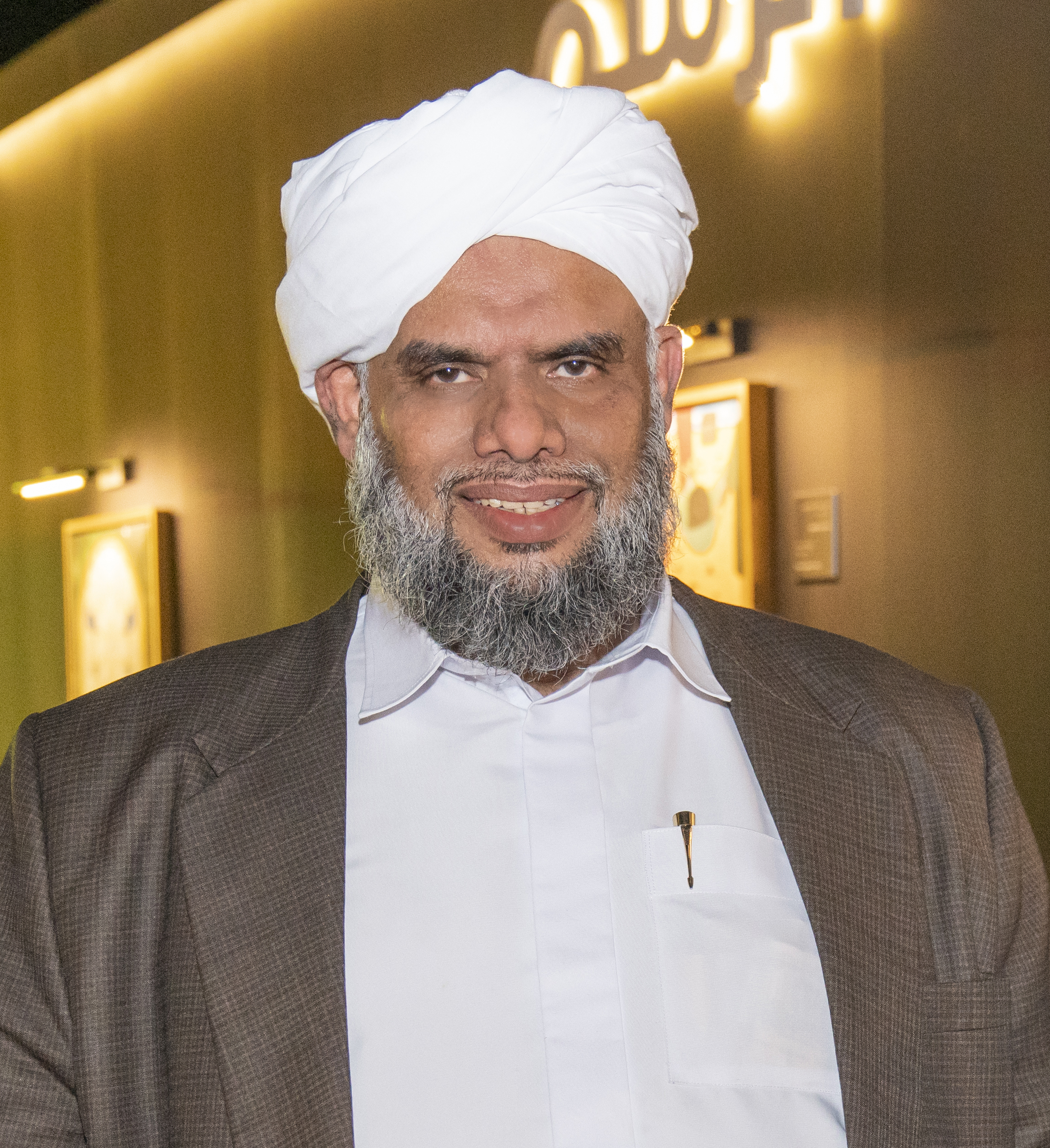

Chairman of Ma'din Academy

Personal details
- Born: Sayed Ibraheem Khaleel Bukhari Thangal; 22 February 1964 (age 62) Kadalundi, Kozhikkode
- Website: Official website
- As of 9 April, 2014 Source: Sayyid Ibraheem Khaleel Al Bukhari

Sayyid Ibraheem Khaleel Al Bukhari (Malayalam: സയ്യിദ് ഇബ്റാഹീം ഖലീല്‍ അല്‍ ബുഖാരി) (Arabic: السيد ابراهيم الخليل البخاري) is the founder and chairman of Ma'din Academy and adviser of World Interfaith Harmony Week. He is a Sunni Islamic scholar, joint secretary of Samastha Kerala Jamiyyathul Ulama, general secretary of Kerala Muslim Jamaat, a body of various Muslim organizations in Kerala and listed in The Muslim 500.

== Birth and family background ==
Sayed Ibraheem Khaleel Bukhari Thangal was born in 1964 in a family of scholars in Kadalundi, a village in Kozhikode district, Kerala, India to Sayed Ahmed Bukhari Thangal Bukhari belongs to one of the oldest settled Thangal families in Kerala, their ancestor Sayyid Ahmad Jalaluddin Bukhari (d. 1589 AD) had migrated from North India in the 16th century to Kerala, Bukhari is a 10th generation descendant of him. Sayyid Ahmad Jalaluddin Bukhari's ancestors had arrived in the Indian subcontinent from Bukhara in Central Asia, settling in Uch, Bahawalpur, he was an 11th generation descendant of Jalaluddin Surkh-Posh Bukhari who descended from Ali al-Hadi who fled from Medina to Samarra to escape persecution of the Abbasid Caliph al-Mutawakkil in 848 AD.

== Early life and education ==
He acquired primary education from his parents especially from his father Sayed Ahmed Bukhari, the spiritual guide of that region. Under the guidance of Beeran Koya Musliyar, he pursued his higher education and graduated with 2nd rank in Islamic Theology (MFB) from Baqiyat Salihat Arabic College in Tamil Nadu, India.

Immediately after completing his graduation in 1997, he established Ma'din Academy at Swalath Nagar in Malappuram. He has traveled world-wide, lectured to thousands, and composed several works spanning education and contemporary issues. Now in Ma'din under his supervision 22,000 students are gaining their education in about 28 institutions ranging from primary to postgraduate level. He is respectfully referred to as Sayyid Bukhari

== Positions ==
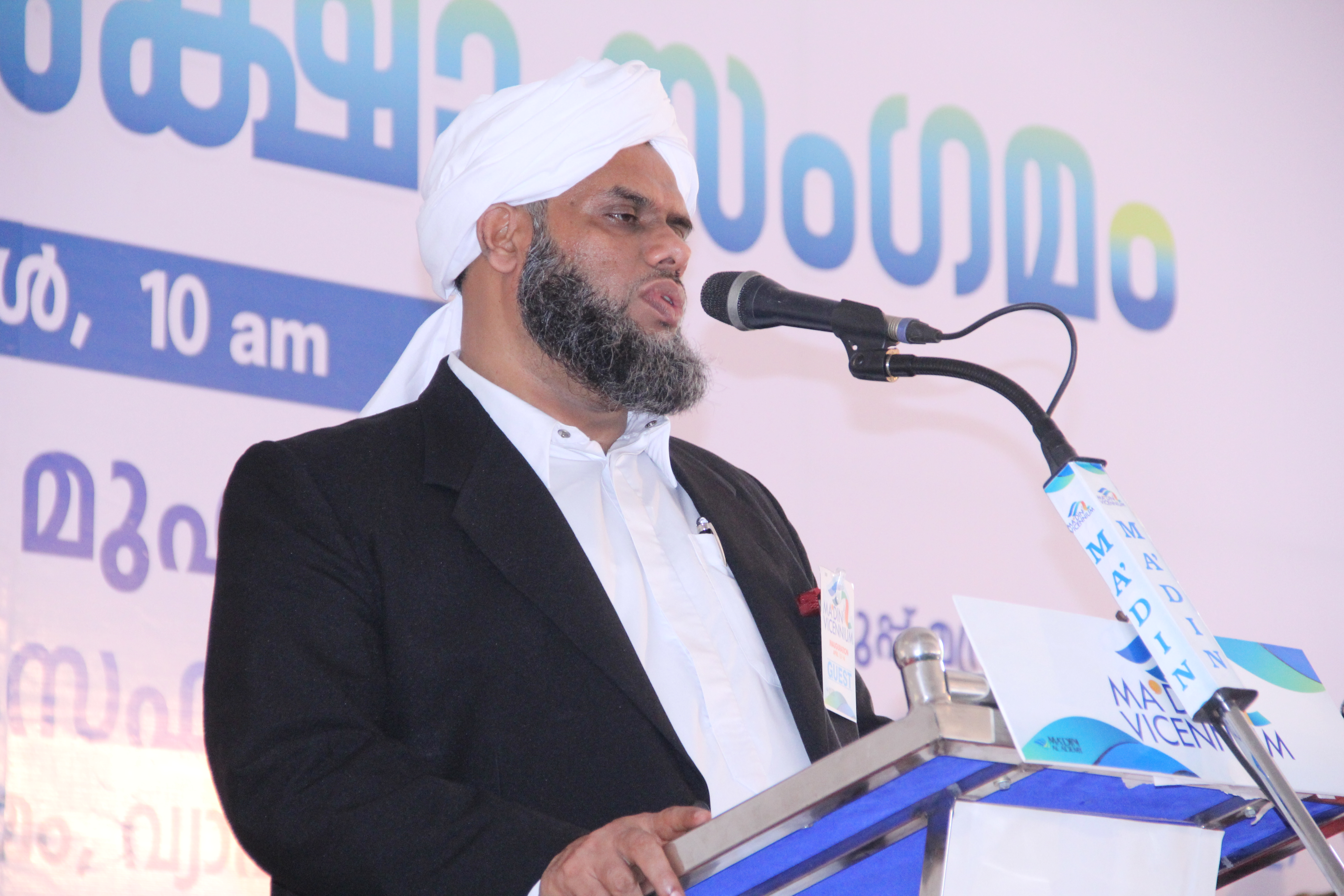
Sayyid Ibraheem Khaleel Al Bukhari

- Managing editor, The Journal Armonia, an international journal for pluralism and holistic education. The vision of Armonia is ‘to help bring together the best of all civilizations and religions in order to apply their common wisdom in promoting the harmonious pursuit of peace, prosperity, and freedom for all persons and communities through compassionate justice’.
- He has been selected one among the 500 most influential Muslims of the world (Muslims 500), published jointly by the Royal Islamic Strategic Studies Centre in Amman, Jordan and Prince Al-Waleed Bin Talal Center for Muslim-Christian Understanding at Georgetown University in the United States, from 2012 -2019.
- Advisor, International Interfaith Harmony Initiative, Malaysia.
- General secretary, Kerala Muslim Jama’at the umbrella body of various Muslim organizations.
- Vice president of Islamic Educational Board of India (New Delhi), which runs educational institutions in India and various Asian and African countries like UAE, Saudi Arabia, Oman, Qatar, Bahrain, Malaysia, Singapore, Sri Lanka, Malawi and Tanzania.

== International representations ==
- Global Business and Peace Conference, Seoul in South Korea in 2018.
- Active collaborator of G20 Interfaith Forum
- Lead the Indian delegation to the Vatican to attend the Interfaith meetings conducted by Pontifical Council for Inter religious Dialogue in September 2014.
- Advisor, Interfaith Harmony Seminar and Award Ceremony conducted in Malaysia on 1 March 2012.
- Special Observer in Global Moderates Movement Conference, Kuala Lampur, Malaysia in January 2012.

== Achievements ==
- Hosted G20 Interfaith Summit Conference (South Asia)
- He has been leading India's largest Ramadan Peace Conference from 2000 onwards. The conference is held on the 26th day of Ramzan every year. The conference attracts hundreds of thousands of people from various parts of the globe. The main highlight of this conference is Pledge against Terrorism.
- Planned and executed the Knowledge Hunt, an innovative learning programme which takes a group of researchers and scholars to various cultural and religious destinations of the globe. The programme covered China, Malaysia, Indonesia, Brunei, Uzbekistan, Syria, Jordan, Palestine and Egypt.

== See also ==
- Kanthapuram A. P. Aboobacker Musliyar
