= Abdul Hakkim Azhari =

Islamic scholar, educationalist

Muhammed Abdul Hakkim Azhari
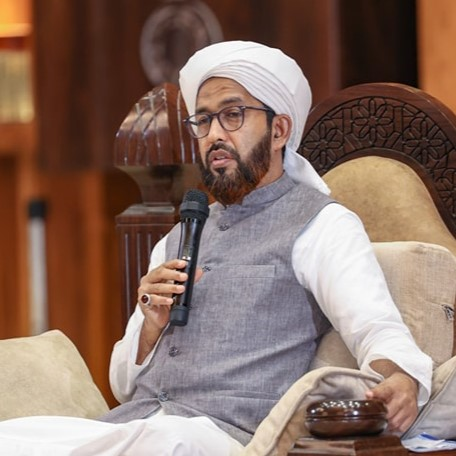
- Azhari addressing the Suhba Camp at Markaz Knowledge City

Managing Director of Markaz Knowledge City

Founder and Rector of Madeenathunnoor

Personal life
- Parent: Kanthapuram A. P. Aboobacker Musliyar (father)
- Education: Al-Azhar University; Ambedkar University Delhi; Markazu Saqafathi Sunniyya
- Website: drmahazhari.com

Religious life
- Religion: Islam
- Denomination: Sunni
- Jurisprudence: Shafi‘i

Muhammed Abdul Hakkim Azhari (also known as MAH Al Kandi) د. محمد عبد الحكيم الكاندي is an Islamic scholar, educationalist and the managing director of the Markaz Knowledge City. He is the President of Samastha kerala Sunni Yuvajana Samkham, Member of samastha Kerala Jamiyyathul Ulama Kendra Mushavara, former General Secretary of the Samastha Kerala Sunni Yuvajana Samgam (SYS) and the founder and director of Jamia Madeenathunnoor, Poonoor.

== Early life and education ==
Abdul Hakim Azhari is the son of Islamic scholar Kanthapuram A. P. Aboobacker Musliyar. He studied at the Babasaheb Bhimrao Ambedkar Bihar University, in Bihar and the Jamia Markaz under Markazu Saqafathi Sunniyya in Kerala. He completed a short-term diploma program at Al-Azhar University in Cairo.

== Career ==
Azhari has established educational institutions in various parts of Kozhikode. In 2001, he established Jamia Madeenathunnoor in Poonoor, Kozhikode. His organisation Sunni Yuvajana Sangam said in 2015 that they planned to open a hundred schools in Uttar Pradesh with a focus on primary education. Azhari is the rector of Jamia Markaz under Markazu Saqafathi Sunniyya.

Azhari is the managing director of Markaz Knowledge City, a residential and educational hub near Kozhikode city. He supervised the establishment of Alif Global school. He said in a conference that "Our duty is to spread this message of Islam to save humanity from darkness."

== Writing ==
His books include a Shama’il-u-nabi – Anudhavanathinte Anandam: thirunabiyude jeevitha pakarppukal (trans. The Joy of Emulation: the Life of Prophet Muhammed ﷺ – which is one of the best sellers in Malayalam language and translated into various local and international languages;

- Biography- Vismaya Vilasam (trans: The Holy Address: Biography of Shaikh Ahmed Raza Khan Barelvi)
- Travelogue - Bosfarasinte Bagyam (trans. The Fortune of Bosporus)
- Essays– Thiru kesham- madeenayude sammanam (trans. The Holy Relics of Prophet Muhammed ﷺ),Hridaya Bhashyam
- Study– Qasedathul Burda; (trans. A Study on Qaseedathul Burda); the translation of Dr. Usama al-Azhari’s al- Haqq al-Mubeen fi raddi ala man tala’ba fi dheen (trans. Bheegarathayude adiverukal, The Roots of Extremism)
- Children's Series-Bedtime Stories: From the Life of Prophet Muhammad ﷺ and His Companions
