= Markaz Law College =

Law school in Kozhikode, India

- മര്‍കസ് ലോ കോളജ്‌
- Type: law college
- Established: October 11 2014
- Parent institution: Markazu Saquafathi Sunniyya
- Affiliations: University of Calicut
- Chairman: Sheikh Abubakr Ahmad
- Vice-Chancellor: Hussain Saquafi Chullikkod
- Principal: Prof. Anju Pillai
- Location: Kozhikode, Kerala, India; 11.47310°N 76.0064°E
- Website: Website

Markaz Law College, is a centre of higher legal education in Kozhikode, India. The law college is the first project launched under the Knowledge City of Markazu Saquafathi Sunniyya, the college is affiliated to the University of Calicut and is recognised by the Bar Council of India. It offers integrated five-year course BBA with Bachelor of Laws and three-year course LLB.

== See also ==
- List of educational institutions in Kozhikode district
