= Ahmadpur, Uttar Pradesh =

Village in Uttar Pradesh, India

Ahmadpur
- Village
- Location in Uttar Pradesh#Location in India Ahmadpur (India)
- Coordinates: 25°27′19.091″N 81°40′58.901″E
- Country: India
- State: Uttar Pradesh

Government
  - Body: Gram panchayat

Population
  - Total: 10,000

Languages
  - Official: Hindi
- Time zone: UTC+5:30 (IST)
- Postal code: 225412
- Vehicle registration: 41
- Nearest city: Barabanki, Lucknow
- Website: up.gov.in

Ahmadpur is a medium-sized village It is located in the district Barabanki of Uttar Pradesh, the northern province of India. Its population is estimated to be about 10,000. Before its establishment there was forest, where the small war was fought between Sayed Salar Masood Gazi's forces and tribal forces in 1032 CE.Historical records start with an ancient unknown mazar (mausoleum) or mosque called Rozahi, situated northwest of the Ahmadpur.

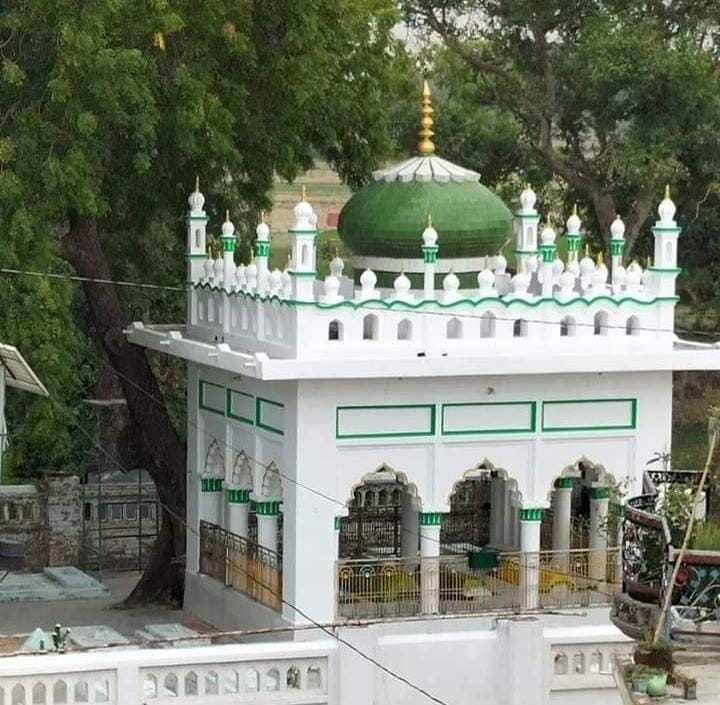
Tomb of Sayed Meera Mahmood Muhakkikul Akbar at Telyani, Ahmadpur

Sayed Meera Mahmood Muhakkikul Akbar (famous as Dada Miyan, a famous Sufi saint from Nisapur, a city in Iran) came to India and gave spiritual teachings to people. His mazar is situated at Mohalla Talyani, at the end of the village. Haji Abdul Quadeer is Sajjadah Nasheen and proforming all activities related with the Dargah shareef. Sufi saint, Sayed Alauddin Muhammad Gauri, came to Ahmadpur from Afghanistan under the reign of Alauddin Khalji. His mazar is situated behind Eak Minara Masjid and is called "Peer Gauri." In 1974, the Grand Mufti of India, Mustafa Raza Khan Qadri (also called Mufti E Azam Hind) traveled to Ahmadpur twice and stayed for three days.

Islamic Madrasa Islamia Ahle Sunnat Mazharul Uloom, established before 1936, is located in the middle of Ahmadpur village. Jama Masjid, which is famous as Bari Masjid, (1835) is the largest mosque of village.There are three other mosques present in the region. The oldest one is Gauri Masjid or Eik Minara Masjid (1580s), followed by Madina Masjid(1890) and Faisal Masjid. Ancient Kabristan is present outside of the village called 'Bitahri.' In the month of Muharram, majlis known as "Jasn-e-Imam Hussain" are organized. On the tenth day of Muharram, Ashura, processions used to march around the kasbah, ending at Karbala beside Edgah.The Chahullum-Mela is Ahmadpur's main celebration, held annually on the 20th of Safar. There are also processions and celebrations on the 12th of Rabi-ul-Awal, Prophet Muhammad's day of birth. On Thursdays and Sundays, a large market is organized in the middle of the village. Visitors from surrounding small villages often visit to shop.

Eid, Bakreed, Muharram (Yome Ashura), Id-e-Milad, Chahullum and Urs of Dada-Miya are festivals and programs of Ahmadpur.

A primary school for grades 1 through 8 has just been established in the village. A Government Intermediate College is also present.

On the crossing from the village to the Faizabad National Highway, there is a toll booth, Ahmadpur Toll Plaza.
