= Unnikulam =

- Gram Panchayat
- Location in Kerala, India Unnikulam (India)
- Coordinates: 11°25′0″N 75°55′0″E
- Country: India
- State: Kerala
- District: Kozhikode

Area
  - Total: 38.26 km^{2} (14.77 sq mi)

Population (2011)
  - Total: 24,912
  - Density: 1,051/km^{2} (2,720/sq mi)

Languages
  - Official: Malayalam, English
- Time zone: UTC+5:30 (IST)
- PIN: 673574
- Vehicle registration: KL-76
- Nearest city: Kozhikode
- Literacy: 92.04%
- Lok Sabha constituency: Kozhikode
- Vidhan Sabha constituency: Balussery
- Website: www.unnikulamonline.com

Unnikulam is a Gram Panchayat in Kozhikode district in the state of Kerala, India. It is further divided into two revenue villages, Unnikulam and Shivapuram.Unnikulam Online is the First Online News Portal From Unnikulam And second news portal is [Unnikulam News]. Important small towns in this Panchayat are Ekarool, the capital town and Poonoor . State Highway 34 (Kerala) passes through the Panchayat, connecting these two towns.

== Demographics ==
As of 2011 India census, Unnikulam had a population of 24912 with 11860 males and 13052 females.

== Schools ==
- Ishaath Public School

== See also ==
- Neroth, Kozhikode
