= All India Sunni Jamiyyathul Ulama =

Sunni scholarly body in India

- Type: Sunni scholarly council
- Location: India
- General Secretary: Kanthapuram A. P. Aboobacker Musliyar

All India Sunni Jamiyyathul Ulama, or All India Muslim Scholars Association, is an organisation of Islamic scholars in India.

Kanthapuram A. P. Aboobacker Musliyar currently serves as the general secretary of All India Sunni Jamiyyathul Ulama. He also leads the Markazu Saquafathi Sunniyya in Kozhikode in Kerala, India.

On 1 February 2015 Siraj daily reported the following:

More members were appointed to the national leadership of the All India Sunni Jem-iyyathul Ulama. Maulana Tauqeer Razakhan Barelvi, Maulana Maqbul Ahmad Swadiq Misbahi, Maulana Muazzam Ahmad Fatehpuri, Maulana Sharfaraz Ahmad, Dr. Mumtaz Aala Razvi and Syed Javed Ahmed were elected as members to the existing national council.

== Wings ==
- Scholarly bodies
  - Samastha Kerala Jem-iyyathul Ulama affiliated to All India Sunni Jamiyyathul Ulama
  - Kerala Muslim Jama'ath
- Mahallu federation — Sunni Management Association
- Educational board
  - Samastha Kerala Sunni Vidhyabhyasa Board
  - Islamic Educational Board of India
- Madrasa teachers' association — Sunni Jamiyyathul Muallimeen
- Youth wing — Samastha Kerala Sunni Yuvajana Sangham (SYS)
- Student wing — Sunni Students Federation (SSF)
- Children's wing — Sunni Bala Sangham (Let' Smile)
- Mouthpiece (daily) — Siraj
