= Pathady =

- Town
- Location in Kerala, India Pathady (India)
- Coordinates: 08°55′45″N 76°55′05″E
- Country: India
- State: Kerala
- District: Kollam

Languages
  - Official: Malayalam, English
- Time zone: UTC+5:30 (IST)
- PIN: 691312
- Telephone code: 0475
- Vehicle registration: KL-02, KL-25 footnotes =
- Nearest city: Kollam, Thiruvananthapuram.
- Literacy: 100%

Pathady / pathadi is a village about 6 km east from Anchal town (Anchal - Kulathupuzha road), east of Kollam district, Kerala state, India.

== Location ==
- 'Kanjuvayal' the first junction from Anchal side,
- 'Elavinmoodu',
- 'Pathady' or 'East Pathady' the third Jn.

== Facts ==
- Country - India
- State - Kerala
- District - Kollam
- Taluk - Punalur
- Panchayath - Yeroor
- Village Office - Yeroor

== Politics ==
Patahdy is a part of the Punalur assembly constituency in Kollam (Lok Sabha constituency). Shri. P S SUPAL is the current MLA of Punalur. Shri.N. K. Premachandran is the current member of the parliament of Kollam.

== Overview ==
- Distance from District Capital Kollam - 42 km
- Distance from Nearest International Airport Thiruvananthapuram - 70 km
- The Nearest Railway Station is at Punalur - 18 km
- The Nearest Major Bus Station is at Anchal - 6 km
- Major Crops are Coconut, Tapiocca & Rubber tree plantation.
- About 75% of south side of this village is of rubber estates.
- Post Office- Bharatheepuram
- Yeroor Village Office - 2 km

== Attractions ==
Adappupara, named after the shape of the rock formation, is one of the main attractions for people from different parts of religion and is managed by the Yeroor Muslim Jamaath. The footprints on the rock is considered to be holy and believed to be of the Muslim traveler Masoud Awliya.

== Language & Religion ==
The Spoken Language is Malayalam, In this village Muslims, Hindus and Christians live together. There are two Muslim Jamaat in Pathady; 1. Yeroor Muslim Jamaat - The first Jamaat in this village, and 2.Pathady Muslim Jamaat.

== Climate ==
Patahdy experiences a tropical monsoon climate (Köppen Am) with little seasonal variation in temperatures. December to March is the dry season with less than 60 millimetres or 2.4 inches of rain in each of those months. April to November is the wet season, with considerably more rain than during December to March, especially in June and July at the height of the Southwest Monsoon.
