= Neroth, Kozhikode =

Neroth
- village
- Location in Kerala, India Neroth (India)
- Coordinates: 10°4′0″N 76°28′0″E
- Country: India
- State: Kerala
- District: Kozhikode

Government
  - Member of Parliament: M.K.Raghavan (UDF)
  - Member of Assembly: Adv.P.T.A Rahim (Ind)

Languages
  - Official: Malayalam, English
- Time zone: UTC+5:30 (IST)
- PIN: 673574
- Telephone code: 0496
- Vehicle registration: KL-
- Nearest city: Kozhikode
- Lok Sabha constituency: Kozhikode

Neroth is a small village in Unnikulam Gram panchayat in the Kozhikode district, state of Kerala, India. The name Neroth is given to many other villages in Kerala and even there is a municipality called Neroth in German district of Rhineland-Palatinate.

Neroth is about 3 km away from Poonoor town and same distance away from Elettil Vattoli town. The village is known with the name of old Poonoor Govt. High school (Now named as GHSS Poonoor).

A coir factory operated in Neroth years ago and has since closed. The decomposed waste of the coir factory can be seen as brown hill on ach side of the Neroth - Mangad road. When it catches fire it becomes a threat to the people and the coconut trees. An attempt to convert the waste to fertilizers was unsuccessful.

There are few small scale industries like AM Bar Soap and Toyo Paints based in this village. Neroth is the home for famous RP family of Kerala. There is a very old Mangad Juma Masjid, Neroth Salafi masjid and vadakke neroth Juma masjid also situated in neroth and a Hindu temple named mangad kovilakam

== Schools ==
- GHSS Poonoor
- Mangad AUPS School
