= Markazi =

Markazi (Persian: مركزئ), meaning "Central", may refer to:

- Markazi province, Iran
- Markazi Rural District, Bushehr Province, Iran
- Markazi Bihsud District, Maidan Wardak, Afghanistan
- Markazi Masjid, Dewsbury, England
- Arash Markazi, Iranian-American sports journalist

== See also ==
- Markaz (disambiguation)
