= E Sulaiman Musliyar =

President Samastha Kerala Jamiyyathul Ulama

Principal Ihyaussunna Othukkungal

Personal details
- Born: 1942 (age 83–84) Chengani, Malappuram
- Education: Post Graduation (Islamic Studies)
- Occupation: Islamic scholar

E Sulaiman Musliyar (born 1942) is an Islamic scholar from Kerala, India. He is President of Samastha Kerala Jem-iyyathul Ulama, the body of Sunni-Shafi'i scholars in Kerala and he is the Principal of Ihyaussunna, Othukkungal, Malappuram.
