= 2011 Popular Front of India social justice conference =

- Poster advertising the conference
- Location: New Delhi, India

On 26 and 27 November 2011, a conference based on the theme "Build the Nation on Justice" was held at the Ramlila Maidan in New Delhi, India. The event was organized by Popular Front of India, an Islamist organisation. The Conference became a get together of like minded organizations and movements which strive for the common goals of justice, security and empowerment. The first day of the conference had two separate seminar sessions on the topics ‘Together for Empowerment’ and ‘People’s Right to Justice’. The second day centered on a large public meeting, witnessed a large flow of masses for the Grand Public Meeting.

== Planning ==
The decision to host the conference was made at the two-day meeting of the National Executive Council of the Popular Front of India in New Delhi. An organizing committee was constituted for the conference, with Muhammad Ali Jinnah as general convener and Muhammad Shafi and Muhammad Roshan as conveners. A PFI Press release said K. M. Shareef, General Secretary of Popular Front, PFI Chairman E.M. Abdul Rahiman, Moulana Usman Baig, Moulana Kalimullah Rashadi, Adv. K. P. Muhammad Shareef and others participated.

=== Inauguration ===
The inauguration ceremony of Social Justice Conference campaign was conducted at the Nehru Maidan, Mangalore on 11 October. K M Shareef, National General Secretary, inaugurated the programme by way of waving the flag of Popular Front of India. Dr. C. S. Dwarakanath, the former chairman of the State Backward Classes Commission, Ilyas Mohammed Tumbe, PFI state president; Venkataswamy, the president of Samata Sainik Dal; and P. B. D’Sa, the district PUCL president; and many others were also present.

The office of the Social Justice Conference was inaugurated at Vardhaman City Plaza 2, Asaf Ali Rd, Near Ramleela Maidan, New Delhi on 16 October by Moulana Nawabuddin Naqshbandi, Chairman Muslim Muthahida Mahaz. According to a press release issued by Mohammed Ali Jinnah, the Convenor of the Conference, the first copy of manifesto of the Social Justice Conference was issued by E. Aboobacker, the National President Social Democratic Party of India and the theme of the Social Justice Conference was delivered by Popular Front of India Chairman, E.M Abdul Rahiman.

== Conference events ==
=== 26 November ===
The Chairman of the Popular Front of India, E M Abdul Rahiman, flagged off the first day of the two-day conference. The showcase of the day was the Milli Convention christened "Together for Empowerment". In his inaugural speech by the Fathehpuri Shahi Imam, Mufthi Muhammed Mukharram, underlined the fact of continued exploitation of Muslims in India, irrespective of political party.

=== 27 November ===
Like the previous conferences, viz. the Empower India Conference in 2007 (Bangalore) and the National Political Conference of 2009 (Calicut), the SJC was populous. The conference drew citizens from across the nation, including both political and religious leaders.

Several prominent personalities attended. The former MP and president of the All-India Muslim Majlis-e-Mushawarath, Syed Shahabuddin, rightly recognized that the state of Muslims could not progress without adequate representation in Parliament and Assemblies. He further stated that the government represents merely 15-20% of the population; and they seem least concerned about the general problems and hardships of the commoner; he described the situation as "Government of the elite, for the elite". He demanded reservation for Muslims in Parliament and Assemblies.

The Shahi Imam of Shahi Masjid Fathepuri, Mufti Mukarram Ahmed said "When Justice Rajinder Sachar Committee and Justice Ranganath Mishra Commission reports have said that Muslims are even more deprived than the Scheduled Castes in the country and recommended reservation for them, there should be no reason for delay. The present regime is not willing to give Muslims their due. The need of the hour is to assert our right. We cannot afford to bear this injustice any longer."

The Samjawadi Party head, Mulayam Singh Yadav, claimed that the intention of present regime was not good. Committees and reports have been formed, but they shy away from implementing them. "If Muslims are united & awakened, the government will be forced to accept their demands."

The Ajmer Shareef Khadim, Syed Chisty said that Muslims have preached and practiced secularism for ages, and lambasted the accusation of terrorism on the community as a whole. He asked community leaders not to go into defensive mode during any “terror” incident. He also asked the Muslims not to simply blame the government for all woes; an introspection into the Muslim household should be done citing the high percentage of school drop outs. Education, he said, is the key – ensuring it is a need.

The gathering ended with the Delhi Declaration.

== Delhi Declaration ==
The leaders who gathered in Delhi on 27 November spoke of the contemporary and pressing matters of the common Indian citizen, especially the minorities.

Prominent points from the Declaration:

- Detailed overhaul of the current neo-liberal & pro-rich economic policies with a view to restore the concepts of welfare state where in the state is not merely a passive observer.
- Building up of an inclusive people's movement for the eradication of corruption at all levels.
- Development of eco-friendly development programmes which will not contribute to global warming and environmental desolation.
- Implementation of Justice Ranganatha Mishra Commission report, to ensure proportionate representation in constitutional organs, bureaucracy public undertakings and education.
- Legislation for proportional representation instead of the existing first-past - the post system
- Reformulation of the foreign policy with avowed objective of establishing peace and cooperation on the subcontinent along with the revival of the Non-Aligned Movement

The delegates at the Conference also reiterated their commitment to establish a New India of Equal Rights to all Indians. This was the same pledge made on the occasion of the launch of Popular Front of India in the Empower India Conference held at Bangalore in 2007.
