= Markaz Knowledge City =

Knowledge City
- Township
- Markaz Knowledge City
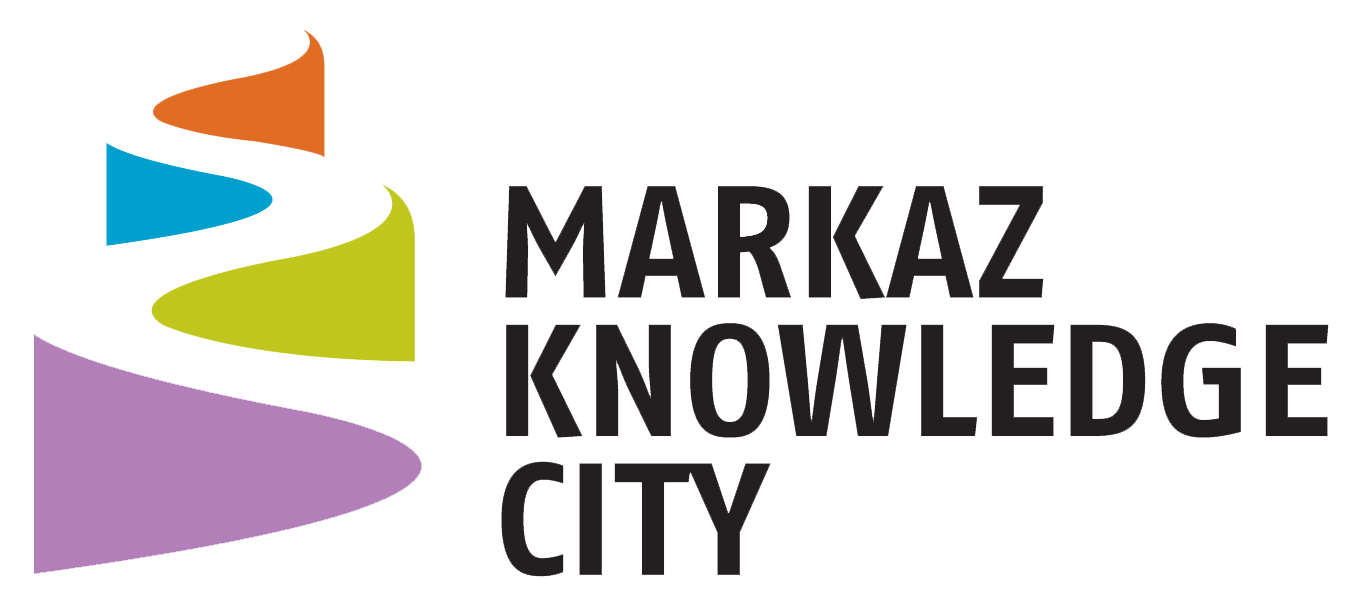
- Nickname: MKC
- Motto: Way to Wisdom
- Location in Kerala, India Knowledge City (India)
- Coordinates: 11.47227°N 76.007638°E
- Country: India
- State: Kerala
- District: Kozhikode
- Established: 24 December 2012; 13 years ago
- in: Kaithapoyil near Thamarassery, Kozhikode Kerala, India
- Boroughs: List: WIRAS

Government
  - Body: Markazu Ssaqafathi Ssunniyya
  - Chairman: Sheikh Abubakr Ahmad
  - Managing Director: Abdul Hakeem Azhari
  - Chief executive officer: Dr. Abdul Salam
- Website: www.markazknowledgecity.com

Markaz Knowledge City is a private planned city built near Kozhikode in Kerala, India. The foundation stone for the project was laid by Taj-ul Ulama Sayyid Abdurrahman Albukhari on 24 December 2012. Sheikh Abubakr Ahmad is the chairman of the city and Abdul Hakeem Azhari is its managing director.

== Education ==
- School of Business Management
- Markaz International School
- Digital Bridge International
- Alif Global School
- Avaan Institute of Management Education and Research (AIMER Kozhikode)
- Hillsinai Center of Excellence
- Hillsinai IAS Academy (Under Vedhik IAS Academy)
- Hisab School of Commerce (CA, CMA, CS)
- Hillsinai Finishing School
- WIRAS (World Institute for Research in Advanced Studies)
- Malaibar Foundation
- Hogar Technologies Innovation
- Malabar and Islamic heritage Museum
- Library and research club and publications
- Markaz Unani Medical College (The first unani medical college in Kerala.)

=== Markaz Law College ===
Markaz Law College is a centre of higher legal education in Kozhikode. The college is affiliated to the University of Calicut and is recognized by the Bar Council of India. It offers integrated five-year course BBA with Bachelor of Laws and three-year course LLB.

== Health care ==
- Markaz Unani Medical Hospital
- Tigris Valley
- 5 Star Wellness Center

== Others ==
- Jamiul Futuh - The Indian Grand Masjid
- Fezinn Hotels
- M Tower
- Valencia Galleria - Exhibition Centre
- Talenmark Souk
- Cultural Centre
- Mihras Hospital
- Unani Medical College
- Aimer Business School
- Tigris valley - Wellness Centre
- Alif Global School
- Malaibar Centre for Research and Development

== Location ==
It is located at National Highway 766 (India).

== Transportation ==
Knowledge city connects to other parts of India through Kozhikode city on the west and Thamarassery town on the east. National highway No.66 passes through Kozhikode and the northern stretch connects to Goa and Mumbai. The southern stretch connects to Kochi and Thiruvananthapuram. The eastern National Highway No.54 going through Adivaram connects to Kalpetta, Mysuru and Bengaluru. The nearest airports are at Kozhikode and Kannur. The nearest railway station is at Kozhikode.

== See also ==
- Kanthapuram A. P. Aboobacker Musliyar
- Markaz Law College
- Shahre Mubarak Grand Masjid
- Markazu Saqafathi Sunniyya
- Markaz, Dubai
