= Swalath Nagar =

Village in Malappuram district

Swalath Nagar is a village in Malappuram city in the state of Kerala, India. It's located on NH 966 towards Calicut Road. Swalath Nagar was named in 1997 after Ma'din came into existence. The word Swalath means praising or praying over prophet in Arabic and Nagar referred to any place. There is a monthly spiritual event is held here under Ma'din in which Swalath are recited, thus this place named after

Ma'din is headquartered at Swalath Nagar and their main campus is located at Swalath Nagar. Swalath Nagar consists of Ma'din Public School, Ma'din Grand Masjid, Ma'din Head Office, Ma'din Special School, Ma'din Kulliyya of Islamic Science and Ma'din Model Academy. India's largest Ramadan prayer meet is held at Swalath Nagar.
