= Ma'din =

Aim-Learning, teaching and research

Ma'din Academy
- Other names: Jamia Ma'din, Ma'din Swalath Nagar
- Motto: Ma'din makes tomorrow
- Type: Educational Institution
- Established: 6 June 1997
- Founder: Sayyid Ibraheem Khaleel Al Bukhari
- Religious affiliation: Islam
- Chairman: Sayyid Ibraheem Khaleel Al Bukhari
- Location: Swalath Nagar, Malappuram, Kerala, 676517, India
- Campus: Swalath Nagar
- Website: madin.edu.in

Ma'din Academy registered as Ma'dinu Ssaquafathil Islamiyya under Societies Registration Act of 1860. No: 1004/99, established in 1997, is an institution in India which runs 45 educational institutions and charity with 25,000 students. Its headquarters is located in Malappuram, Kerala, India. It operates various facilities such as an orphanage, schools, colleges, and a technical centre. As a Sunni educational institute, it is recognised by the Kerala government and registered under society act. Ma'din conducts various programs with the theme of interfaith harmony and tolerance. Ma'din is a partner in G20 Interfaith Summit held every year. To promote harmony and tolerance Ma'din releases an international journal named Armonia.

== International Presences ==
- Ma'din's delegates attended at Global Business and Peace Conference held in Seoul, South Korea in 2018 and presented a token to former UN Secretary-General Ban Ki-moon.
- Ma'din signed memorandum of understanding with Dar al-Mustafa, Yemen. Ma'din chairman Sayyid Ibraheem Khaleel Al Bukhari signed the MoU with Dar al-Mustafa founder Umar bin Hafiz.
- Partnering with Commonwealth Conference 2018.

== Institutions under Ma'din ==
- Ma'din Public School
- Ma'din Polytechnic College
- Ma'din Arts and Science College
- Ma'din School for Visually Impaired
- Ma'din School for Hearing Impaired
- Ma'din School for Differently Abled
- Ma'din Spanish Academy
- Ma'din Kulliyya of Islamic Science
- Ma'din College of Islamic Da'wa
- Ma'din Sadath Academy
- Ma'din Higher Secondary School
- Ma'din She Campus
- Ma'din Q Land
- Ma'din Foreign Language Institutes
- Ma'din Tahfeezul Quran College
- Ma'din School of Excellence
- Ma'din Model Academy

== Ramadan Prayer Congregation ==
Ma'din organises an annual prayer meeting during Ramadan, which is reported to be the largest in India and the third largest in the world, after those held in Mecca and Medina. It is held at Swalath Nagar where Ma'din is headquartered on 27th of Ramadan. The Prayer Meet began in 1986. Last year's event was held on 21 June 2017.

The central attraction and the focal point of all activities where Ma'din takes its inspiration from is the Swalath congregation held on the last Thursday of every month which is led by Sayyid Ibraheemul Khaleel Al Bukhari with up to 600,000 people attending.

== Notable Events and Projects under Ma'din Academy ==
=== Agro Space ===
This is an agricultural program is being implemented to ensure self-sufficiency in farming and to promote non-toxic farming. It was initiated in 2009 as part of Encomium celebration of Ma'din with the aim of having a kitchen garden in every home.

=== Goats and Cages (Malayalam: ആടും കൂടും) ===
It is an animal farming scheme comes under Ma'din Agro Space Project as many as 500 goats and their cages are being distributed to poor families in the Ma'din neighborhood as part of the programme being implemented during the 20th anniversary year of the institution.

=== Fiesta Arabia ===
A events in the run-up to the UN Arabic Language Day celebrations.

=== Haj Camp ===
Ma'din conducts a Haj Camp for pilgrims going to Makkah for Haj every year. This year it held on 18 April 2018. As part of Haj Camp, this year Ma'din conducted a get-together for those who went for Haj in ship. Under this project, a website has been developed to help haj pilgrimages.
