= Markaz-e Garm =

Markaz-e Garm مرکزگرم
- Village
- Location within Iran
- Coordinates: 32°46′06″N 48°25′06″E
- Country: Iran
- Province: Khuzestan
- County: Andimeshk
- Bakhsh: Alvar-e Garmsiri
- Rural District: Qilab

Population (2006)
  - Total: 23
- Time zone: UTC+3:30 (IRST)
  - Summer (DST): UTC+4:30 (IRDT)

Markaz-e Garm (Persian: مرکزگرم, also Romanized as Markazgarm) is a village in Qilab Rural District, Alvar-e Garmsiri District, Andimeshk County, Khuzestan Province, Iran. At the 2006 census, its population was 23, in 5 families.
