= Ullal Thangal =

Indian Muslim leader (1920–2014)

Abdurahman Al Bukhari
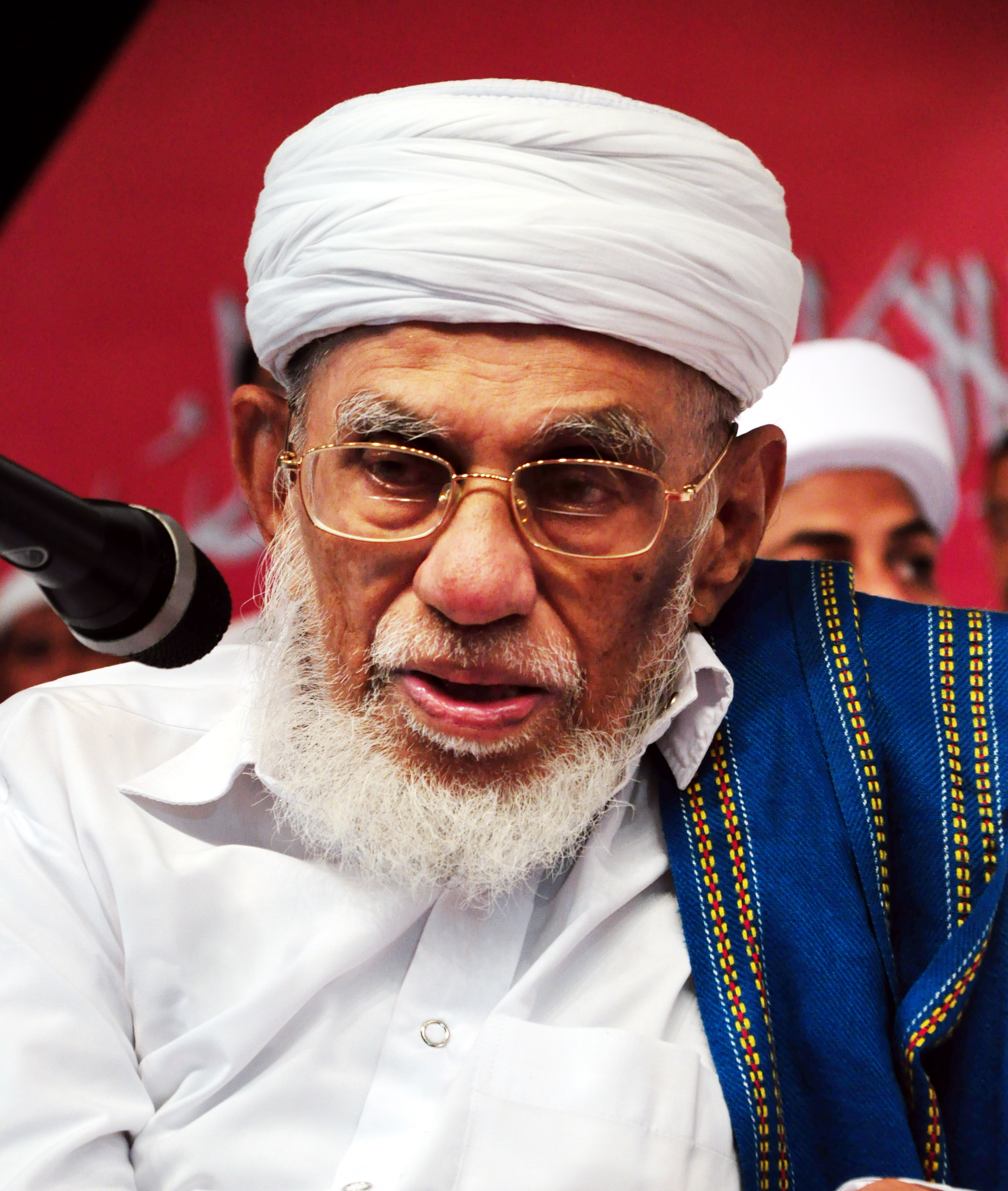
- 2013
- Title: Tājul Ulamā

Personal life
- Born: Sayyid ˈAbdur-Rahmān al-Bukhāri; 1920 Karuvanthuruthy, Kozhikode district, Kerala, India
- Died: 1 February 2014 (aged 93–94)
- Resting place: Ettikulam, Kannur, Kerala, India
- Spouse: Sayyidat Fatima
- Children: 7
- Education: Baqiyat Salihat Arabic College
- Occupation: Islamic scholar
- Website: www.seyyidmadaniullal.com/ullalthangal.php

Religious life
- Religion: Sunni Islam, Shafī school of thought

Sheikh Sayyid ˈAbdur-Rahmān al-Bukhāri(1920 – 1 February 2014), commonly known as Ullal Thangal and honoured with the title Tājul Ulamā lit. 'Crown Among the Clerics', was an Indian Islamic scholar. He was the president of Samastha, Jamia Sa-adiya Arabic College, Principal of the Sayyid Madani Arabic College, Ullal, and the Qazi of Ullal and several districts of Karnataka state.

He was a prominent vice president of the Samastha Mushawara until the split of the Samastha in 1989 and AP Samastha's president thereafter.

His grave is in Ettikulam, Kannur district of Kerala.

== Early life and education ==
He was born in Karuvanthuruthy, Faroke in Calicut District. He studied Islamic jurisprudence in the school of Shamsul Ulama and Kanniyyath Ahmed Musliyar. Later he went to Al Baqiat al Salihat, Vellore to peruse higher Islamic studies. After that he went to Ullal near Mangalore to serve in Sayyid Madani Arabic College and had been there for sixty years.
