= Grand Mufti of India =

Senior and influential religious authority of the Muslims in India

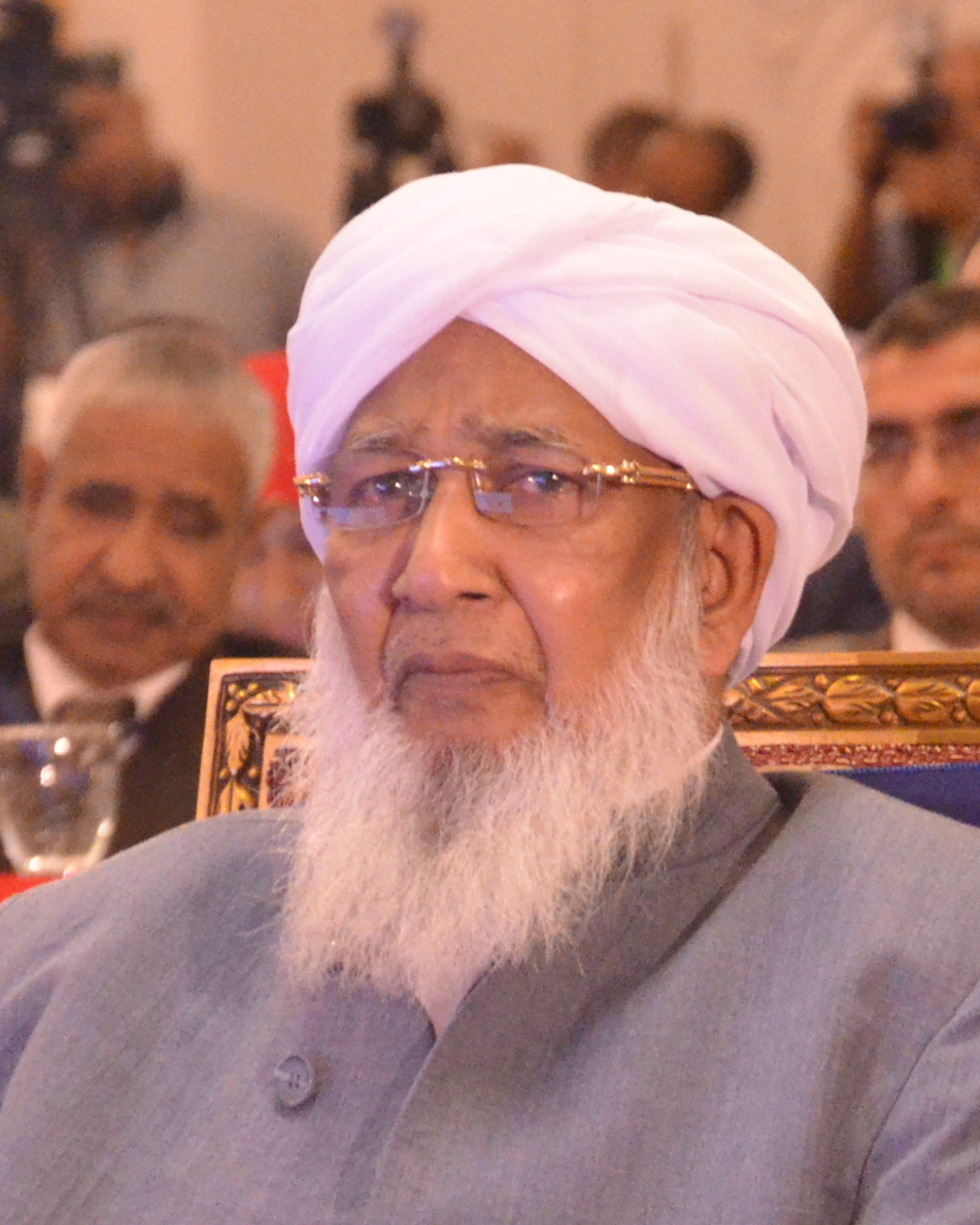
- Incumbent; Sheikh Abubakr Ahmad since 24 February 2019
- Office of the Grand Mufti of India
- Style: Mufti Azam-e-Hind
- Residence: Kozhikode
- Seat: Daryaganj, New Delhi 28.6468054°N 77.2448409°E
- Nominator: All India Tanzeem Ulama-e-Islam, All India Sunni Jamiyyathul Ulama
- Term length: No fixed term
- Inaugural holder: ʽAbd al-Qadir Badayuni
- Formation: Mughal Empire
- Unofficial names: Musliyar
- Website: Grand Mufti of India

The Grand Mufti of India is the most senior and influential religious authority of the Sunni Muslim Community of India. The incumbent is Sheikh Abubakr Ahmad, general secretary of All India Sunni Jamiyyathul Ulama, who was conferred the title in February 2019 at the Gareeb Nawaz Peace Conference held at Ramlila Maidan, New Delhi, organised by the All India Tanzeem Ulama-e-Islam. He has been listed among the 100 most influential Muslims in India- 2024 by Muslim Mirror.

== Role ==
The Grand Mufti of India is the Islamic authority in the country. His main role is to give opinions (fatwa) on Islamic legal matters and social affairs. The Grand Mufti is traditionally chosen from the Barelvi school of Sunni Islam.

== History ==
=== Mughal period ===
The first Grand Mufti of India, Shah Fazle Rasool Badayuni was appointed by the final Mughal Emperor, Bahadur Shah Zafar. Badayuni was a Hanafi scholar who had deep knowledge of Islamic jurisprudence. His Urdu statements on Islamic subjects were published as Tariqi Fatwa, which later became famous. His grandson `Abd al-Qadir Bada'uni followed him as the Grand Mufti.

=== British period ===
In the British ruling period, Islamic scholars noted Ahmed Raza Khan Barelvi who was the spiritual leader of Indian Muslims, scholar and revivalist. Thousands of students and scholars were attracted to his works and requested him to become Grand Mufti, but he declined. He wanted to be engaged with educational revival and writing. Instead, his student Amjad Ali Aazmi was elected. His book on Hanafi fiqh, Bahar-e-Shariat became a reference on this subject. Along with him, Mustafa Raza Khan Qadri s/o. Ahmed Raza Khan Barelvi was the Grand Mufti during Indira Gandhi's administration. He protested the Family Planning Program enacted by the government.

=== Grand Muftiship of Sheikh Abubakr Ahmad ===
Sheikh Abubakr Ahmad was sworn in as the Grand Mufti of India on 24 February 2019 at the Ramlila Maidan. He became the first Grand Mufti from south India.

== List of Grand Muftis of India ==
No.	Name (birth–death)	Madhhab	Place	Other works & activities	Notes
16th century - 17th century
1	ʽAbd al-Qadir Badayuni (21 August 1540 - 5 November 1615); ملا عبد القادر بدایونی (Arabic & Urdu)	Hanafi	Badaun	Author of Muntakhab-ut-Tawarikh (Arabic)	The Mughal emperor, Akbar, appointed him to the Muftiate in 1574 where he spent much of his career.
17th century
18th century
19th century
5	Shah Fazle Rasool Badayuni (1 July 1798 - 8 August 1872); شاہ فضلِ رسول قادری بدایونی (Urdu, his native language), شاه فضل رسول قدري بدایونی (Arabic)	Hanafi	Badaun	Author of Tarikhi-Fatwa (Urdu)	Badayuni was appointed by the final Mughal Emperor, Bahadur Shah Zafar.
20th century
6	Kifayatullah Dehlawi (November 1882 - 31 December 1952); مفتی اعظم محمد کفایت اللہ دہلوی (Urdu, his native language), مفتی کفایت اللہ الدہلوی(Arabic)	Hanafi	Shahjahanpur	Author of Kifayatul Mufti	
7	Amjad Ali Aazmi (November 1882 - 6 September 1948); صدر الشريعہ مفتى محمد امجد على اعظمى (Urdu, his native language), مفتى أمجد على أعظمى (Arabic)	Hanafi	Bareilly	Author of Bahar-e-Shariat (Urdu)	
8	Mustafa Raza Khan Qadri (18 July 1892 - 11 November 1981); مصطفٰی رضا خان قادری نوری (Urdu, his native language), مصطفى رضا خان القادري النوري (Arabic)	Hanafi	Bareilly	Author of Fatawa Mustawafiyah (Arabic)	
20th century - 21st century
9	Akhtar Raza Khan (23 November 1943 - 20 July 2018); تاج الشریعہ اختر رضا خان (Urdu, his native language), مفتي اختر رضا خان (Arabic)	Hanafi	Bareilly	Founder of Jamiatur Raza and Author of Fatawa Taajush Shariah (Arabic)	
21st century
10	Sheikh Abubakr Ahmad (1970); ശൈഖ് അബൂബക്ർ അഹ്‌മദ്‌ (Malayalam, his native language), الشيخ أبوبكر أحمد (Arabic)	Shafi'i	Kozhikode	General Secretary of All India Muslim Scholars Association	

== See also ==
- Islam in India
- Grand Mufti
- Ahmad Raza Khan
- Amjad Ali Aazmi
- Mustafa Raza Khan
- Akhtar Raza Khan
- Sheikh Abubakr Ahmad
