= Kanthapuram A. P. Aboobacker Musliyar =

Indian Islamic scholar

Dr. Sheikh Abubakr Ahmad
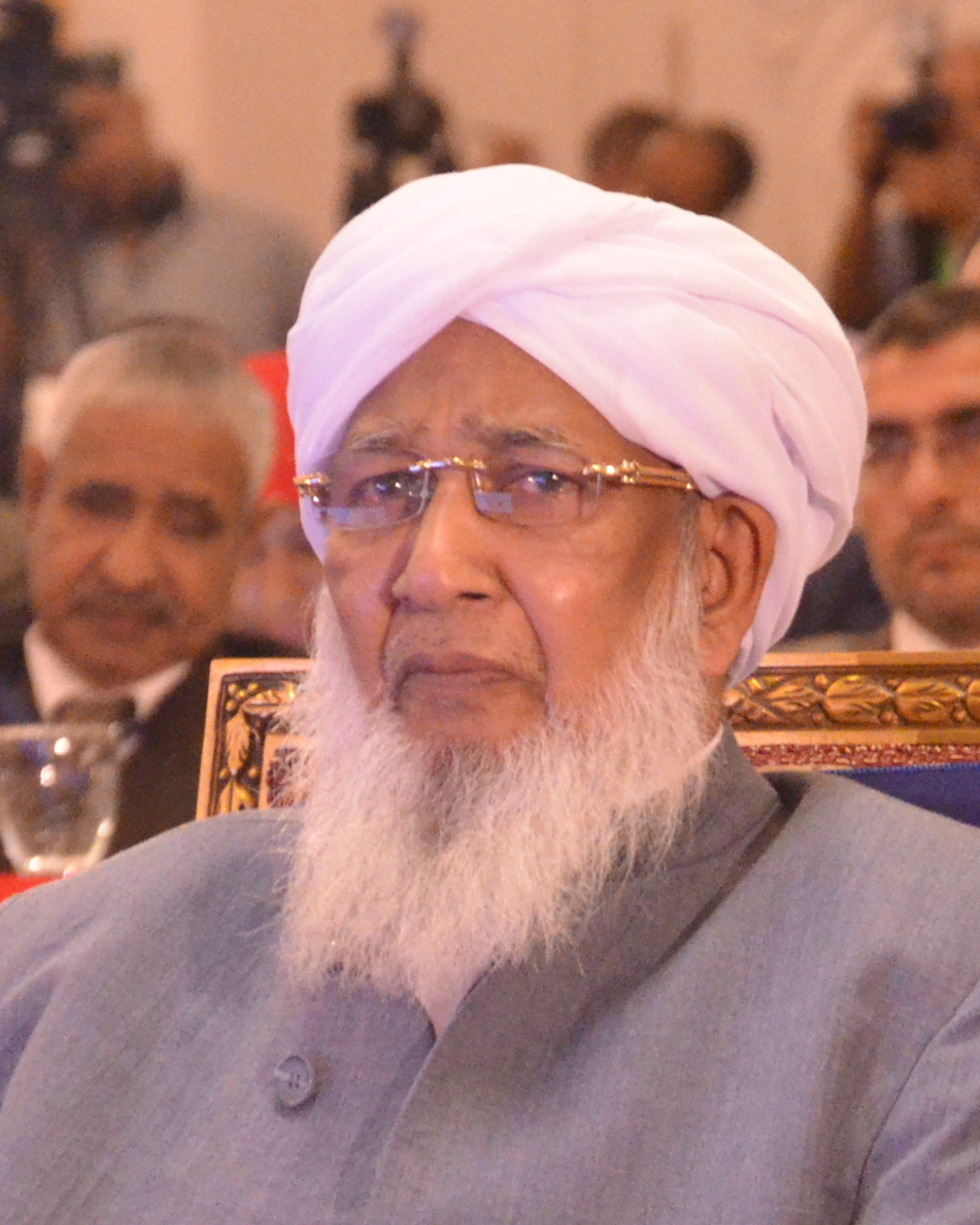
- Musliyar in 2015

Grand Mufti of India
- Incumbent
- Assumed office 24 February 2019
- Preceded by: Akhtar Raza Khan

Personal life
- Born: A. P. Aboobacker; 22 March 1939 (age 87) (Note: His data of birth is given twice in the current and May 2019 versions of the source, once as 22 March 1931 and once as 22 March 1939. This was a change from a 2018 version of the same source, which said 22 March 1939 in both places that mentioned his date of birth.1939 itself right.) Kanthapuram, Malabar District, Madras Presidency, British India (present-day Kozhikode, Kerala, India)
- Home town: Kanthapuram, Kozhikode, India
- Spouse: Zainab
- Notable works: Muhammad: The Messenger; Religion, Polity and Nationalism; The Mind of Islam
- Education: Musliyar Graduation; Maulvi ‘Aalim
- Known for: First to issue Fatwa against the IS
- Other name: A. P. Aboobacker Musliyar
- Honors: Listed in The 500 Most Influential Muslims (2009–2025)
- Website: sheikhabubakrahmad.com

Religious life
- Religion: Islam
- Denomination: Sunni
- Founder of: Markaz
- Jurisprudence: Shafi‘i
- Movement: Barelvi
- Pronunciation of Sheikh Abubakr Ahmad Updated on September 2019
- Grand Mufti styles
- Religious style: Mufti Azam-e-Hind, and Mufti al-Diyar al-Hindiyyah

Dr. Kanthapuram A. P. Aboobacker Musliyar (born 22 March 1939), officially known as Dr. Sheikh Abubakr Ahmad, (Note: Dr Sheikh Abubakr Ahmad (Šayḫ Abūbakr ʾAḥmad) is the official name of the Grand Mufti. The Sheikh, the first part of the name like the name of Prime Minister of Bangladesh, Sheikh Hasina, is not a honorific prefix. His official website is also sheikhabubakrahmad.com) is an Indian Islamic scholar and the current Grand Mufti of India for the Barelvi sect. He is General Secretary of the All India Sunni Jamiyyathul Ulama (the Indian Muslim Scholars Association) and General Secretary of Samastha Kerala Jem-iyyathul Ulama.

== Grand Mufti of India ==
Musliyar was chosen as the Grand Mufti of India by the All India Tanzeem Ulamae Islam in a programme conducted at Ramlila Maidan, in New Delhi. The title is associated with his recognition within the Sunni scholarly establishment and should not be understood as representing a universally recognised religious authority over all Muslims in India, who belong to diverse Islamic denominations, schools of thought and religious organisations. The previous Grand Mufti of Barelvis, Akhtar Raza Khan, had died from an illness on 20 July 2018. The inauguration of Musliyar took place on Sunday, 24 February 2019. It set a record attendance for any event held at Ramlila Maidan.

After his election conducted several receptions in various countries including the UAE, Bahrain, Kuwait, Oman, Malaysia and Indonesia especially at his birthplace in India, Kozhikode. The then Speaker of the Kerala Legislative Assembly P. Sreeramakrishnan, Kerala Minister T. P. Ramakrishnan, Karnataka Ministers U. T. Khader and Rahim Khan, and A. Pradeepkumar member of 14th Kerala Legislative Assembly, Kerala Haj Committee chairman C. Mohammed Faizi, Tamil Nadu Haj Committee chairman Haji Abdul Jabbar, Mayor of Kozhikode Thottathil Raveendran, Zamorin K. C. Unniyanujan Raja and Dr. M. G. S. Narayanan, politicians, religious and cultural leaders including from other Indian states participated in the civil reception.

== Peace and interfaith dialogue work ==
Musliyar has conducted and attended many national and international conferences for peace and interfaith dialogue.

He is the chairman of the Sheikh Zayed International Peace Conference and was one of the speakers at the First World Tolerance Summit, conducted by the International Institute for Tolerance Dubai, UAE. The tagline of the second Sheikh Zayed International Peace Conference was "Renaissance of the World Through Peace". In 2019 he attended Global Conference of Human Fraternity and met with Pope Francis, head of the Catholic Church.

In 2014 he launched a campaign to plant 100,000 trees throughout India as part of preparations for the Sheikh Zayed International Peace Conference, held in New Delhi.

== Educational revivalist ==
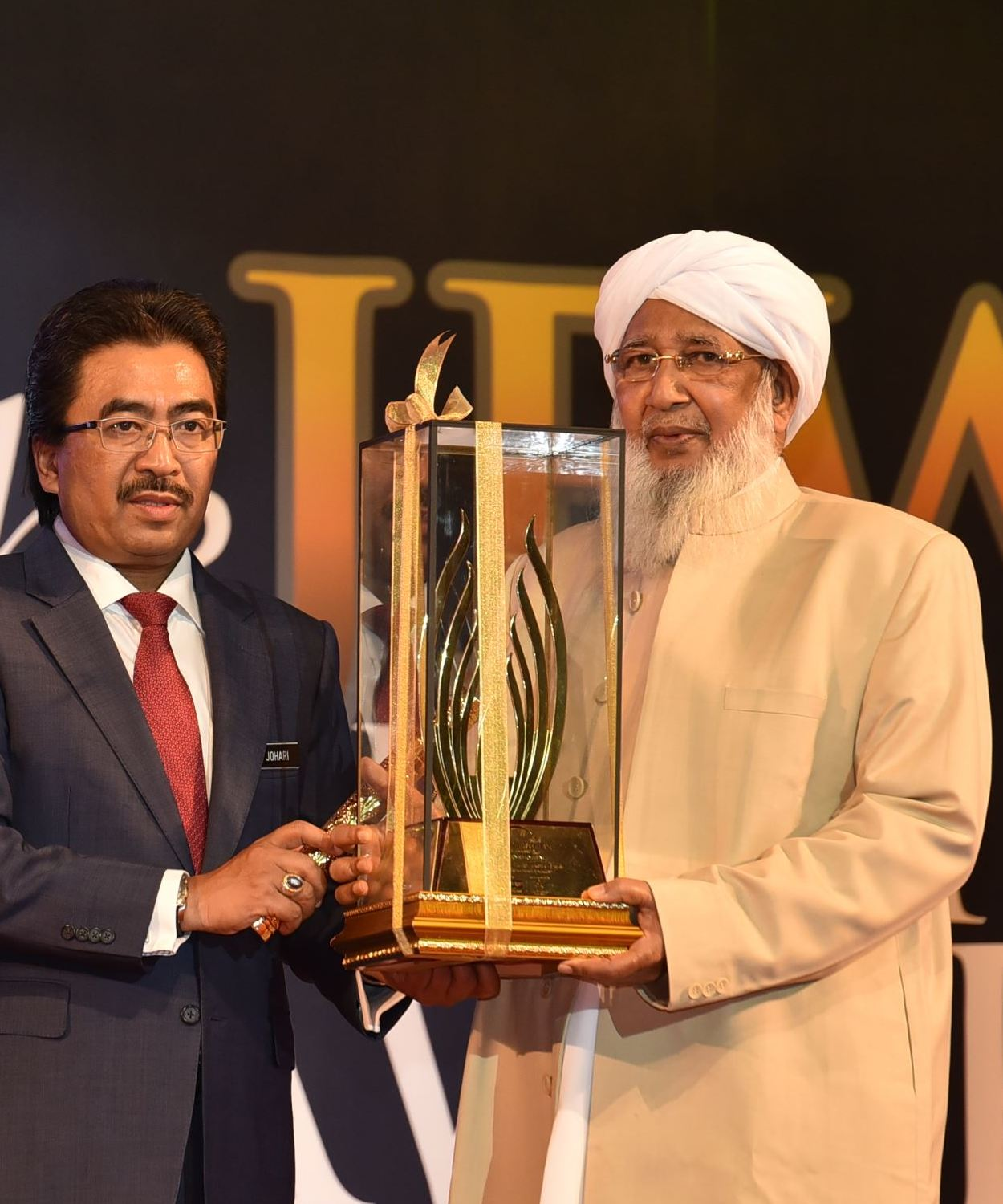
Musliyar receiving an award from the OIC

Musliyar educated several scholars from different parts of India. He is involved with Markaz Knowledge City, Markaz Unani Medical College & Hospital, and with higher education and research. He said in an interview with Khaleej Times that the "Education is key to peace".

== Views ==
Musliyar has condemned Islamic extremism. He says that "Militant groups such as the Islamic State (IS) are trying to defame a religion that advocates peace and tolerance." In November 2015, he commented on gender equality, saying: "Gender equality is something which is never going to be a reality. It is against Islam, humanity and was intellectually wrong." He said, "only a woman can give birth", although some media outlets misquoted him as saying women are only capable of childbirth.

In August 2026, Musliyar's scholarly organisation known as Samastha Kerala Jem-iyyathul Ulama issued a directive to local madrasas asking them "not to exhibit women in front of other men on the streets or stages" during Eid Milad-un-Nabi celebrations. At the subsequent Hubbu Rasool Conference in Kochi, Musliyar warned that allowing women onto public platforms would lead to "great destruction" and stated that the Quran called for women to remain confined within their homes. Musliyar's remarks were criticized by multiple politicians and some religious leaders. V. D. Satheesan, the Chief Minister of Kerala, stated that Musliyar had 'misinterpreted' the teachings of Islam, and joined leaders from the Communist Party of India (Marxist) and Indian National Congress in criticizing the remarks.

Regarding Musliyar's statement, the stand of Jifri Muthu Koya Thangal, the president of EK Samastha, as expressed—at a function jointly attended by Musliyar, Jifri Muthu Koya Thangal, and Sayyid Ibrahim Khaleel Al Bukhari—is that the Quranic teaching is that women should not go outside like they did in the age of ignorance. He clarified Musliyar did not say women should not go outside the house. He also says Islam clearly states laws that have to be followed by women while remaining in the house and when leaving it.

Musliyar maintains, as was articulated at the same function, that neither he, Jifri Muthu Koya Thangal, nor Sayyid Ibraheem Khaleel Al Bukhari says women should be kept locked up. Moreover, he asks whether anyone would believe it if it were claimed that he said women should remain indoors. He also states that thousands of female students study in the institutions run by him.

=== Fatwa against ISIS ===
Musliyar was the first to issue a fatwa against ISIS. Musliyar issued his Fatwa on ISIS on 27 August 2014. This is the first fatwa—a nonbinding legal opinion in Islamic law—issued against ISIS according to Ashwani Kumar writing in Khaleej Times. The document, a copy of which is held in the United Arab Emirates National Archives, was a commission to all Indian Sunni Jamiyyathul Ulama to raise awareness against terrorism. At the time of the fatwa, Abubakr did not hold the title of Grand Mufti since his election to the office came on 24 February 2019. He has also issued fatwas a second time against ISIS and against other terrorist groups.

=== On CAB and CAA ===
Musliyar opposed the Citizenship Amendment Bill and Citizenship Amendment Act, and he organised and attended in many protests against the act. Though he did not supported the hartal organised by SDPI and said the hartal is needless. He visited the family members of protesters killed in police firing at Mangalore to express his condolences. He was widely criticized for his stand on protesting women against the CAA. He stated that "women shouldn’t hit streets against the CAA, and shouldn't raise slogans or clench fists."

=== On Babri Masjid Verdict ===
Musliyar appealed to the Islamic Community of India to welcome the Supreme Court verdict in the Babri Masjid dispute case before the verdict and accepted after. He said "We respect the Supreme Court. Everyone must strive for peace in India. The victory or defeat over the Babri Masjid incident may be significant to every party, but the protection of India and its sovereignty is much more important." He said, "Babri Masjid is a place of worship for Muslims, but equally important is that all people live peacefully in India."

=== Citizenship Amendment Act ===
He met both the Prime Minister of India, Narendra Modi, and Minister of Home Affairs, Amit Shah, at their offices on 20 March 2020 and urged them to amend the Citizenship Amendment Act and National Register of Citizens to remove religion from the list of eligibility criteria for citizenship.

== Organisations ==
In the late 1980 Musliyar was a leader of the Samastha Kerala Jamiat-ul-Ulema together with E. K. Aboobacker Musliyar but due to personality differences chose to split off a group which came to be known as the AP Faction; the residual group becoming referred to as the EK Faction.

Both factions, which are pre-dominately based in Kerala, have set up a set of broadly parallel organisations at both All India and state level, with Musliyar dominant in those of the AP Faction.

In January 2018 committees were formed to re-unite the factions with the objective of re-uniting the groups to achieve an improved political influence. As of June 2020 there has been no merger.

At the time of his assumption of the title of Grand Mufti of India in February 2019 he was variously described as general secretary of the All-India Muslim Scholars Association for over 25 years, and as general secretary of the All India Sunni Jamiyyathul Ulama.

== Honours, awards and international recognition ==
- International Tokoh Maal Hijrah Award Malaysia honoured him with International Tokoh Maal Hijrah Award on the basis of his invaluable contribution to promoting the message of love in Islam on 20 July 2023 by the Malaysian King Al Sultan Abdulla Sultan Ahmad Shahat held at the Kuala Lumpur World Trade Centre.
- Islamic Heritage Award for his service in the protection of Islamic culture and heritage from the Institute of Islamic Heritage, based in the Saudi Arabia. The award was given by the then Minister of Parliamentary Affairs, Vayalar Ravi in January 2008.
- Jewels of World Muslim Biz Award by OIC Today in 2016 from then Malaysian Finance Minister, Johari Abdul Ghani.
- Ras Al Khaimah Islamic Academy Award for the best Social Worker in 1992.
- Indian Islamic Centre Award for outstanding services in the field of Education and Social Services.
- Hamil Al Gaith International Holy Quran Award in 2005.
- Best Indo-Arab Personality Award in 2006.
- He has consecutively been ranked for many years as an influential Muslim from India by The 500 Most Influential Muslims published by the Royal Islamic Strategic Studies Centre of Jordan.

== Literary Works ==
- Muhammad: The Messenger
- Religion, Polity and Nationalism
- The Mind of Islam

== See also ==
- Muhammad Alawi al-Maliki
- Akhtar Raza Khan
- Sayyid Abdurrahman Al Bukhari
- Habib Ali al-Jifri
- Nuh Ha Mim Keller
- Abd al-Rahman al-Shaghouri
- Shaykh Abdal Hakim Murad
- Muhammad Metwali Al-Sha'raawi
- Muslim Jamaat

== Notes ==
Religious titles
Preceded by Akhtar Raza Khan	Grand Mufti of India; 2019–present	Succeeded by Incumbent
Academic offices
Preceded by E. K. Aboobacker Musliyar	Chancellor of the Markazu Ssaqafathi Ssunniyya; 1996–present	Succeeded by Incumbent
