= Siraj Daily =

Daily newspaper in Malayalam

- Type: Daily newspaper
- Format: Broadsheet and online
- Owner: Thoufeeque Publication
- Publisher: C. Muhammed Faizy
- Editor-in-chief: V.P.M. Faizy Villiappally
- Launched: 29 April 1984; 42 years ago
- Language: Malayalam
- City: Kozhikode, Thiruvananthapuram, Kochi, Kannur, Malappuram, Bengaluru, Dubai, Oman, Qatar
- Sister newspapers: Gulf Siraj, Prathivaram
- RNI: 36192/1984, KERMAL/2013/53722, KERMAL/2013/53724 and KERMAL/2013/53726
- Website: Online
- Free online archives: E-Paper

Siraj (Malayalam: സിറാജ് ദിനപത്രം, Arabic: جريدة السراج اليومية) is a daily newspaper in Malayalam language. It was established in 1984. It is published by Thoufeeque Publications in the following cities in India: Kozhikode, Thiruvananthapuram, Kochi, Kannur, and Malappuram in the state of Kerala and Bengaluru in Karnataka state. In the Persian Gulf Arab states, it is published in Dubai, Oman and Qatar. The head office of the newspaper is located at Kozhikode. The editor-in-chief is V.P.M. Faizy Villiappaly. The newspaper has nine editions.

== See also ==
- List of Malayalam-language newspapers
- List of Malayalam-language periodicals
- List of newspapers in India
