= Muslim Jamaat =

Islamic organisation based in Kerala, India

Kerala Muslim Jamaath is a Kerala-based Islamic organization in India, under the supervision of the All India Sunni Jamiyyathul Ulama. This body acts as an apex body of various other organization and institutions following the ideologies of Samastha Kerala Jamiyyathul Ulama.

== Party's ideology and mission ==
"This is not a political party. We will not take any direct political role. Other than politics, we have lots of things to do for society. All should contribute for nation building," Muslim Jamaat leader Sheikh Abubakr Ahmad said when he announced the launch of the Kerala Muslim Jamaath in Malappuram Municipal Town Hall on 10 October 2015. Grand Mufti of India and a social activist, Sheikh Abubakr Ahmad has been elected as the President of the Kerala Muslim Jamaat. He also often says that education is the most powerful weapon in the fight against terrorism and was the first religious Muslim leader in India to issue a fatwa (religious decree) against the terror group Daesh.

The organization rejects the Islamic extremism Jamat was in the broadcast regarding its strong opposes to the Indian Prime Minister Narendra Modi with citizen amendment act.

In an act of communal amity, the Cheravally Muslim Jamaath Committee, Kayamkulam, on January 19 hosted a Hindu marriage on the mosque premises.

The origin of the term Jamaat is from the Arabic language: جماعتِ (meaning assembly).

== Programmes ==
- On January 19, 2022, the Kerala Muslim Jamath organized a conference in the city of Malappuram, Kerala to explain and promote the Sunni Islamic ideology against Salafism. During the conference, the organizers criticized the Salafi ideology and highlighted the problems they believe it poses. The conference drew a large crowd of attendees and received significant media coverage in the region.
- The Organization has publicly opposed the state government's revenue recovery procedures. The organization claims that the government's actions, which were ordered by the Kerala High Court, have targeted non-members of the Popular Front of India (PFI) and are a mistake. The Jamath argues that the government's actions are unjust and have caused financial hardships for innocent individuals. The organization has called for the government to review its policy and for the release of those who have been falsely accused.
