= Ramlila Maidan =

Ground in New Delhi

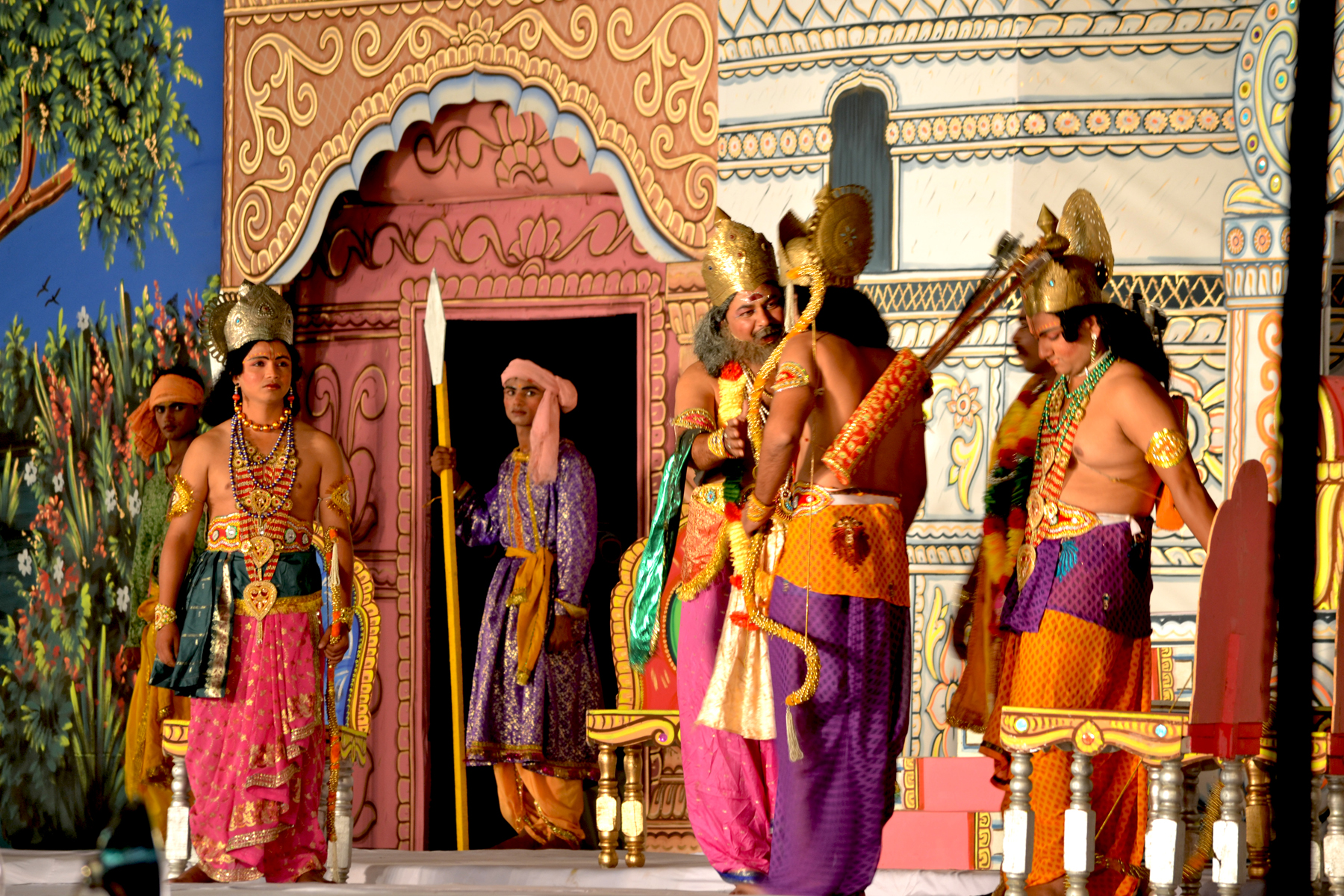
- A scene from annual Ramlila at Ramlila Maidan, New Delhi, 2012
- Interactive map of Ramlila Maidan
- Full name: Ramlila Maidan New Delhi
- Address: Near New Delhi Railway Station and Delhi Gate; New Delhi, Delhi; India
- Location: Between New Delhi Railway Station & Delhi Gate
- Coordinates: 28.641892°N 77.230698°E
- Elevation: 209 m (686 ft)
- Capacity: Approximately 25000 to 30000
- Type: Multipurpose Ground
- Surface: Soil; Grass
- Field shape: Square
- Acreage: 10 acres (0.040 km^{2})
- Current use: Annual Ramlila Programme; It is used for religious festivals, major political rallies and meetings, and entertainment events
- Public transit: Yellow Chawri Bazaar Metro Station; Indian Railway New Delhi Railway Station
- Parking: Yes; May be or not

Construction
- Built: 1883 (143 years ago)
- Rebuilt: 1930 (96 years ago)
- Years active: 1930–present

Ramlila Maidan is a large ground located in New Delhi, India, traditionally used for staging the annual Ramlila. It is used for religious festivals, major political rallies and meetings, and entertainment events. It is located near New Delhi Railway Station and Delhi Gate.

== History ==
The Ramlila Maidan was originally a large pond before 1930. It was filled up in the early 1930s so that annual Ramlila, held in October, could be shifted here from the reti (sandy) floodplains of Yamuna River behind the Red Fort, where Hindu soldiers of the Mughal army first started staging the Ramila in the 1800s. Geographically the ground falls between the Old Delhi and the New Delhi. The historic Turkman Gate of the Old city stands nearby, and the ground stretches between Aruna Asaf Ali Marg and Jawaharlal Nehru Road. It quickly became a popular site for political meetings, with Mahatma Gandhi, Jawaharlal Nehru, Sardar Patel and other top nationalist leaders addressing rallies here. A small pond is still there inside the Ramlila ground as a remembrance of its history.

Ramlila hosted here has been frequently visited by the members of the prominent Nehru-Gandhi Family including Sonia Gandhi and Rahul Gandhi.

== Historical events ==
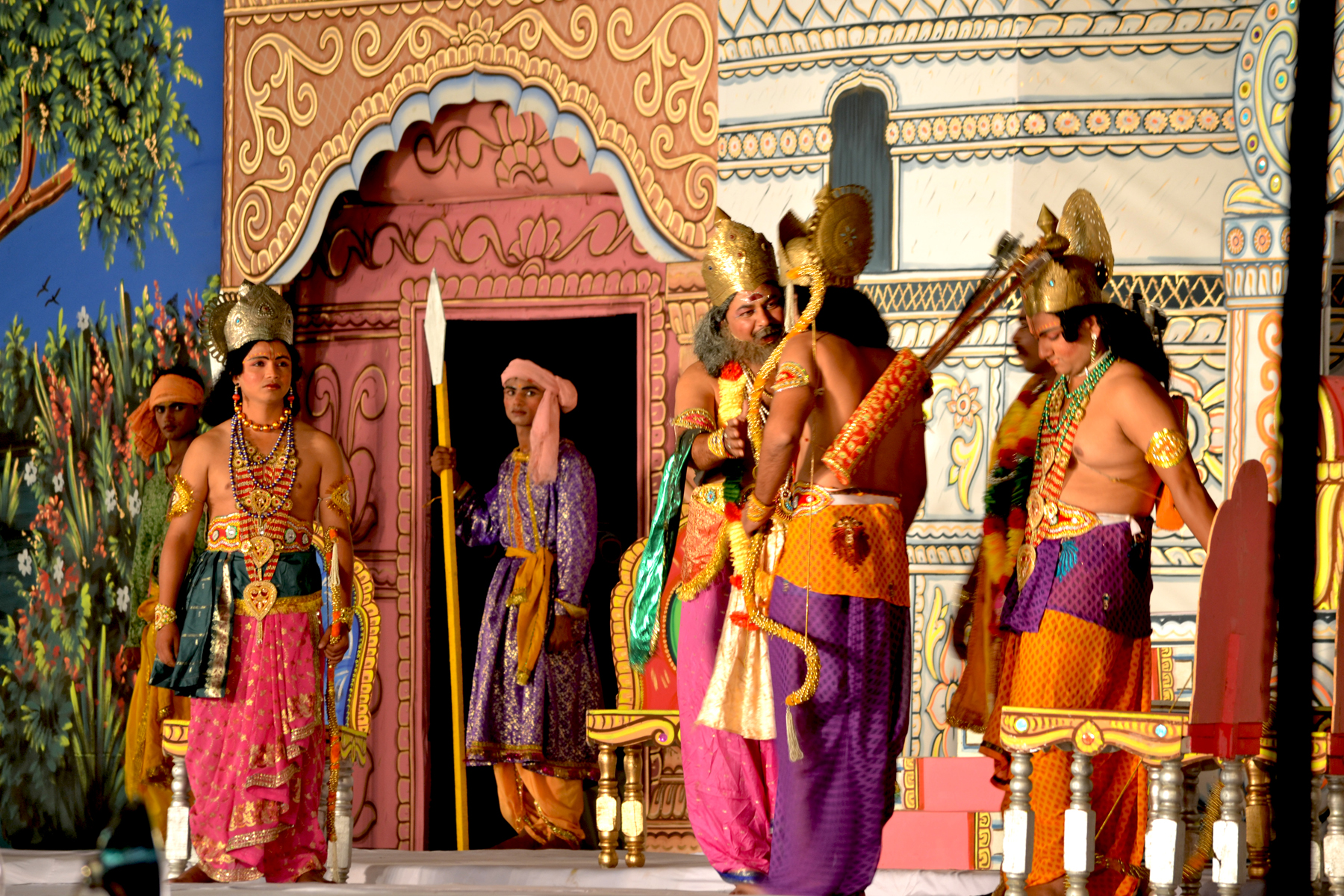
A scene from annual Ramlila at Ramlila Maidan, New Delhi, 2012

In 1961, then prime minister Jawaharlal Nehru held a public gathering welcoming Queen Elizabeth II during her state visit to India. On Republic Day, 1963 after India's defeat in Indo-China war, Lata Mangeshkar sang the patriotic song, "Aye Mere Watan Ke Logo" in the presence of Jawaharlal Nehru. Two years later in 1965, at public gathering here, then prime minister Lal Bahadur Shastri gave his slogan Jai Jawan Jai Kisan.

Jayaprakash Narayan along with prominent Opposition leaders, addressed a mammoth rally with over a lakh people participating on 25 June 1975. This was the first protest in Ramlila Maidan, which was against Indira Gandhi's government. This was Jayaprakash Narayan last rally before he was arrested.

Just after Emergency situation was removed in India, in February 1977, several anti-Congress(opposition) leaders came on a common platform to form Janata Party. The Joint rally was held at Ramlila and was led by several opposition leaders Jagjivan Ram, Morarji Desai, Atal Bihari Vajpayee, Charan Singh and Chandra Shekhar. Since Vajpayee had by then already acquired the reputation of a master orator, large crowds turned up to listen to him, as also the other speakers. The rally also a large number of Muslims had turned up to hear the Shahi Imam, Bukhari Senior, who had extended their backing to the Janata Party.

The 2011 anti corruption demonstration of Anna Hazare and the 2013 as well as the 2015 oath ceremony of the Delhi chief minister Arvind Kejriwal also took place at the Ramlila Maidan.

== Recent events ==
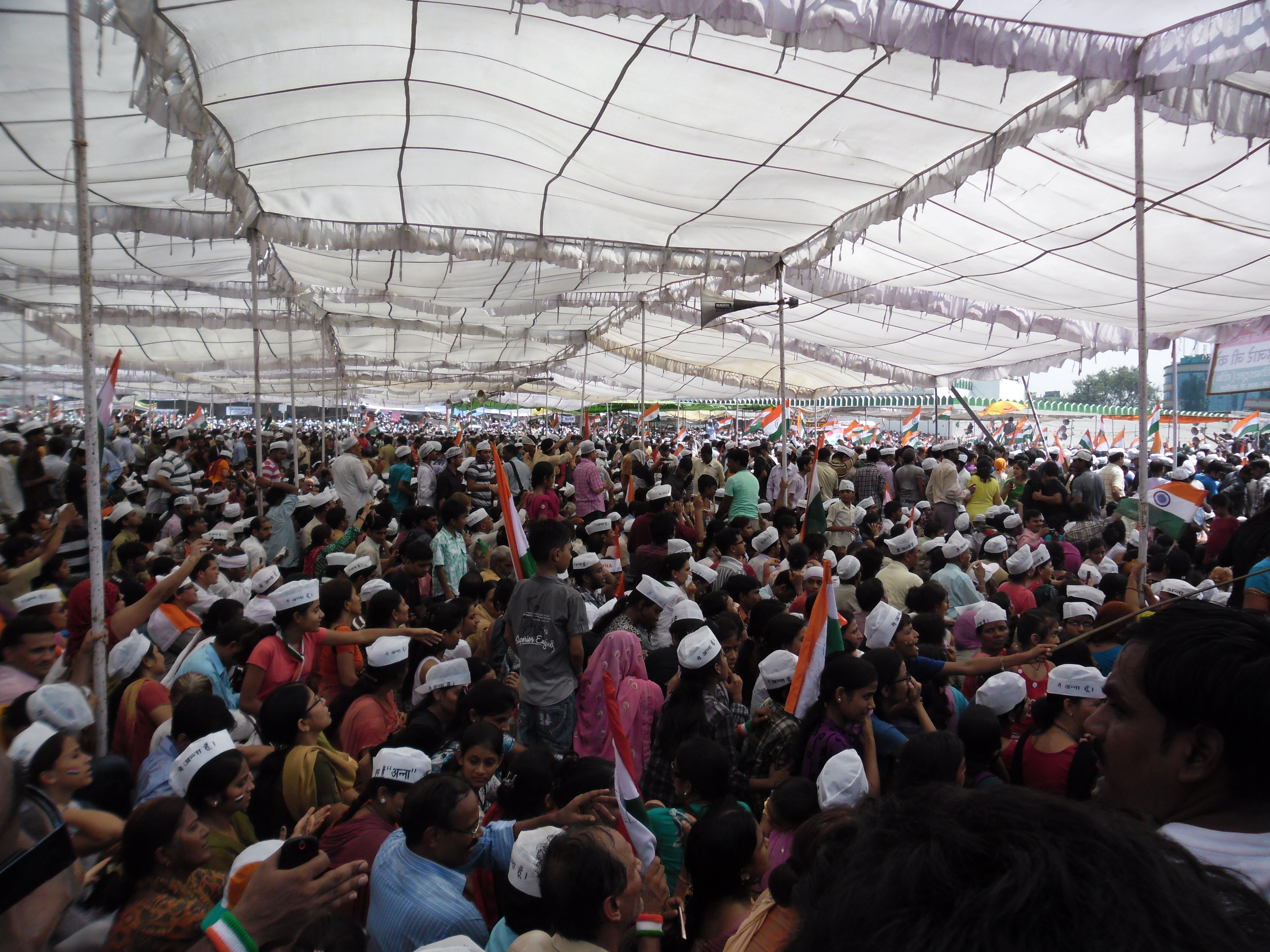
People Gathered at Ramlila maidan on Anna Hazare's Fast.

Ramlila Maidan was also venue for Swami Ramdev for his indefinite hunger strike on 4 June 2011 to bring back the black money stashed in tax havens abroad, which saw 65,000 odd supporters. However, the event came to highlight when Delhi Police on 6 June along with a large police force lobbed tear gas shells, burned the place and lathi charged the crowd at 1 am (IST) to evict them.

2011 again saw anti-corruption protests in the month of August; this time from the activist Anna Hazare.

The month of November of the same year saw another gathering, this time mainly from the minorities under the banner Popular Front of India social justice conference. The conference was organized by now banned, Islamist organization Popular Front of India(PFI).

In April 2021, ICU facilities were created in the place and vacant Ramlila ground in East Delhi, as the city was running out of ICU(Intensive Care Unit) beds and lot of fresh COVID-19 cases being reported continuously.

== See also ==
- Ramlila Maidan protests – Protests in June 2011 at Ramlila maidan.
- 2011 Indian anti-corruption movement – Protests in August 2011 at Ramlila maidan.
