= Poonoor =

Settlement in Kerala, India

- Town
- Location in Kerala, India Poonoor (India)
- Coordinates: 11.43661°N 75.901401°E
- Country: India
- State: Kerala
- District: Kozhikode
- Taluk Subdistrict: Thamarassery
- Village Council: Unnikulam
- Founder: People

Government
  - Member of Parliament: M. K. Raghavan (UDF)
  - M.L.A: K. M. Sachin Dev (LDF)

Languages
  - Official: Malayalam,
- Time zone: UTC+5:30 (IST)
- PIN: 673574
- Telephone code: 0496
- Vehicle registration: KL-56, KL-57, KL-76
- Nearest city: Kozhikode
- Lok Sabha constituency: Kozhikode

Poonoor ( പൂനൂർ ) is a town in Kozhikode District, Kerala, India. The town is part of the Unnikulam Panchayath, within the Thamarassery Taluk of the Kozhikode District. Poonoor can be found on the banks of the Poonoor River 4.5 km west of Thamarassery and 8.5 km east of Balussery. The town is situated on the Koyilandy-Edavanna Road State Highway 34 (SH 34) that starts in Koyilandy and ends in Edavanna.
