= Markazu Saqafathi Sunniyya =

Indian nonprofit organization

Markazu Saquafathi Sunniyya
- Logo
- Other name: Markaz
- Motto: Shaping a Culture
- Type: Nonprofit organization
- Established: 1978; 48 years ago
- Founder: Sheikh Abubakr Ahmad
- Director: CP Ubaidullah Saquafi
- Location: Karanthur, Kozhikode, Kerala, 673571, India
- Colors: Blue and White
- Website: markaz.in

Markazu Saquafathi Sunniyya, also known as Markaz is a nonprofit organization in India, which administers educational and charitable institutions throughout the country. Its head office is located in Kozhikode city in Kerala. It was established in 1978.

Markaz also has a branch in Dubai under the supervision of Islamic Affairs and Charitable Activities Department of Dubai (Markaz, Dubai also called Dubai Markaz) with various courses in Islamic studies.

== Institutions ==
Islamic Colleges

1. Jamia Markaz Islamic University, Kozhikode
2. World Institute For Research in Advanced Sciences (WIRAS), Kozhikode
3. Jamia Madeenathunnoor, Kozhikode
4. Markaz Garden, Kozhikode
5. Markaz Academy of Quran Studies, Kozhikode
6. Khalfan Qur'an Research Centre, Kozhikode

Professional & Technical Colleges

1. Markaz Law College, Kozhikode.
2. Markaz Unani Medical College, Kozhikode
3. Markaz College of Arts & Science, Kozhikde.
4. Markaz ITI & Technical Institute, Kozhiokde.

Aided Schools

1. Markaz Boys Higher Secondary School, Karanthur.
2. Markaz Girs Higher Secondary School, Karanthur.
3. Fathimabi Memorial Higher Secondary School, Koombara.
4. Al Farookhia Higher Secondary School, Cheranalloor

Private schools

1. Markaz international school, ernhipalam
2. markaz public school, kaithapoyil
3. markaz english medium school, karanthur
4. Ishaath Public School, Poonoor

Orphanages

1. Markaz Rayhan Valley for Boys, Kozhikode.
2. Markaz Green Valley for Girs, Kozhikode.

== Welfare services ==
Markaz provides financial aid to poor students for further studies. There is a special fund for assisting the students who aspire to study here and abroad, top scorers attend universities in Egypt, UAE etc. Markaz sponsors medical and engineering students studying in Kerala and other states like Karnataka, Uttar Pradesh, and Delhi. There is a special welfare outlet functioning in the capital city, Delhi.

== International relations and Affiliation ==
- Al-Azhar University, Cairo, Egypt.
- Al Qasimia University, Sharjah, UAE.
- International Islamic University of Malaysia (IIUM), Malaysia.
- The World Islamic Science & Education (WISE) University, Jordan.
- University of Ez-zitouna, Tunisia.
- International Medical University, Kyrgyzstan.
- Institut Agama Negeri, Indonesia.
- Jamiyah, Singapore.
- Üsküdar University Central Campus, Turkey.
- University Kebangsaan, Malaysia.
- Jamia Al Ahqaf, Yemen.
- Kulliya dawa islamia, Libya.
- The Arab Society For Islamic Civilization and Arts, Egypt.
- African University, Senegal.
- Arak Development, Kingdom of Saudi Arabia.
- Universiti Sains Islam, Malaysia.
- University Islam Pahang Sultan Ahmad Shah, Malaysia.
- Avid College, Maldives.
- Syarif Hidayatullah State Islamic University, Indonesia.

== National relations and Affiliation ==
- Jamia Millia Islamic University, New Delhi.
- Aligarh Muslim University, Aligarh, Utter Pradesh.
- Jamia Hamdard University, New Delhi.
- Maulana Azad National Urdu University, Hyderabad.
- Islamic University of Science & Technology, Jammu & Kashmir.

== Ruby Jubilee ==
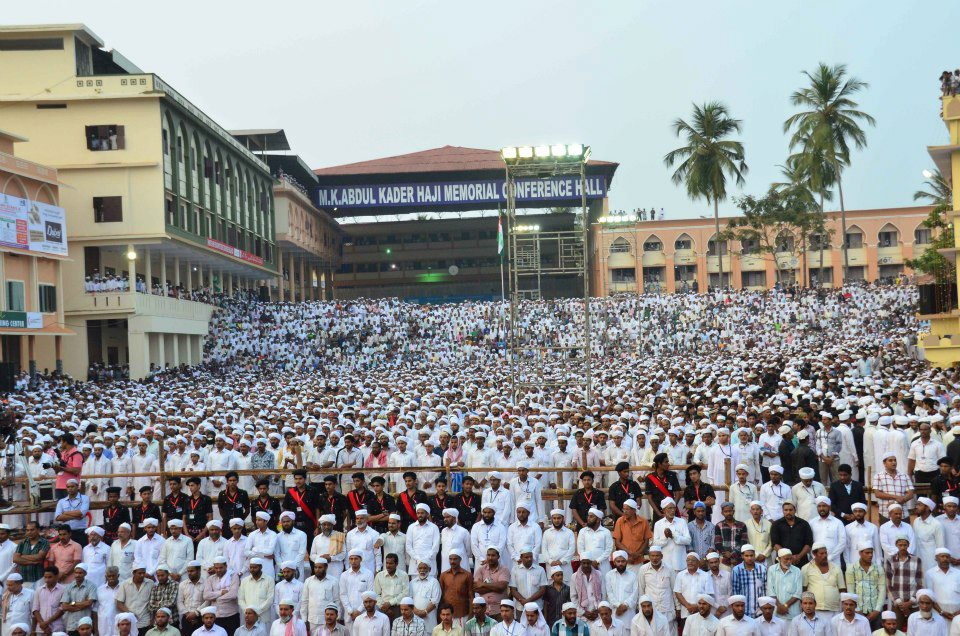
Convocation ceremony in Sunni Markaz, Kerala India in 2013

Markaz Ruby Jubilee is the fortieth annual conference of Markazu Saquafathi Sunniyya. As part of the ruby jubilee celebrations, Markaz conducted a number of seminars and conferences. That discussed a large number of issues pertain to the crisis of humanity and Muslim world. It was held during 4 January 2018 and 7th of the same month.

- Cultural conference
- Inaugural Conference
- Sheikh Zayed International Peace Conference
- National Integration Conference
- Inauguration of Queens’ Land
- International Islamic Scholars’ Conference

== See also ==
- List of Islamic educational institutions
- Sheikh Abubakr Ahmad
- Karwan-I-Islami
- Al-Azhar University
- Sunni
- Imam Ahmed Raza Khan
- Grand Mufti of India
- Dawat-e-Islami
- Hanafi
- Shafa'i
