= South Malabar =

- Geographical / Historical Area
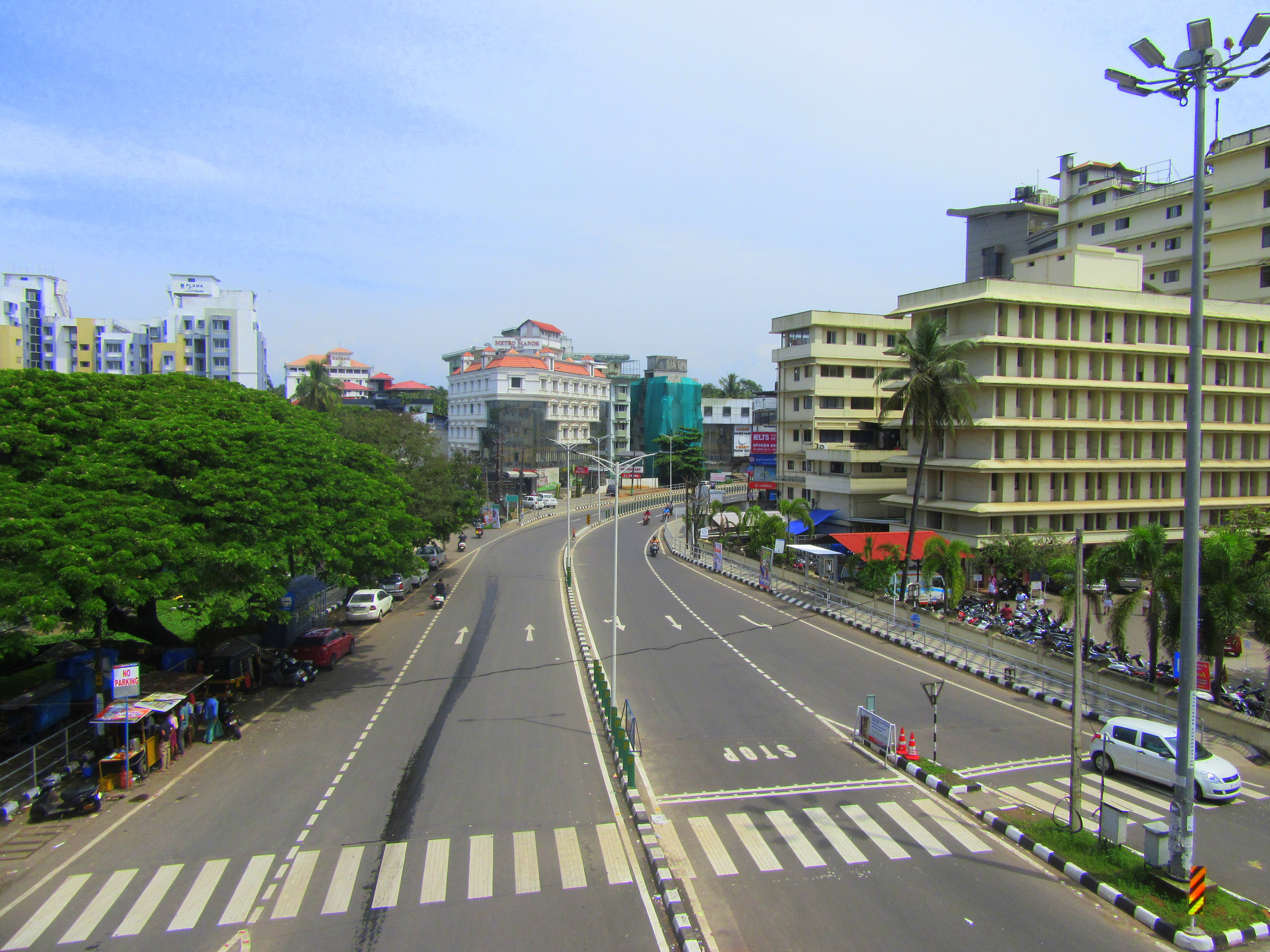
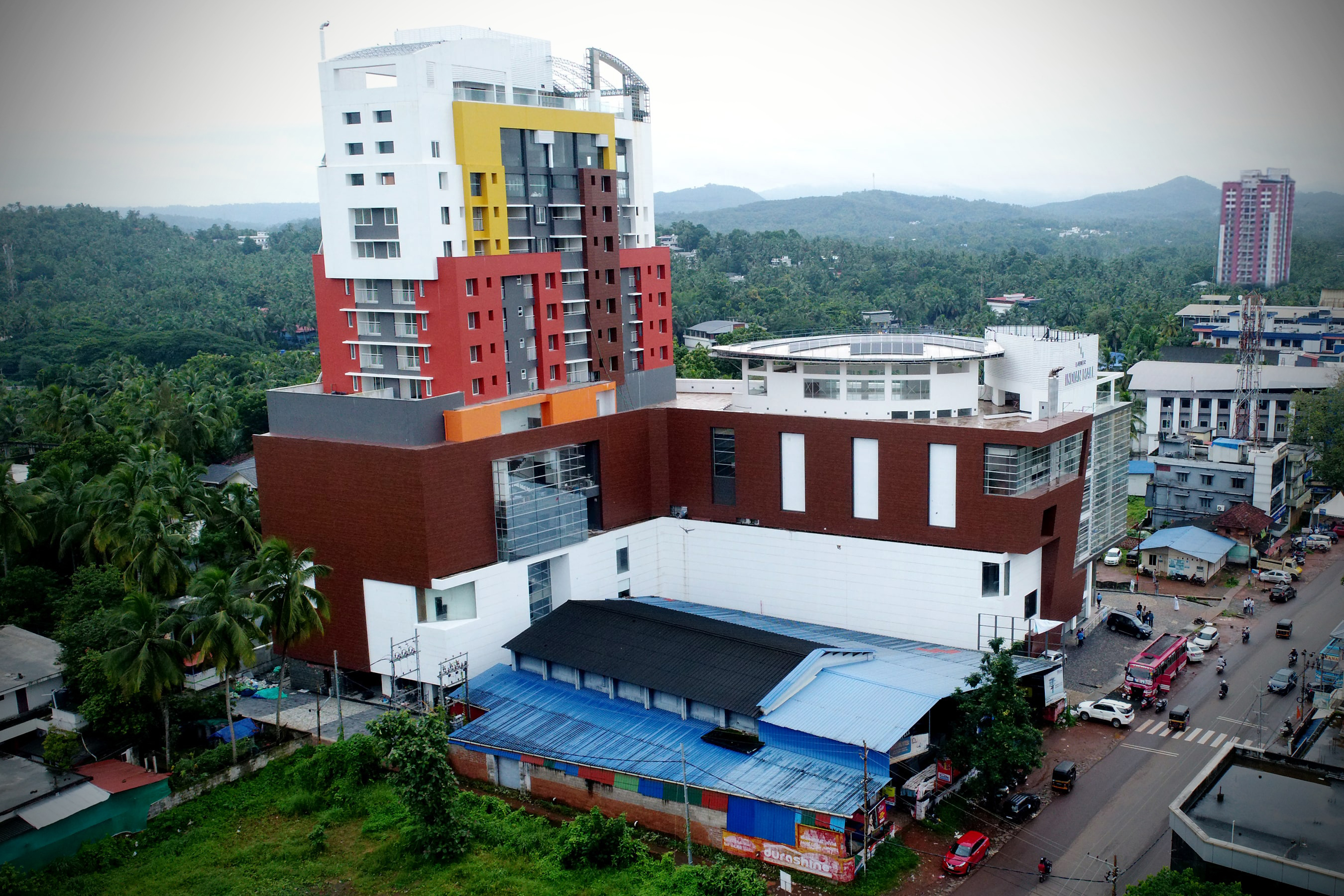
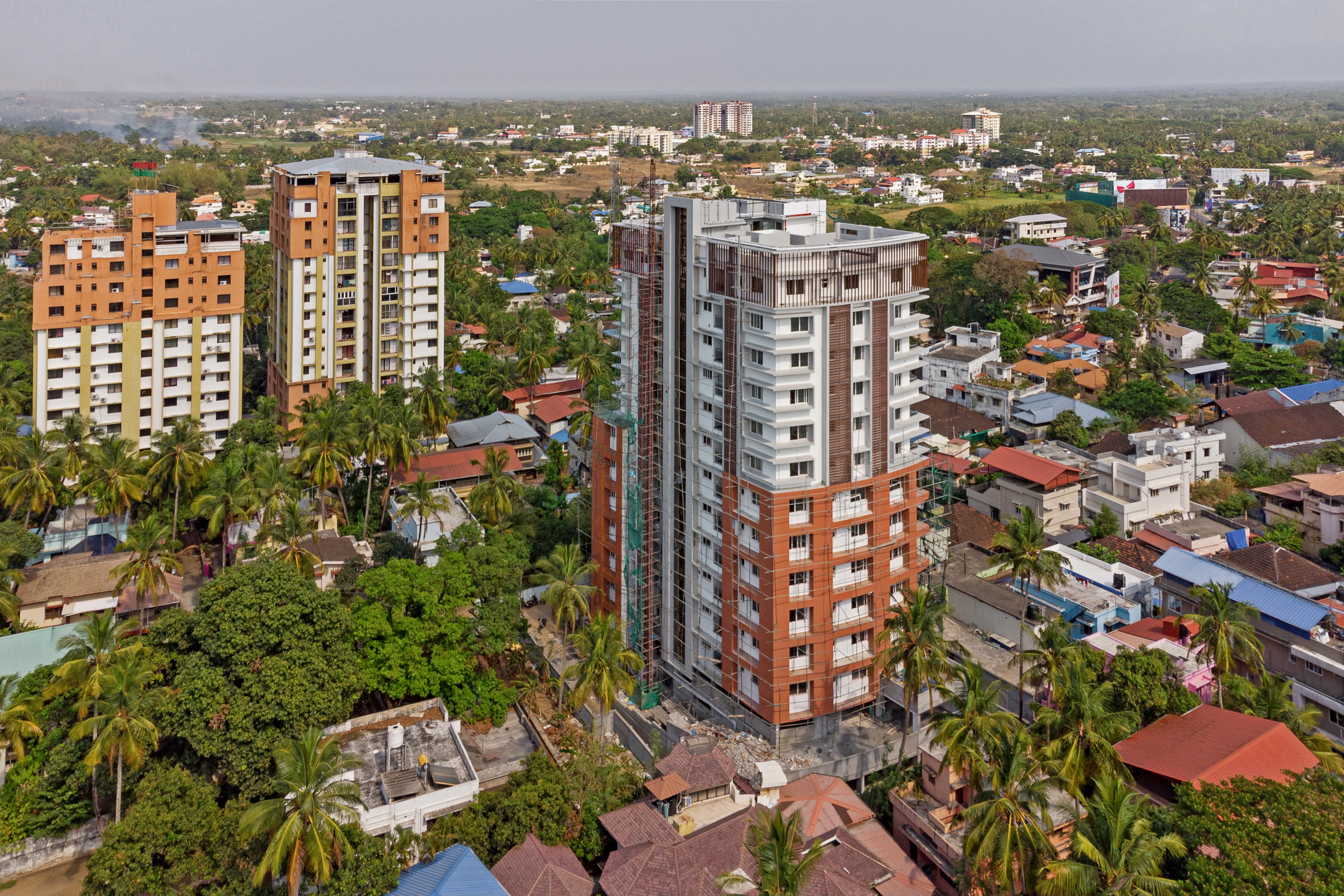
- Top to bottom: Kozhikode metropolitan area, Malappuram metropolitan area, and Palakkad city view from Kunnathurmedu.
- Country: India
- State: Kerala

Government
  - Body: Government of Kerala

Area
  - Total: 7,416 km^{2} (2,863 sq mi)

Population (2011)(approx.)
  - Total: 8,368,794
  - Density: 1,128/km^{2} (2,920/sq mi)

Languages
  - Official: Malayalam
- Time zone: UTC+5:30 (IST)
- PIN: 673***, 676***, 678***, 679*** and 680***
- ISO 3166 code: IN-KL
- Vehicle registration: KL-08, KL-09, KL-10, KL-11, KL-46, KL-49, KL-50, KL-51, KL-52, KL-53, KL-54, KL-55, KL-57, KL-65, KL-71, KL-75, KL-76, KL-77, KL-84 & KL-85
- Niyamasabha constituencies: 36

South Malabar refers to a geographical area of the southwestern coast of India covering some parts of the present-day Kerala state. South Malabar covers the regions included in present-day Kozhikode and Thamarassery taluk of Kozhikode district, Wayanad district excluding Mananthavady taluk, the whole area of Malappuram district, Chavakkad (including Guruvayur) taluk of Thrissur district, and Palakkad district, excluding parts of Chittur taluk. The Fort Kochi region of Kochi city also historically belongs to South Malabar. The term South Malabar refers to the region of the erstwhile Malabar District south to the river Korapuzha, and north to the Thrissur Chavakkad region

Unlike most of Thrissur district, which was historically part of Cochin state; Guruvayur formed part of the erstwhile Malabar district.

Under British rule, South Malabar's chief importance lay in producing coconut, pepper, and tiles. Old administrative records of the erstwhile Madras Presidency recorded that the most remarkable plantation owned by the government in the Madras Presidency was the teak plantation at Nilambur, planted in 1844. South Malabar held importance as one of the two districts in the Madras Presidency that lay on the western Malabar Coast, thus accessing the marine route through the Arabian Sea via its ports at Beypore and Fort Kochi. The first railway line of Kerala, from Tirur to Beypore, was laid for it.

Kozhikode is the capital and largest city of the whole of Malabar, followed by Palakkad. The South Malabar region is bounded by North Malabar (Korapuzha) to north, the hilly region of Nilgiris and Palakkad Gap which connects Coimbatore to east, Cochin to south, and Arabian Sea to west. The historical regions of Nediyiruppu Swaroopam, Eranad, Valluvanad, Parappanad, Kavalappara, Vettathunadu, the Nilambur Kingdom, Nedungadis, and Palakkad, are all included in South Malabar. The longest three rivers of Malabar region, namely the Bharathappuzha, Chaliyar, and Kadalundi Rivers, flow through South Malabar.

== Etymology ==
Until the arrival of British, the term Malabar was used in foreign trade circles as a general name for Kerala. Earlier, the term Malabar had been used to also include Tulu Nadu and Kanyakumari, which lie contiguous to Kerala on the southwestern coast of India. The people of Malabar were known as Malabars. The term Malabar is still often used to denote the entire southwestern coast of India.

In the 6th century, Arab sailors called Kerala as Male. The first element of the name, however, was already attested in Cosmas Indicopleustes' Topography, which mentions a pepper emporium called "Male", which clearly gave its name to Malabar (lit. 'the country of Male'). The name Malabar is thought to come from the Dravidian word mala (lit. 'hill') and the Persian word barr (lit. 'country/continent').

Historically, Arab writers variously called this place Malibar, Manibar, Mulibar, and Munibar. Al-Biruni (973–1048) must have been the first writer to call this state Malabar. Authors such as Ibn Khordadbeh and Al-Baladhuri mention Malabar ports in their works.

== History ==
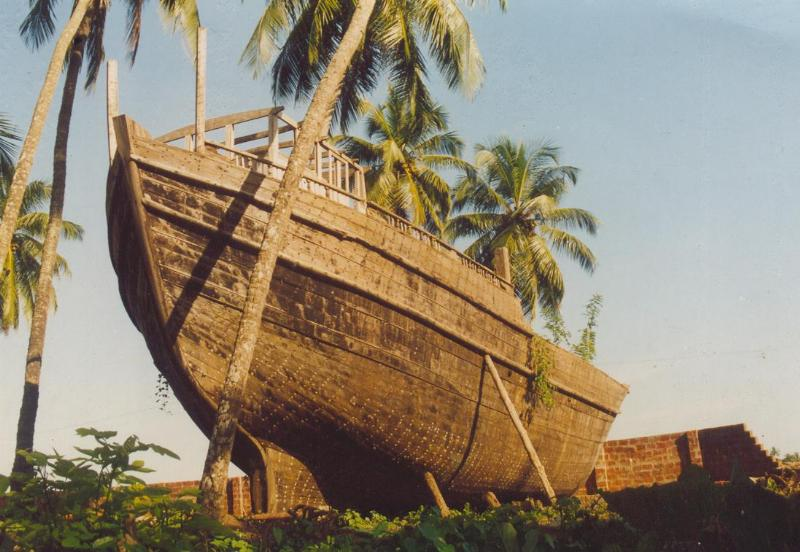
Uru, a type of ship built at Beypore, Calicut

=== Ancient era ===
The ancient port of Tyndis, which was located on the northern side of Muziris, as mentioned in the Periplus of the Erythraean Sea, was somewhere near Kozhikode. Its exact location is a matter of dispute. The suggested locations are Ponnani, Tanur, Beypore–Chaliyam–Kadalundi–Vallikkunnu, and Koyilandy. Tyndis was a major center of trade, next only to Muziris, with the Chera dynasty and the Roman Empire. The region around Coimbatore was ruled by the Cheras during Sangam period between 1st and the 4th centuries CE and served as the eastern entrance to the Palakkad Gap, the principal inland trade route between the Malabar Coast and Coromandel Coast.

Pliny the Elder (1st century CE) stated that the port of Tyndis was located at the northwestern border of Keprobotos (Chera dynasty). The North Malabar region, which lies north of the port at Tyndis, was ruled by the kingdom of Ezhimala during the Sangam period. According to the Periplus of the Erythraean Sea, a region known as Limyrike began at Naura and Tyndis. However, Ptolemy mentions only Tyndis as the Limyrike's starting point. The region probably ended at Kanyakumari; it thus roughly corresponds to the present-day Malabar Coast. The value of Rome's annual trade with the region was estimated at 50,000,000 sesterces. Pliny the Elder mentioned that Limyrike was prone by pirates. Cosmas Indicopleustes mentioned that the Limyrike was a source of peppers.

=== Early Middle Ages ===
During the early Middle Ages, South Malabar was home to numerous political realms, including the kingdoms of Cochin, Parappanad, Vettathunadu (Tanur), Valluvanad, Nilambur, Nedungadi, and Palakkad.

The Kurumathur inscription found near Areekode dates back to 871 CE. Three inscriptions written in Old Malayalam dating from 932 CE were found in Triprangode (near Tirunavaya), Kottakkal, and Chaliyar, and mention the name of Goda Ravi of the Chera dynasty. Of these, the Triprangode inscription describes the agreement of Thavanur.

Several inscriptions written in Old Malayalam dating from the 10th century have found in Sukapuram near Edappal, which was one of the 64 old Nambudiri villages of Kerala. Descriptions about the rulers of the Eranad and Valluvanad regions can be seen in the Jewish copper plates of Bhaskara Ravi Varman (around 1000 CE) and Viraraghava copper plates of Veera Raghava Chakravarthy (around 1225 CE). At the Muchundi Mosque in Kozhikode, a 13th-century granite inscription written in a mixture of Old Malayalam and Arabic mentions a donation by the king to the mosque.

Eranad was ruled by a Samanthan Nair clan known as Eradis, similar to the Vellodis of neighbouring Valluvanad and Nedungadis of Nedunganad (Ottapalam). The rulers of Valluvanad were known by the title Eralppad or Eradi. The ruler of Eranad later became the Zamorin of Calicut by annexing the port town of Calicut from Polanad, a vassal to Kolathunadu.

=== Rise of Kozhikode ===
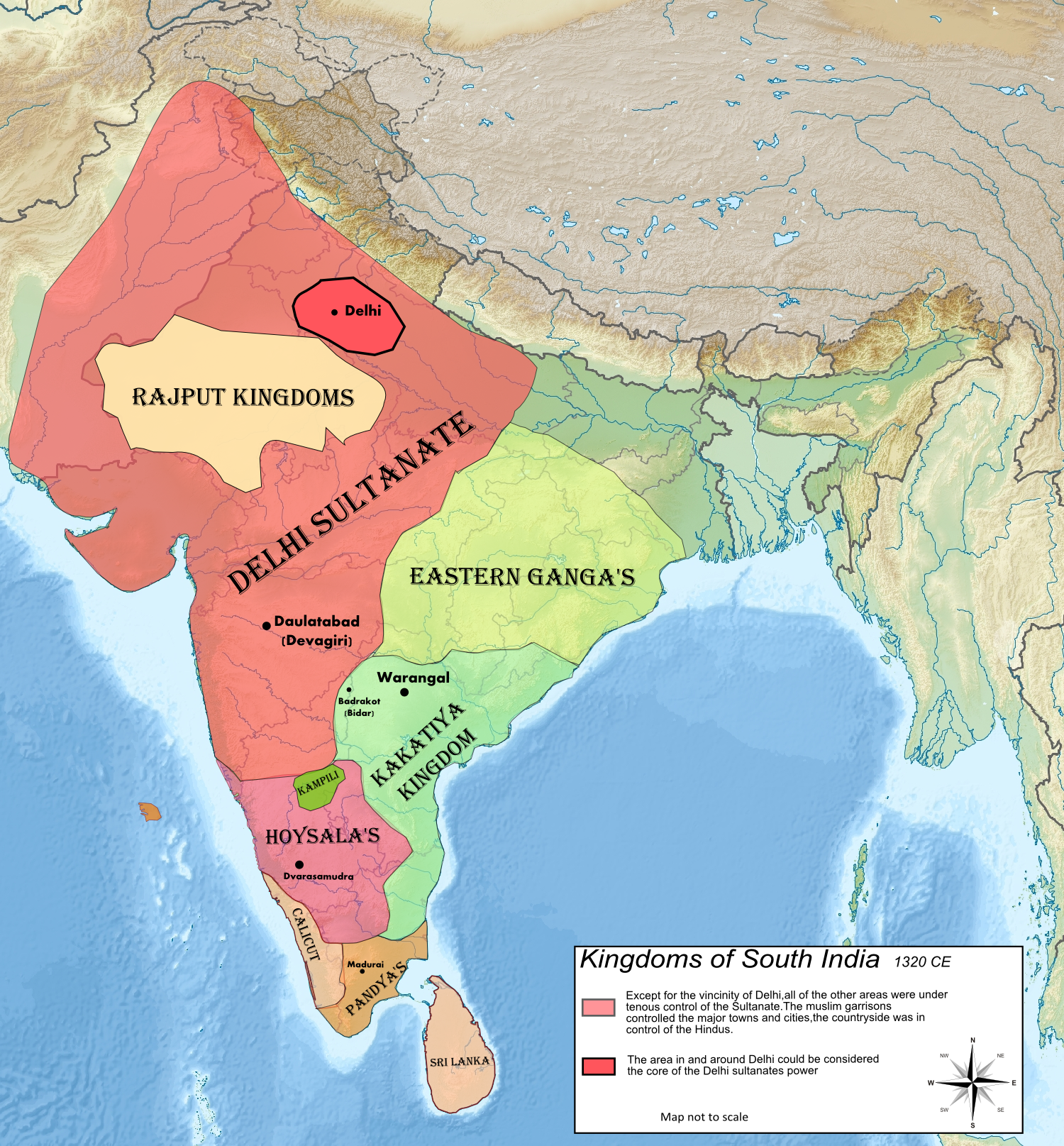
India in early 1320. Most of present-day state of Kerala was under the influence of the Zamorin of Kozhikode.

The Zamorin of Kozhikode (Calicut) was the most powerful ruler of South Malabar during the Middle Ages. Under its rule, Kozhikode was the largest city on Malabar Coast, and South Malabar emerged as one of the leading centres of maritime trade on the Indian subcontinent. This continued until the 18th century. The port at Kozhikode was the gateway to the South Indian coast for Arabs, who had a monopoly on foreign trade, and later the Portuguese, Dutch, and British.

The Zamorin, who originally ruled Eranad from Nediyiruppu, developed the port at Kozhikode and relocated there for its maritime trade. In the 14th century, Kozhikode conquered larger parts of central Kerala after seizing the Tirunavaya region from the Kingdom of Valluvanad, which was under control of the Kingdom of Cochin. The Kingdom of Cochin was originally headquartered at Perumpadappu; however, due to the annexation, the kingdom was forced to shift its capital (c. 1405) further south, first to Kodungallur and then to Kochi. In the 15th century, Cochin was reduced to a vassal state of Kozhikode, thus leading to the emergence of Kozhikode as the most powerful kingdom in the medieval Malabar Coast.

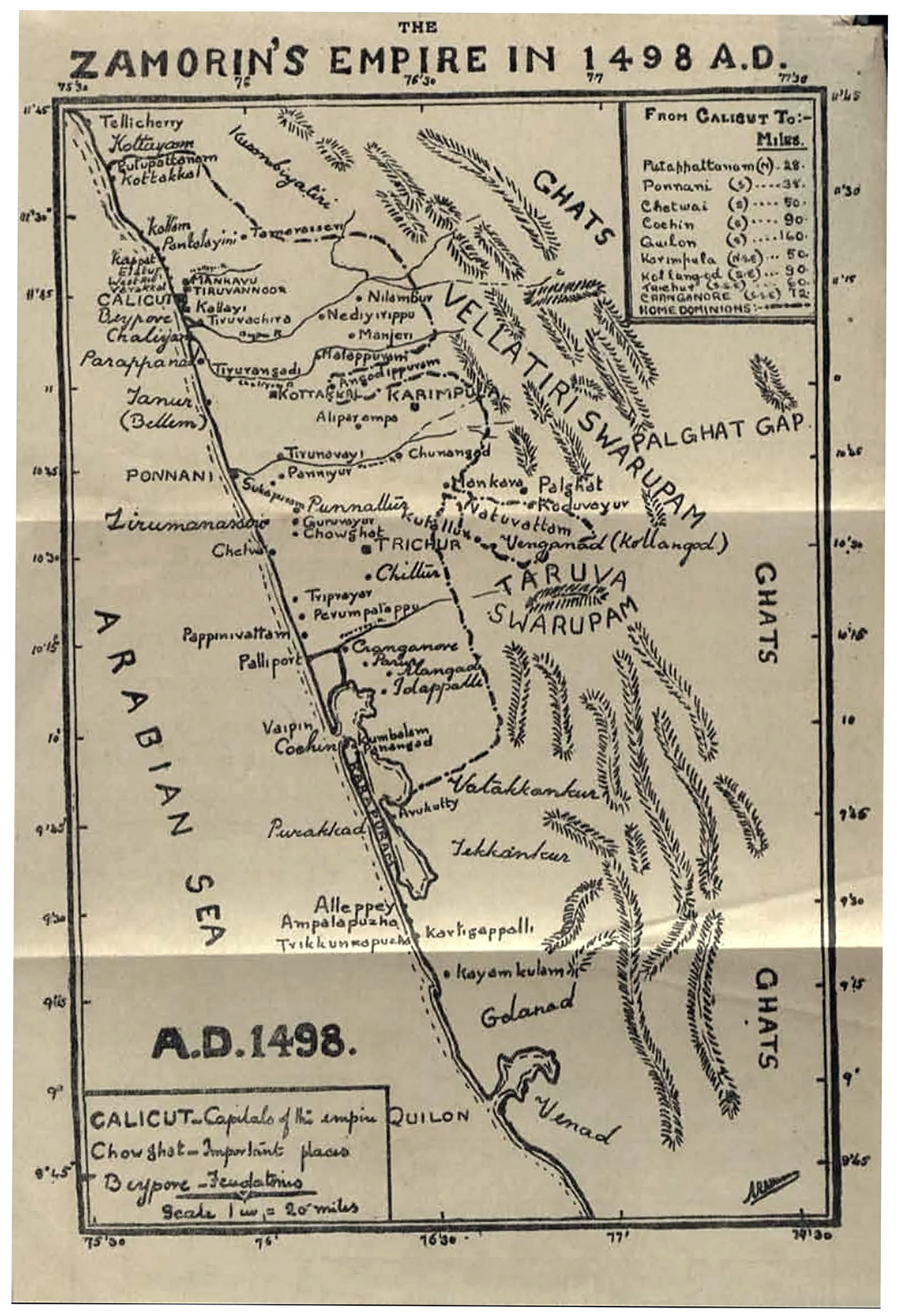
The Zamorin's empire in 1498. It was the most powerful kingdom in Malayalam-speaking region during Middle Ages.

At the peak of their reign, the Zamorins of Kozhikode ruled over a region from Kollam (Quilon) in the south to Panthalayini Kollam (Koyilandy) in the north. Ibn Battuta (1342–1347), who visited Kozhikode six times, gives the earliest glimpses of life in the city—he described Kozhikode as "one of the great ports of the district of Malabar" where "merchants of all parts of the world are found". The king of this place, he says, "shaves his chin just as the Haidari Fakeers of Rome do... The greater part of the Muslim merchants of this place are so wealthy that one of them can purchase the whole freightage of such vessels put here and fit-out others like them". The Chinese sailor Ma Huan (1403), as part of the Imperial Chinese fleet under Zheng He, described the city as a great emporium of trade frequented by merchants from around the world. He noted the 20 or 30 mosques built to cater to the religious needs of the Muslims, the unique system of calculation by the merchants using their fingers and toes (followed to this day), and the matrilineal system of succession. Abdur Razzak (1442–43), Niccolò de' Conti (1445), Afanasy Nikitin (1468–74), Ludovico di Varthema (1503–1508), and Duarte Barbosa witnessed the city as one of the major international trading centres on the Indian subcontinent.

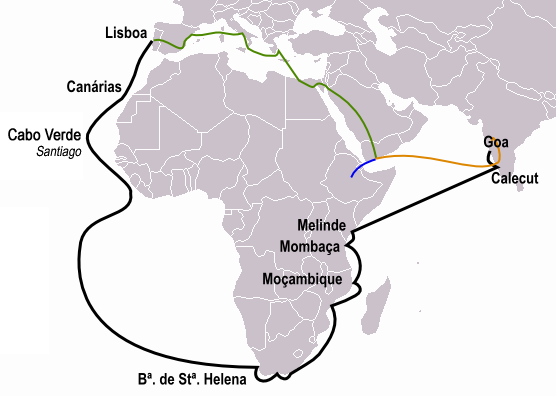
The route Vasco da Gama took to reach Kozhikode (black line) in 1498. The discovery of this sea route from Europe to India eventually led to European colonisation of the Indian subcontinent. At that time, the Zamorin of Kozhikode resided at Ponnani.

The Portuguese arrived at Kappad, Kozhikode, in 1498 during the Age of Discovery, thus opening a direct sea route from Europe to South Asia. The Kunjali Marakkars, who were the naval chiefs of the Zamorin of Kozhikode, are credited with organizing the first naval defense of the Indian coast. In 1664, the municipality of Fort Kochi was established by Dutch Malabar, making it the first municipality on the Indian subcontinent; it was later dissolved when Dutch authority weakened in the 18th century. Under British Raj, Kozhikode acted as the headquarters of Malabar District; the port held the superior economic and political position in medieval Kerala coast, while Kannur, Kollam, and Kochi were commercially important secondary ports, where the traders from various parts of the world would gather.

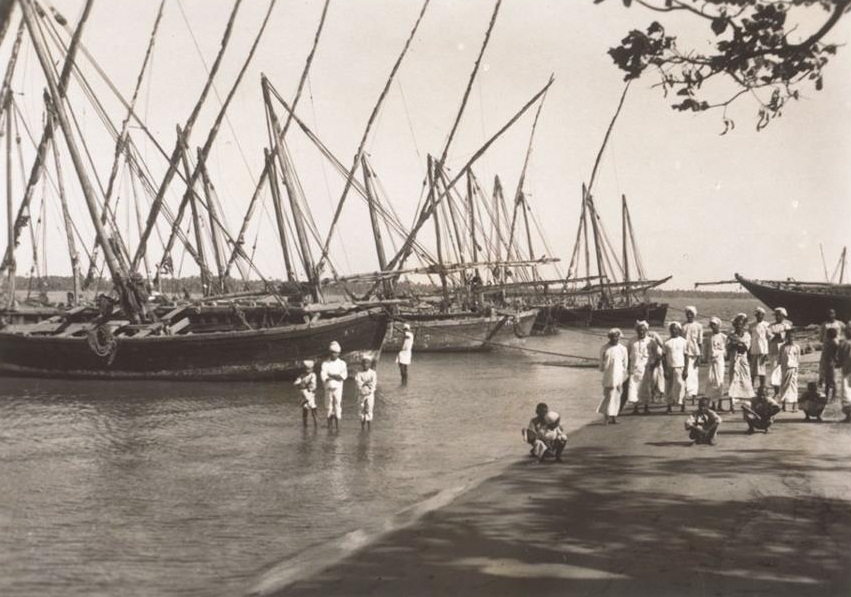
Ponnani harbour in mid-1930s

South Malabar was the cultural capital of medieval Kerala. The region was and still is the main hub of Malayalam literature. Tirunavaya, the hub of the Mamankam festival, and Ponnani, the largest hub of Islamic studies in Kerala during the Middle Ages, were located in South Malabar. The Kerala school of astronomy and mathematics flourished between the 14th and 16th centuries and was based in the Kingdom of Tanur. In attempting to solve astronomical problems, the school independently created a number of important mathematics concepts, including series expansion for trigonometric functions.

Azhvanchery Thamprakkal, the feudal lords of Athavanad who were considered the supreme head of Nambudiri Brahmins of Kerala during the Middle Ages, were also natives of South Malabar. Additionally, South Malabar was home to the prominent figures like Thunchaththu Ezhuthachan, Poonthanam Nambudiri, Melpathur Narayana Bhattathiri, Kunchan Nambiar, and Zainuddin Makhdoom II.

=== Colonial period ===
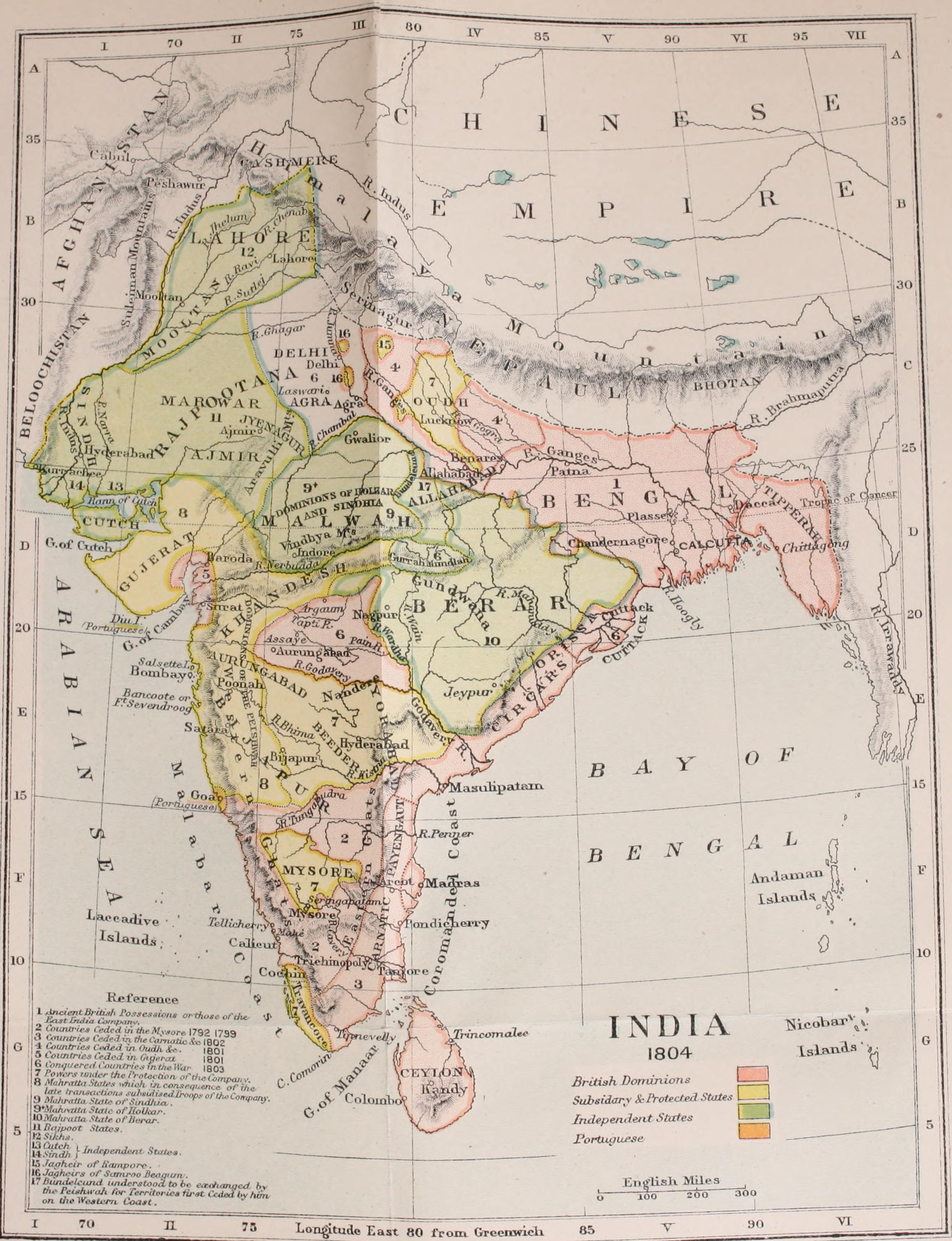
Map of India in 1804. Note that only Thalassery, Kozhikode, and Kochi are marked as cities within present-day Kerala.

Malabar District during the 1951 census of India

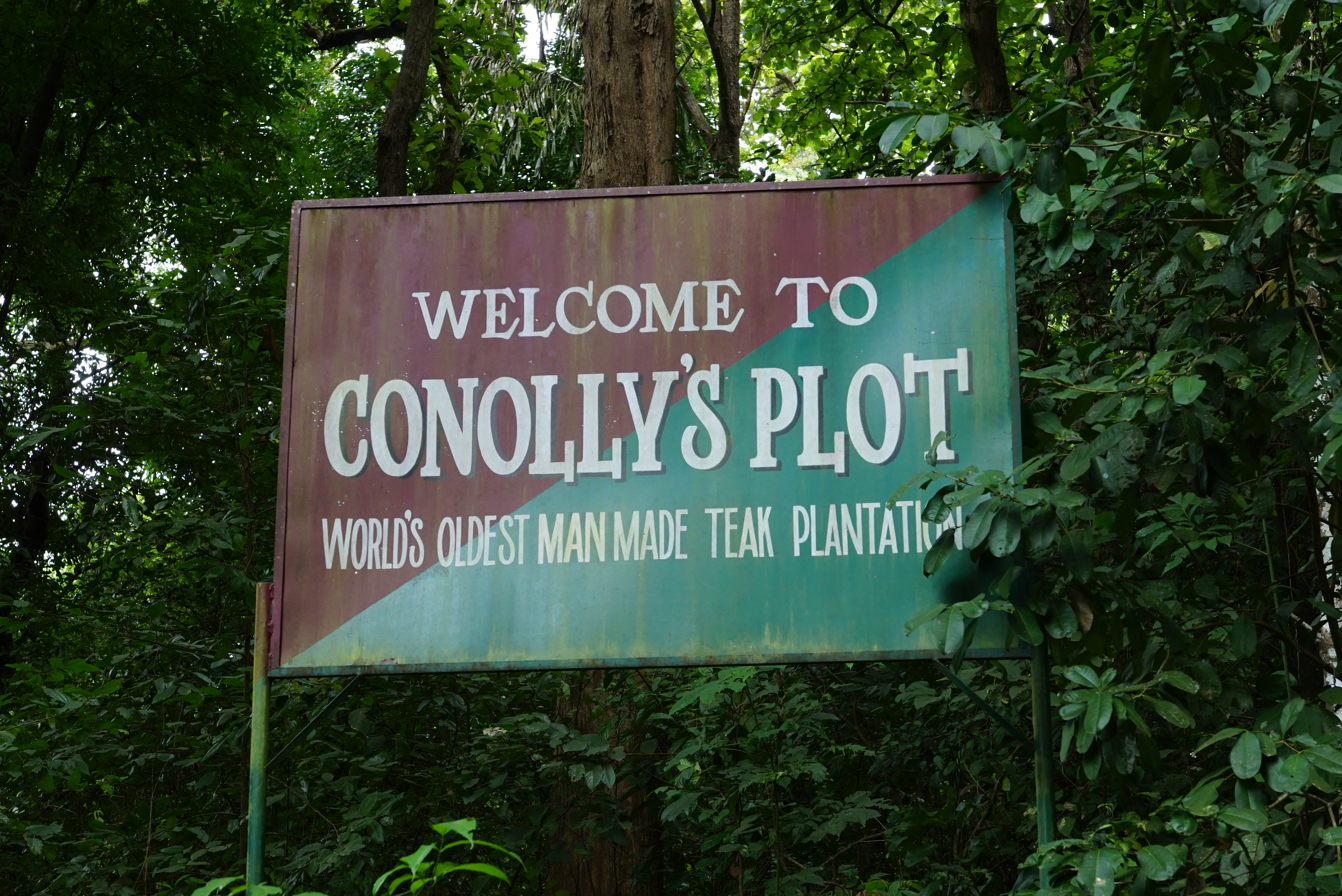
Conolly's plot, the world's oldest teak plantation at Nilambur in eastern Eranad, was planted in the 1840s by District Collector H. V. Conolly.

The northern parts of Kerala were unified under Tipu Sultan during the last decades of the 18th century. Following his defeat in the Third Anglo-Mysore War and the subsequent Treaty of Seringapatam, the regions of Tipu's kingdom were annexed by the East India Company. After the Anglo-Mysore wars, the parts of the Malabar Coast that became British colonies were organized into a district of British India, and divided into North Malabar and South Malabar on 30 March 1793 for administrative convenience. Though the general administrative headquarters of Malabar was at Calicut (South Malabar), the special headquarters of South Malabar was at Cherpulassery, and later Ottapalam.

Initially, Malabar was placed under the Bombay Presidency. Later, in 1799–1800, Malabar and South Canara was transferred to the Madras Presidency. The oldest railway line of Kerala was laid at South Malabar in the 1860s. South Malabar was the centre of the Malabar Rebellion in 1921. On 1 November 1956, this region was annexed with the Indian state of Kerala.

=== Royal families ===
The Parappanad royal family is a cousin dynasty of the Travancore royal family. Marthanda Varma, the founder of Travancore, belonged to the Parappanad royal family.

==== Lakshmipuram Palace ====
Lakshmipuram Palace is the royal palace of the Parappanad royal families in Changanassery. It was built in 1811 during the reign of Maharani Ayilyom Thirunal Gouri Lakshmi Bayi (1791–1815) and served as a new palace for her husband Raja Raja Varma Koil Thampuran and his family members.

Raja Raja Varma Koil Thampuran was born in Neerazhi Palace in the Puzhavathu neighborhood of Changanassery, near Kavil Bhagavathy Temple. He was part of the Parappanad royal family who ruled Parappanangadi. He was the father of Swathi Thirunal Rama Varma, Maharaja of Travancore.

==== Kilimanoor palace ====
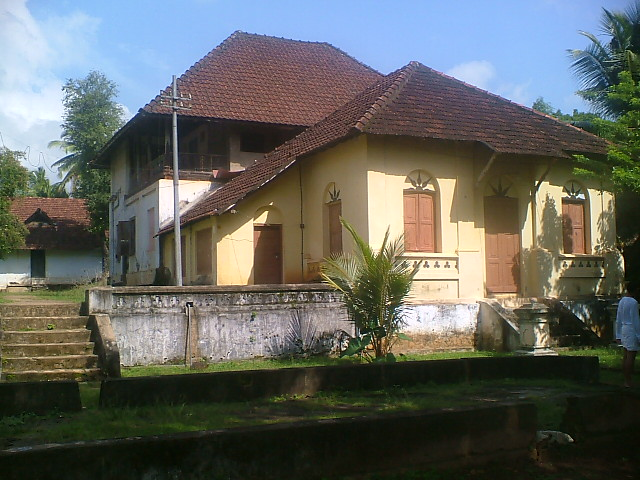
Birthplace of Raja Ravi Varma with his studio in the foreground

In 1705 (ME 880), the son and two daughters of Ittammar Raja of the Parappanad royal house were adopted into the royal house of Kilimanoor. Ittammar Raja's sister and her sons, Rama Varma and Raghava Varma, settled in Kilimanoor and married the now adopted sisters. Marthanda Varma, the founder of the Kingdom of Travancore, was the son of Raghava Varma. The nephew of Raghava Varma, Ravi Varma Koil Thampuran, married the sister of Marthanda Varma. Their son became known as Dharma Raja Kartika Thirunnal Rama Varma.

In 1740, when an allied force led by Dutchman Captain Hockert supporting the Deshinganadu King, attacked Venad, an army from Kilimanoor resisted and then defeated them. Although a small victory, this was the first time an Indian army had defeated a European power. In 1753, in recognition of this feat, Marthanda Varma exempted the areas controlled by the Kilimanoor palace from taxes and granted them autonomy. The present palace complex was built at this time, together with the Ayyappan temple for the family deity, Sastha or Ayyapan.

Velu Thampi Dalawa held meetings at Kilimanoor palace while planning uprisings against the British. He handed over his sword at the palace before going into his final battle against the British. India's first president, Rajendra Prasad, received this sword from the palace, and it was kept in the National Museum in Delhi. Afterwards, the sword was moved to the Napier Museum in Trivandrum.

Nedumpuram Palace near Thiruvalla belongs to Valluvanad royal family.

== Geography ==
Distant view of Silent Valley National Park, Kerala

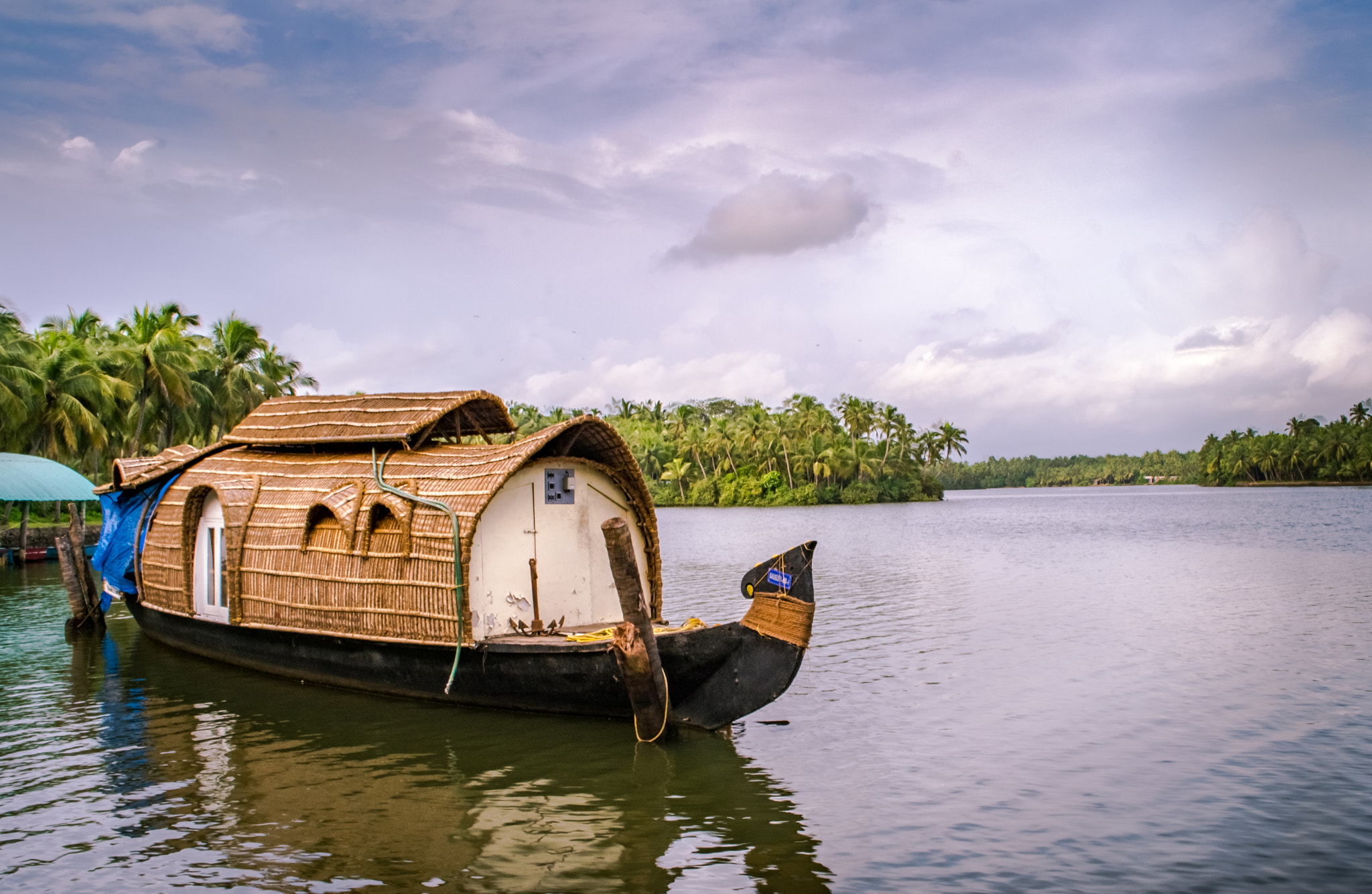
Biyyam backwater, Ponnani

The term 'South Malabar' refers to the region of the erstwhile Malabar District that lies south of the river Korapuzha and bears high cultural similarity with both the Central Kerala (Southern Thrissur region) and the North Malabar region.

Three of the largest five rivers in Kerala—the Bharathappuzha, Chaliyar, and Kadalundi—flow through South Malabar. The region also has several small and medium-sized tributaries, such as the Bhavani River, a tributary of the Kaveri. Dams have been built across tributaries of the Bharathappuzha River, the largest by dimension being the Malampuzha Dam and the largest by volume being the Parambikulam Dam. The Biyyam backwaters, canals such as the Conolly Canal, and the Ponnani Kole Wetlands are also present in South Malabar region.

The Palakkad Gap, the largest mountain pass in Kerala's Western Ghats and that connects Kerala with Tamil Nadu by road through Coimbatore city, is located in South Malabar. The region is therefore also known as "The Gateway of Kerala".

The highest peaks in the Malabar District were in the Nilambur (eastern) region of Eranad, near the Nilgiri Mountains. The 2,554 m (8,379 ft)-high Mukurthi peak, which is situated in the border of modern-day Nilambur Taluk and Ooty Taluk, was the highest point of elevation in Malabar District; today, it is the fifth-highest peak in South India and the third-highest in Kerala after Anamudi (2,696 m) and Meesapulimala (2,651 m). It is also the highest peak in Kerala outside the Idukki district. Anginda peak (2,383 m) was the second-highest peak in the district, and Vavul Mala (2,339 m) was the third-highest. Apart from the main continuous range of the Western Ghats, the region has many small undulating hills in the lowland.

South Malabar has rich biodiversity. It is home to the Nilgiri Biosphere Reserve, Karimpuzha Wildlife Sanctuary, New Amarambalam Reserved Forest, Nedumkayam Rainforest, Silent Valley National Park, and Attappadi Reserved Forest, as well as teak plantations. The eastern regions in the modern-day districts of Wayanad, Malappuram (Chaliyar valley), and Palakkad (Attappadi Valley)—which together form parts of the Nilgiri Biosphere Reserve and a continuation of the Mysore Plateau—are known for natural gold fields, along with the adjoining districts of Karnataka. The South Malabar region is nicknamed "the granary of Kerala".

In the British records, the eastern Eranad region was collectively described as "Nilambur Valley". The riverbank of the Chaliyar in Nilambur is known for natural gold fields. Mineral explorations done in the Chaliyar river valley showed reserves of the order of 2.5 million cubic meters of placers with 0.1 gram per cubic meter of gold. Eranad has several tributaries of Chaliyar and Kadalundi rivers.

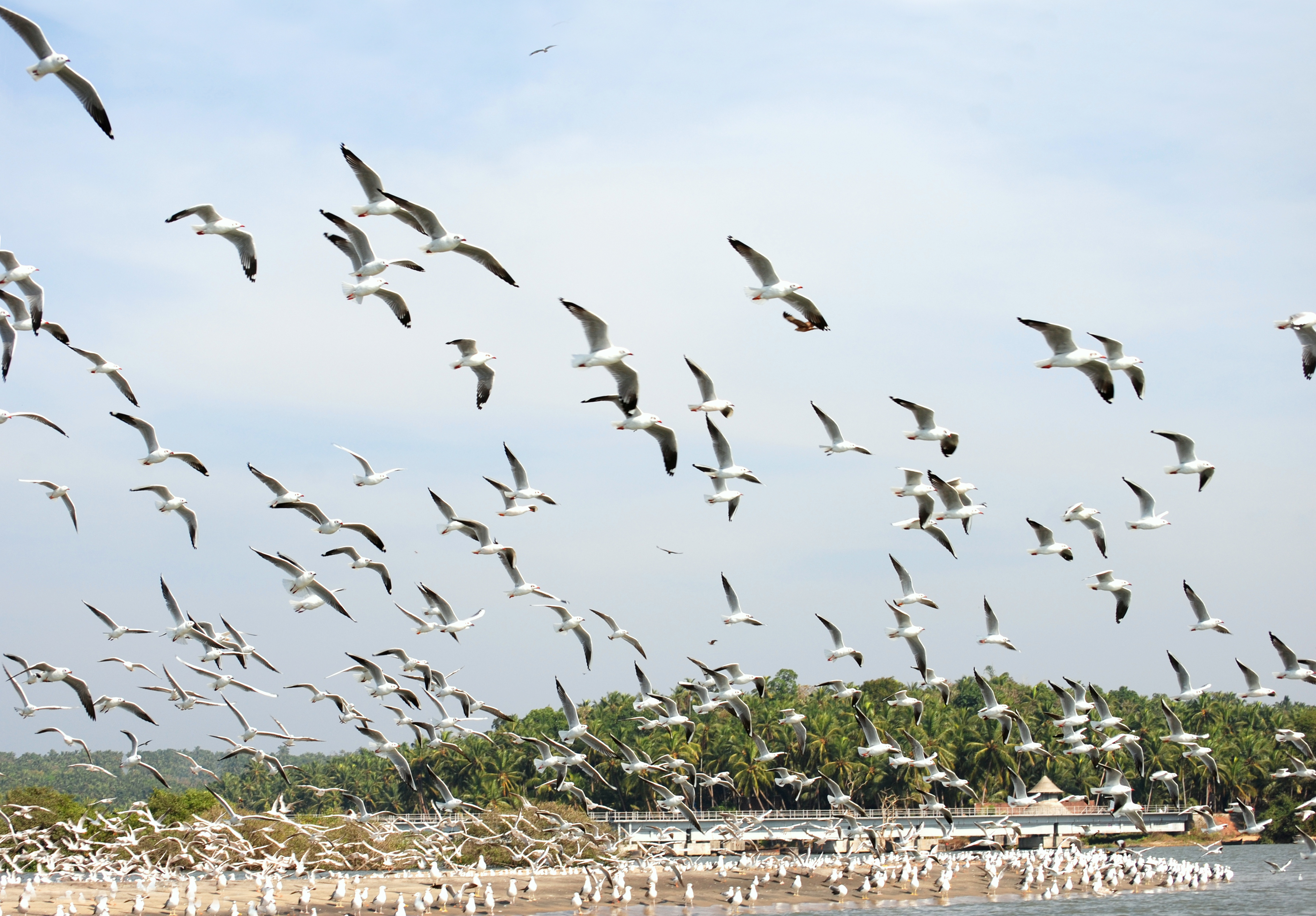
Kadalundi Bird Sanctuary

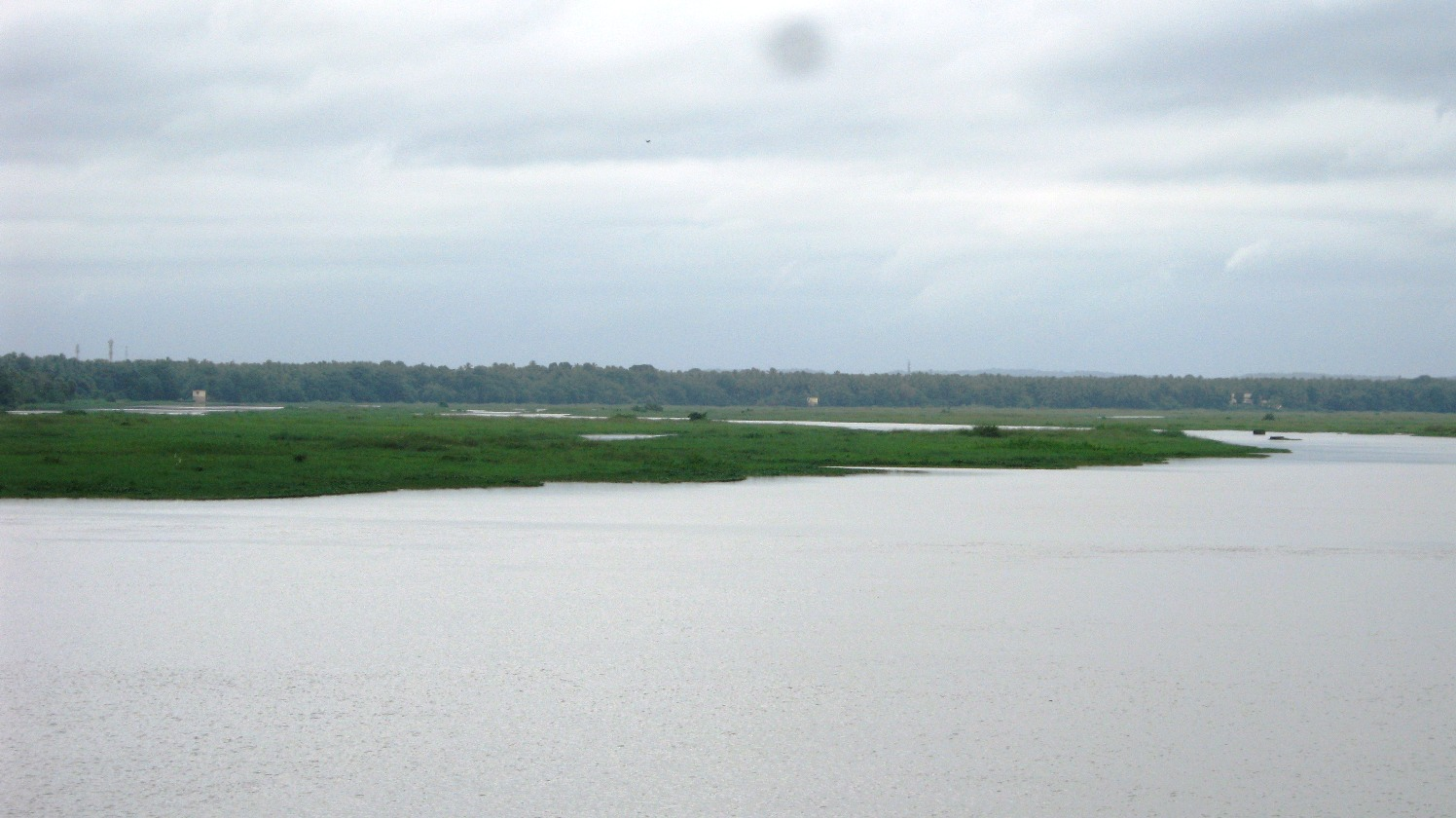
Bharathappuzha, the second-longest river in Kerala

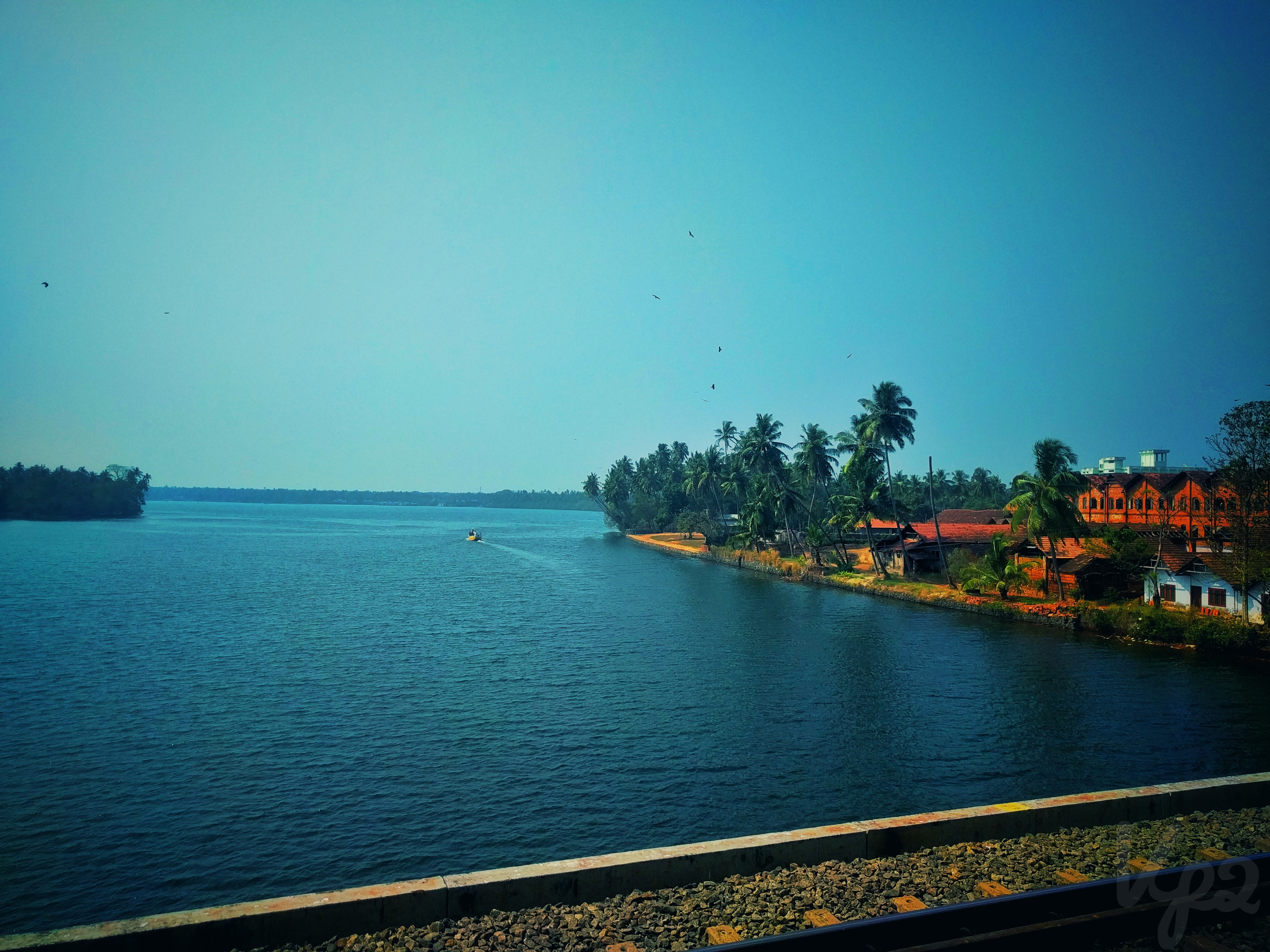
Chaliyar, the fourth-longest river in Kerala

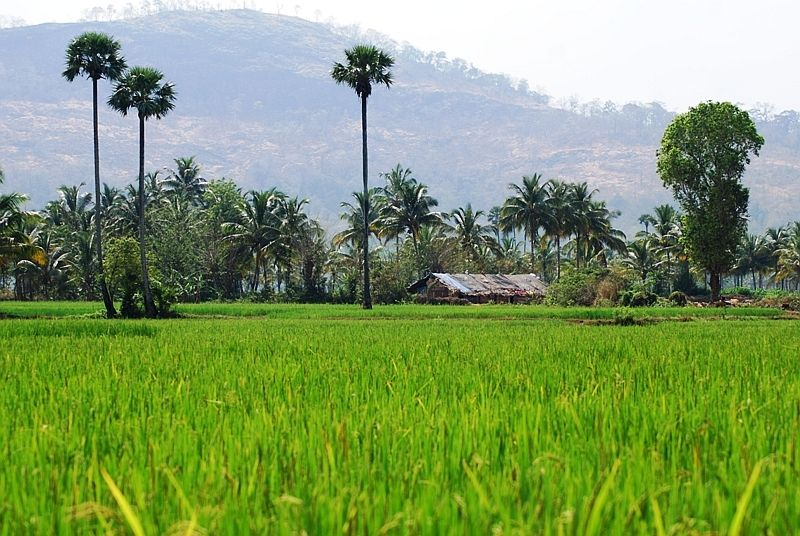
Typical Palakkadan paddy field (from Nemmara)

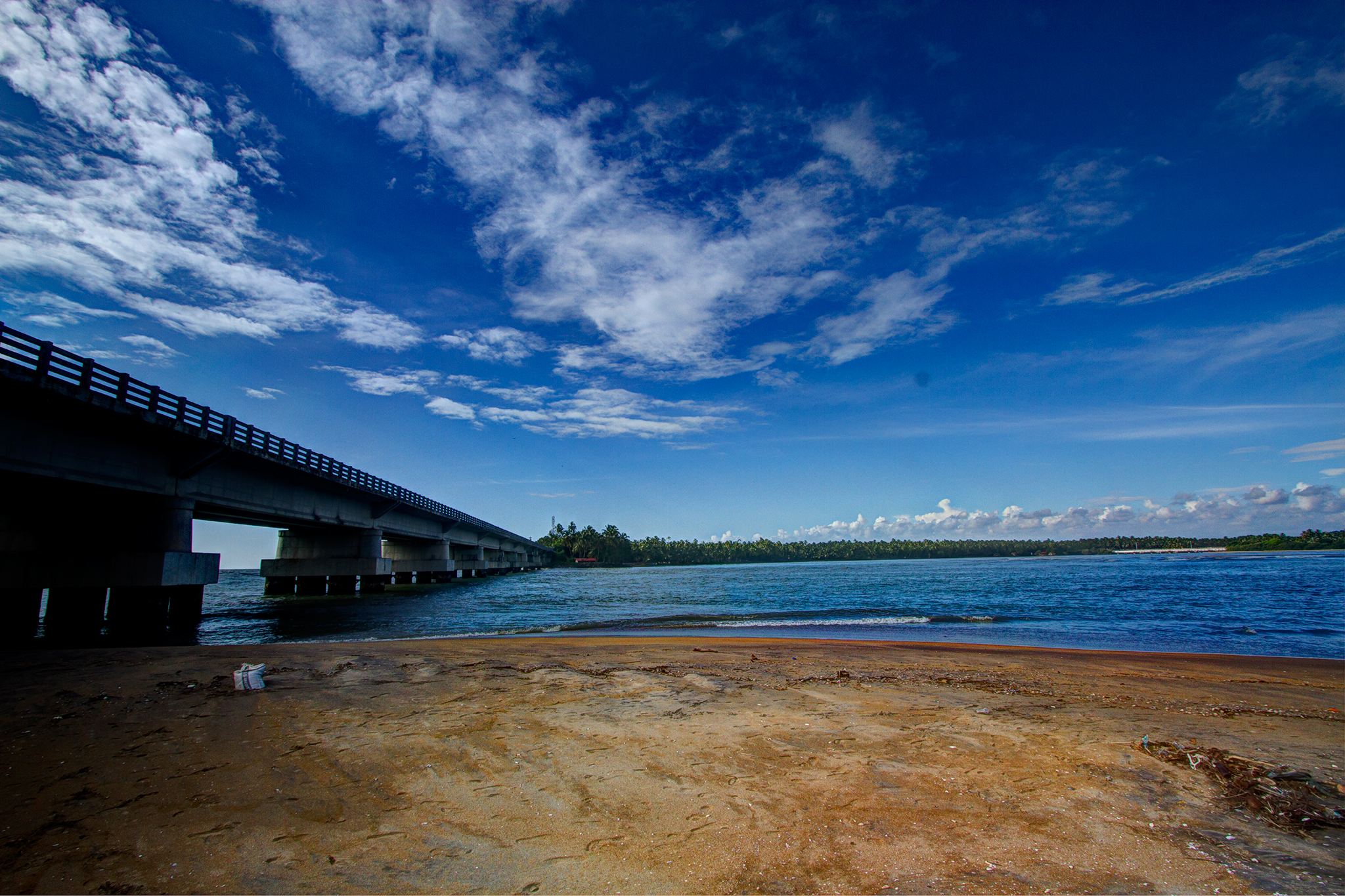
Kadalundi River, the fifth-longest river in Kerala

== Transportation ==
=== Roads ===
==== Kozhikode ====
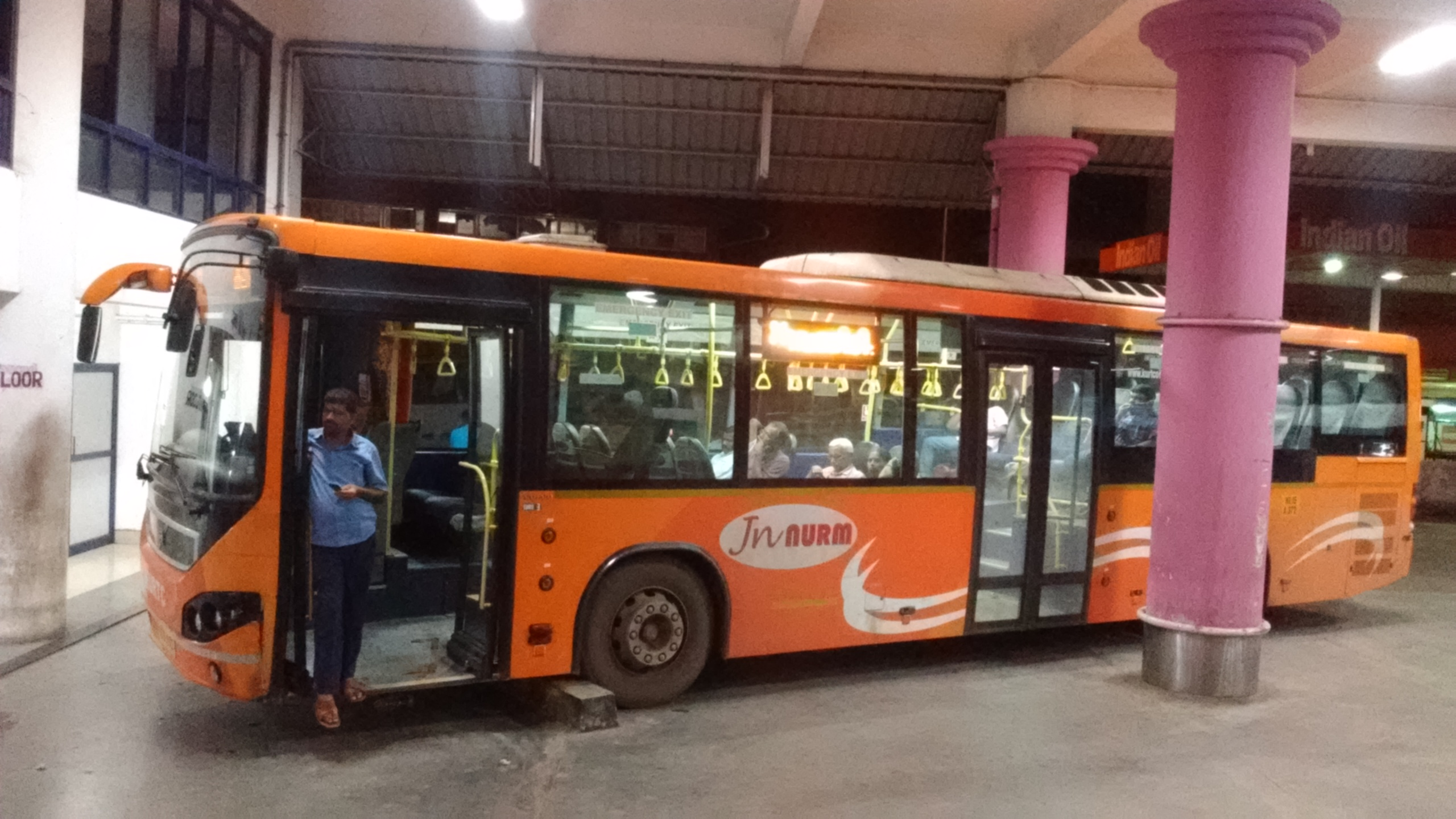
Volvo 8400 at Calicut Bus Terminal

National Highway 66 connects Kozhikode to Mumbai via Mangaluru, Udupi, and Goa to the north, and Kochi and Kanyakumari near Thiruvananthapuram to the south; it terminates at Kanyakumari, the southern tip of India. National Highway 766 connects Kozhikode to Bangalore through Kollegal in Karnataka via Mysore. National Highway 966 connects Kozhikode to Palakkad through Malappuram, as well as connects the city to the Calicut International Airport. At Ramanattukara, a suburb of Kozhikode, it joins NH 66. State highways SH 29, SH 54, SH 68, and SH 34 also run through the city.

Buses, predominantly run by individual owners, ply routes within the city and nearby locations. City buses are painted green. Kerala State Road Transport Corporation (KSRTC) runs regular services to many destinations in the state and to neighbouring states. The city has three bus stands: private buses to the suburbs and nearby towns depart from the Palayam Bus Stand; private buses to adjoining districts depart from the Mofussil Bus Stand on Indira Gandhi Road (Mavoor Road); KSRTC buses depart from the KSRTC bus stand on Indira Gandhi Road, the largest bus stand in Kerala. There are also KSRTC depots in Thamarassery, Thottilpalam, Thiruvambady, and Vatakara.

Private tour operators maintain regular luxury bus services to Mumbai, Bangalore, Coimbatore, Chennai, Vellore, Ernakulam, Trivandrum, Ooty, and Mysore, and mainly operate from the Palayam area. These are usually night services.

==== Malappuram ====
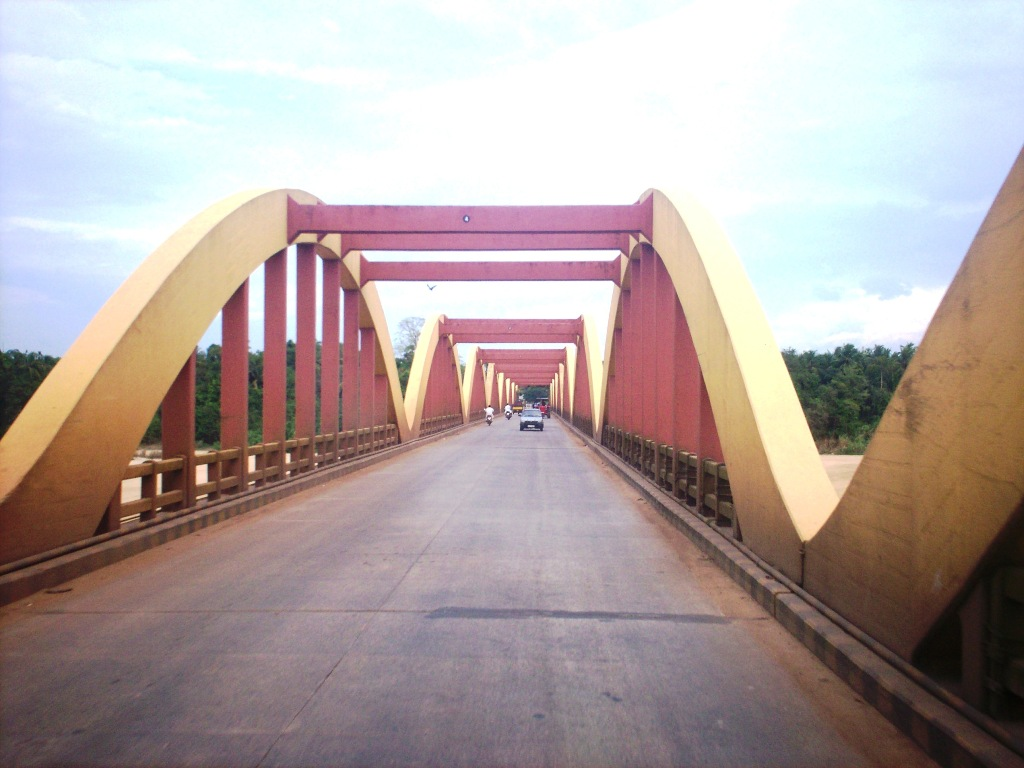
Kuttippuram bridge, built in 1953

Malappuram is well-connected by roads. There are four KSRTC stations in district. The district has two National Highways (NH 66 and NH 966) and numerous State Highways. Kerala PWD maintains 2,680 km of road in the district, of which 2,305 km are district roads and the remaining 375 km are State Highways. The Nadukani Churam Ghat Road connects Malappuram with Nilgiris. The Nadukani–Parappanangadi Road connects the coastal area of Malappuram district with the easternmost hilly border at Nadukani Churam bordering Nilgiris district of Tamil Nadu, near Nilambur.

The first modern road in the district was laid in the 18th century by Tipu Sultan. The road from Tirur to Chaliyam via Tanur, Parappanangadi, and Vallikkunnu was projected by him. Tipu had also projected the roads from Malappuram to Thamarassery, from Malappuram to Western Ghats, from Feroke to Kottakkal via Tirurangadi, and from Kottakkal to Angadipuram.

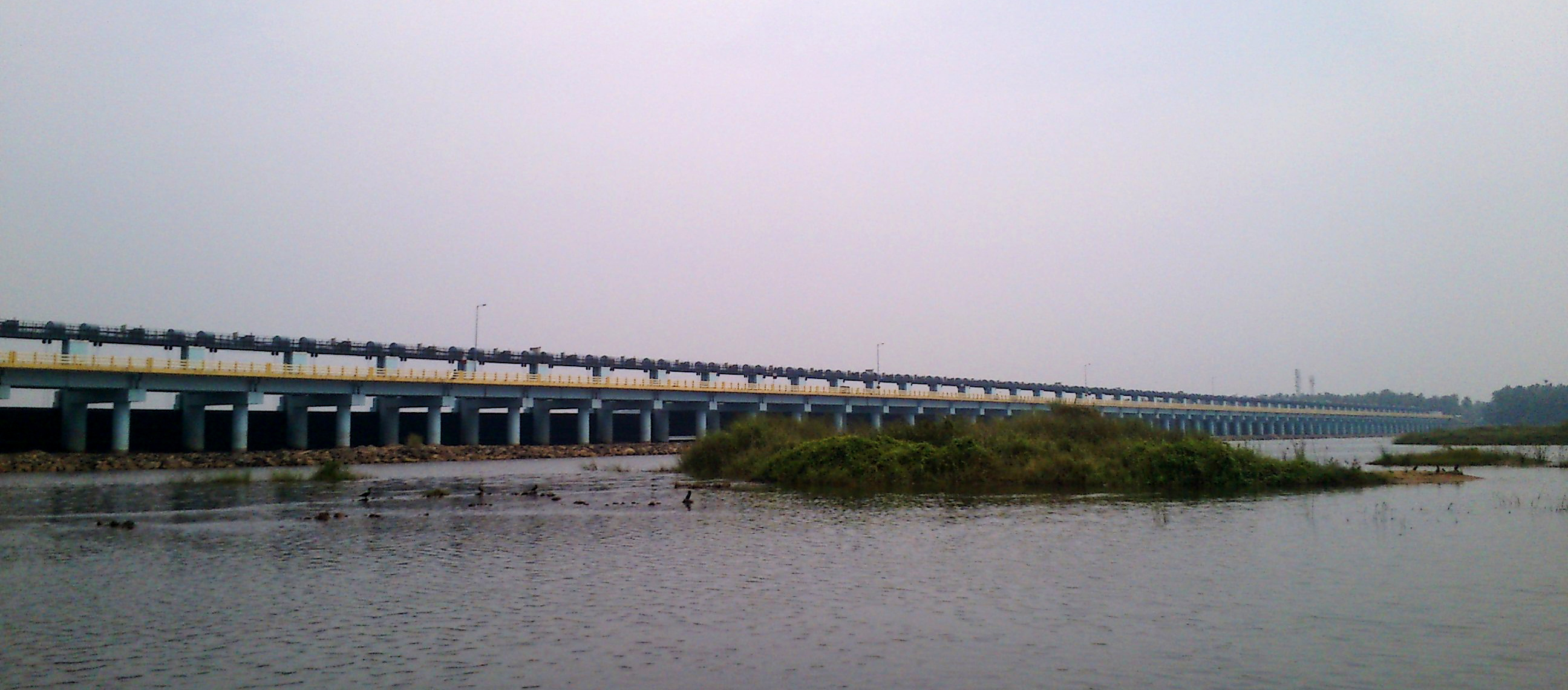
A panoramic view of Chamravattom Regulator-cum-Bridge

==== Palakkad ====
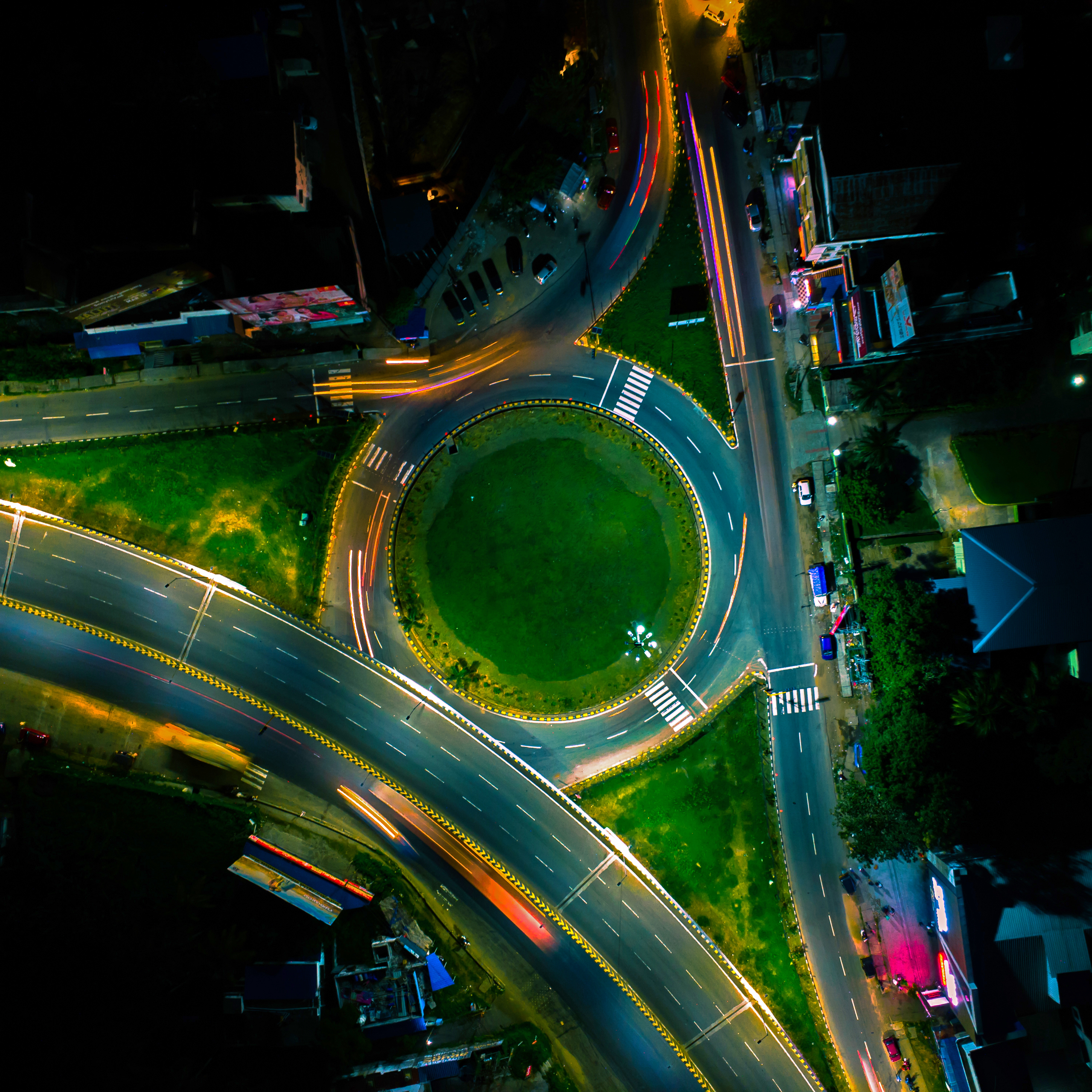
Night view of Chandranagar roundabout, Palakkad

Palakkad has a medium-grade network of roads. It is connected to National Highway 544 (Salem–Ernakulam) and National Highway 966, which starts in Palakkad and joins NH 66 at Ramanattukara in Kozhikode. Another important road is the Palakkad–Ponnani road, which connects NH 544 and NH 66.

Palakkad has four bus stations: the KSRTC Terminal Palakkad and three Private Bus stands (Stadium Bus Stand, Municipal Bus stand, and Town Bus Stand). The Palakkad KSRTC depot is the only such depot in the district, but is the second-most revenue-generating KSRTC depot in the state after Trivandrum. Stadium Bus Stand is the largest private bus stand in the city, and offers services to the city suburbs and other areas of the district, such as Thrissur and Pollachi. Services to Kozhikode, Mannarkkad, Cherpulassery, Kongad, Sreekrishnapuram, and Kadampazhipuram start from Municipal Stand. Buses to western parts of the district (Ottapalam, Shoranur, Pattambi, and towards Guruvayur) start from Town Stand.

=== Railways ===
==== Kozhikode ====
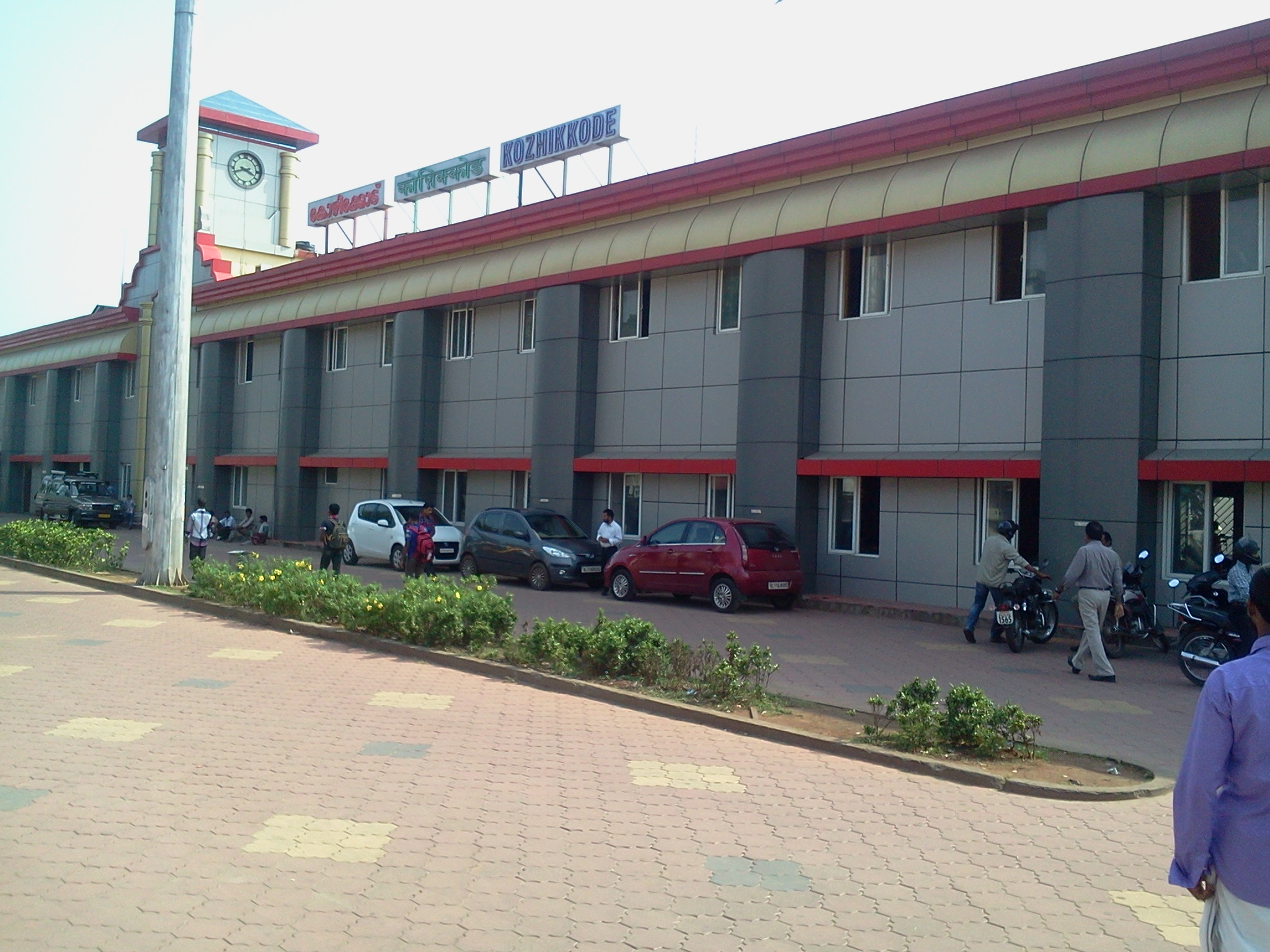
Kozhikode Railway Station is one of the busiest railway stations in South India

Kozhikode railway station, also known as Calicut railway station, is the largest railway station in the city. At ₹98 crore (equivalent to ₹143 crore or US$15 million in 2026) in revenue in 2018, it is the third largest in terms of passenger revenues in Kerala, the largest in Palakkad division, and the seventh largest in Southern Railway. The station has four platforms, two terminals, and a total of six tracks. It is a major railway stations in Kerala, with trains connecting the city to other major cities in India.

An integrated security system was installed at the station in 2012, featuring baggage scanners, CCTVs, and vehicle scanners. The 125th anniversary of the station was celebrated on 2 January 2013.

The railway line to Calicut (now Kozhikode) was opened to traffic on 2 January 1888, and at that time was western terminus of the Madras Railway. The first line in Malabar was laid between Chaliyam (at the time an important port) and Tirur. With the arrival of the new line to Calicut and its growth as an administrative centre, Chaliyam diminished in significance and the railway line to it was subsequently abandoned.

The other railway stations in Kozhikode include Ferok (code: FK), Kallayi Kozhikode South (code: KUL), Vellayil (code: VLL) and West Hill (code: WH).

==== Malappuram ====
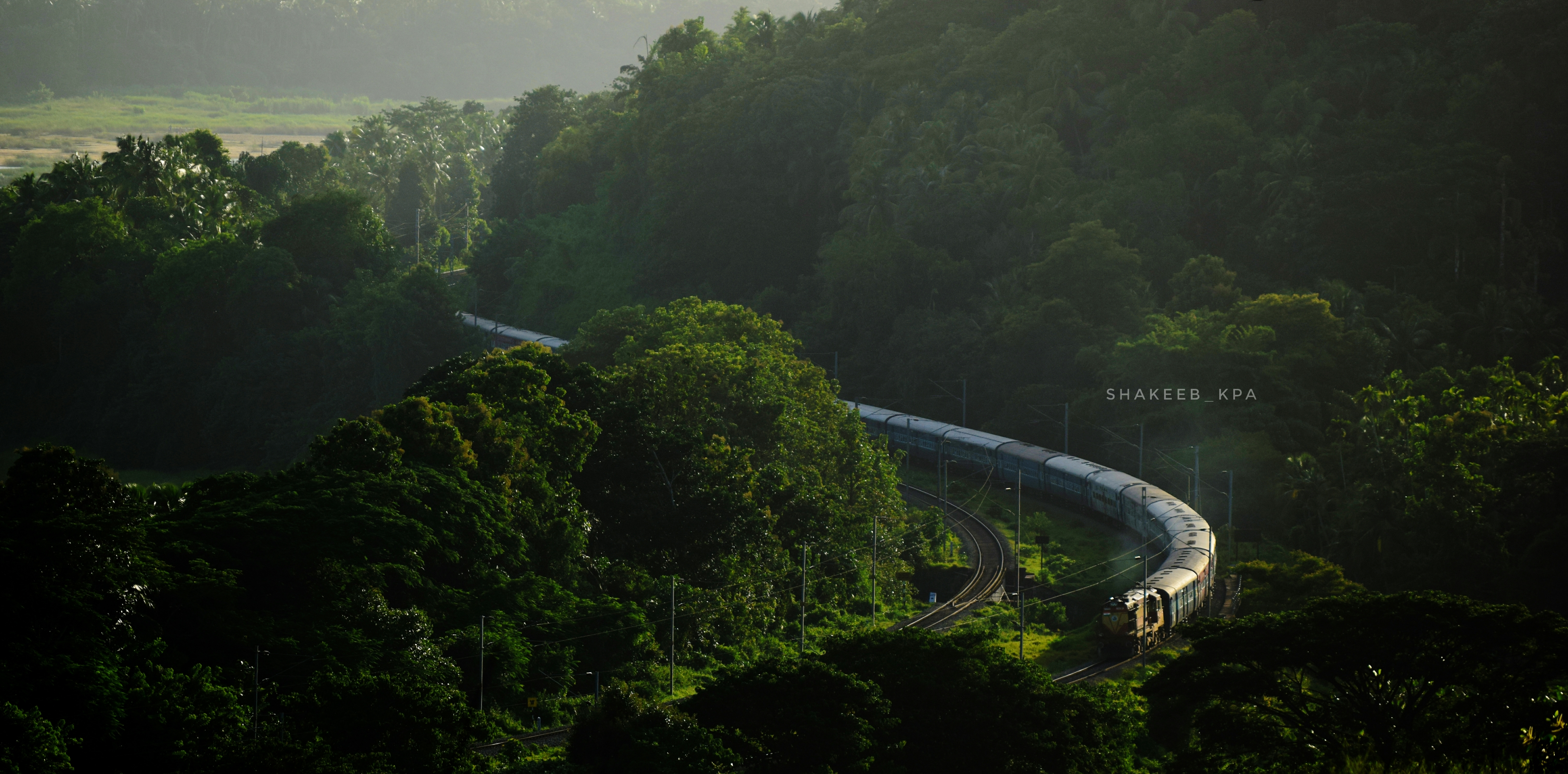
Railway at Mankeri Kunnu, Irimbiliyam near Kuttippuram

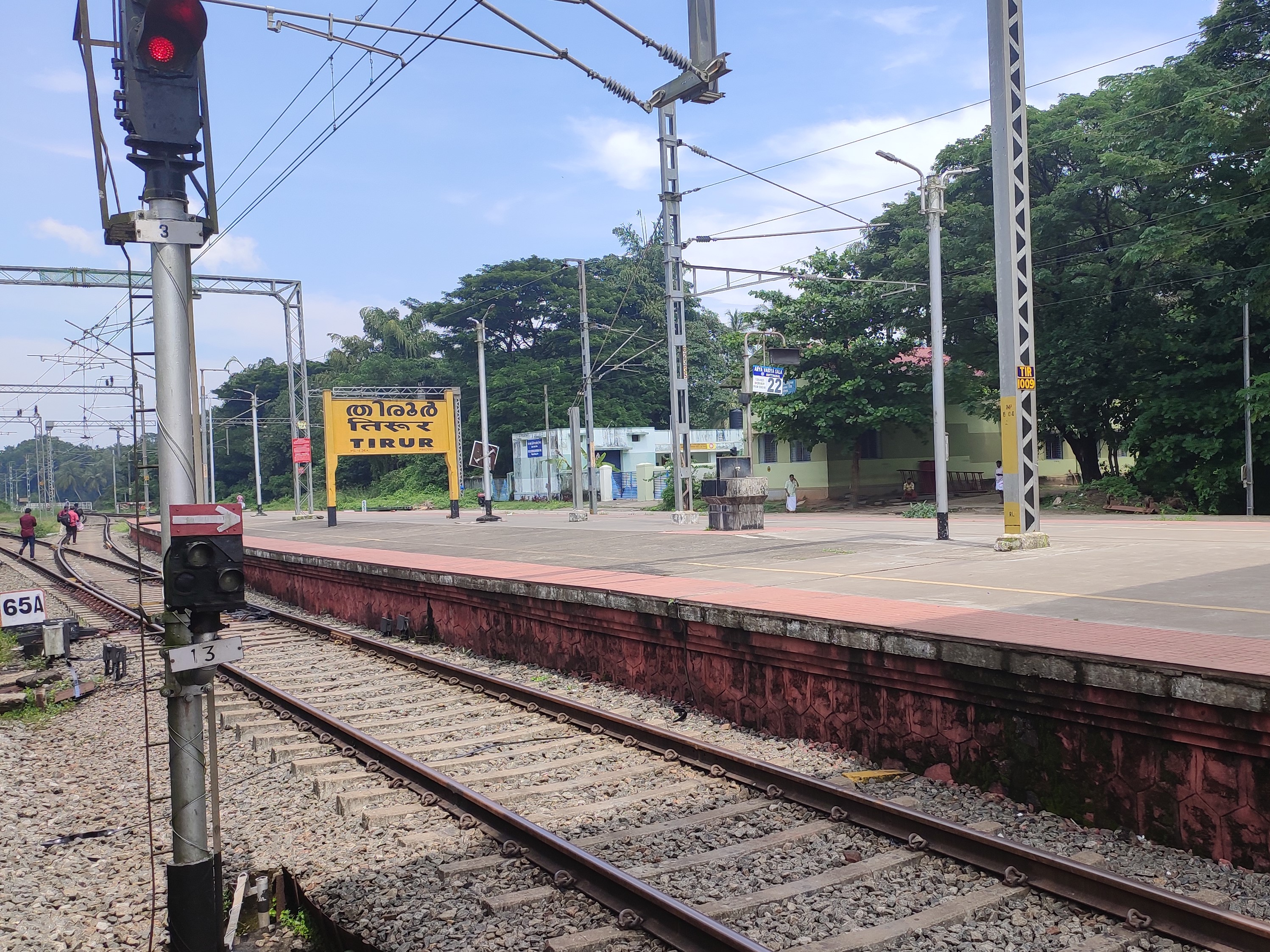
Tirur railway station, the oldest in Kerala. The state's first railway line was laid in 1861.

The Palakkad Railway Division, one of six divisions under the Southern Railway, manages the district's 142 kilometres of railways. Malappuram City is served by the railway stations at Angadipuram (17 km away), Tirur, and Parappanangadi (both 26 km, 40 minute drive away).

The history of railways in Kerala traces back to this district. The oldest railway station in the state is at Tirur. The stations at Tanur, Parappanangadi, and Vallikkunnu also form parts of the oldest railway line in the state laid from Tirur to Chaliyam. The line was inaugurated on 12 March 1861. In the same year, it was extended from Tirur to Kuttippuram via Tirunavaya. In 1862, it was further extended from Kuttippuram to Pattambi, and then from Pattambi to Podanur. The current Chennai–Mangalore railway line was later formed as an extension of this Beypore–Podanur line.

The Nilambur–Shoranur line is among the shortest as well as picturesque broad gauge railway lines in India. It was laid by the British for the transportation of Nilambur teak.

The Nilambur–Nanjangud line is a proposed railway line connecting Nilambur with Mysore. Guruvayur–Tirunavaya railway line is another proposed project. The Ministry of Railways included a railway line connecting Kozhikode–Malappuram–Angadipuram in its Vision 2020 plan. Multiple surveys have been done on the line already.

Railway stations in Malappuram District
| Angadipuram | Cherukara | Kuttippuram |
| Melattur | Nilambur Road | Parappanangadi |
| Pattikkad | Perassannur | Tanur |
| Thodikapulam | Tirunavaya | Tirur |
| Tuvvur | Vallikkunnu | Vaniyambalam |

==== Palakkad ====
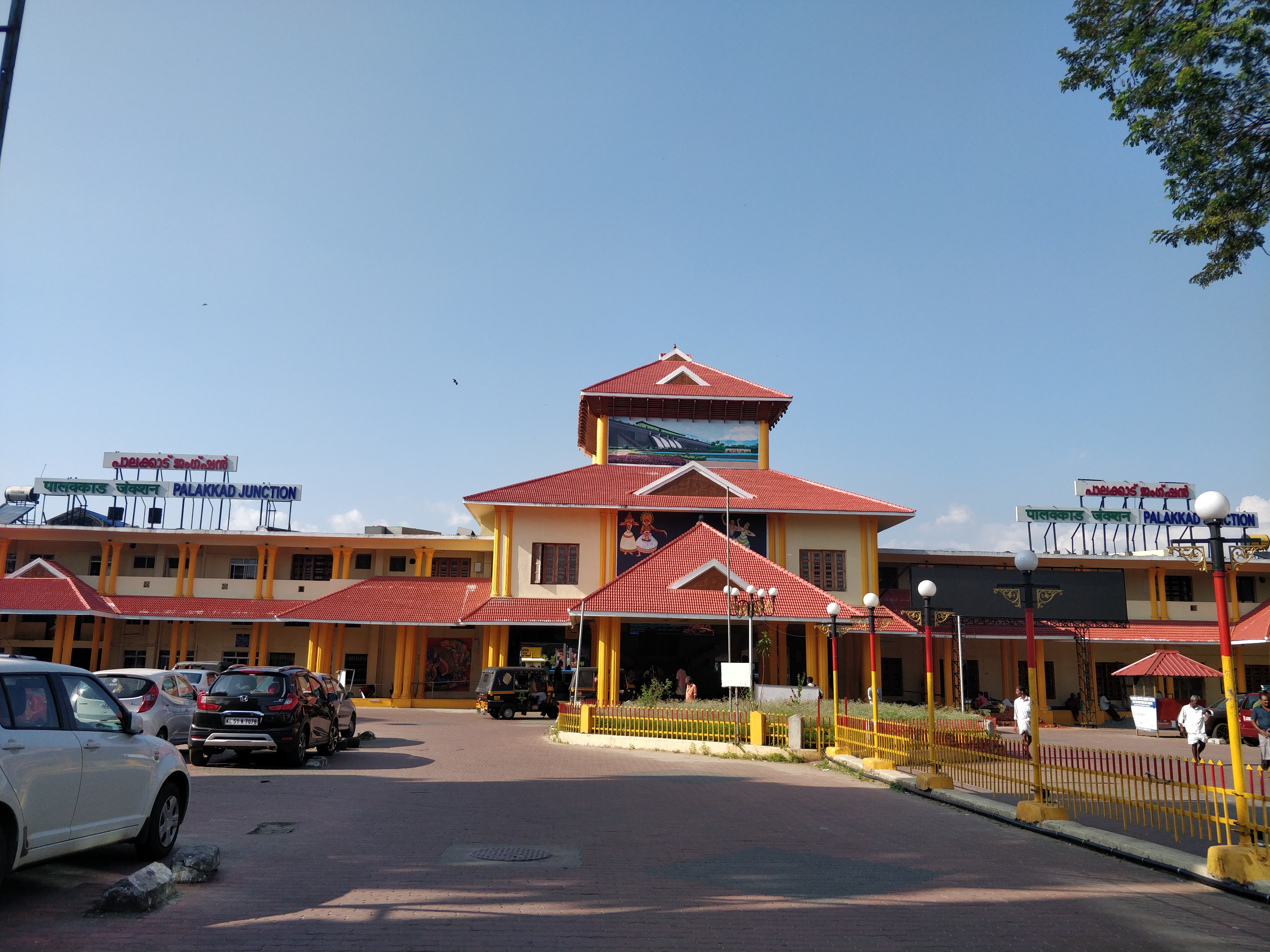
Palakkad Junction Railway Station

The Palakkad railway division, the smallest of the six administrative divisions of the Southern Railway zone of Indian Railways, is headquartered in the city of Palakkad and manages 588 kilometers of track. It is one of the oldest railway divisions in India.

The terminal facility of the Palakkad division is in Shoranur Junction and Mangalore Central of Karnataka state. The city is mainly served by two railway stations: Palakkad Junction (located at Olavakkode, about 4 km from Municipal bus stand) and Palakkad Town railway station (located in the heart of the city). Broad gauge lines connect Palakkad to the major cities of Thiruvananthapuram, Ernakulam, Coimbatore, Kozhikode, Tiruchirappalli, Salem, and Mangalore.

Shoranur Junction is the largest railway station in Kerala and plays a major role in connecting the southwestern coast of India (Mangalore) with the southeastern coast (Chennai) through Palakkad Gap. Due to its proximity to the gap, the station is the meeting point of three major railway lines: the Mangalore–Chennai line, the Nilambur–Shoranur line, and Kanyakumari–Shoranur line. It also has rail connections to the Konkan Railway, enabling travel towards Goa and Bombay.

=== Airport ===
==== Kozhikode and Malappuram ====
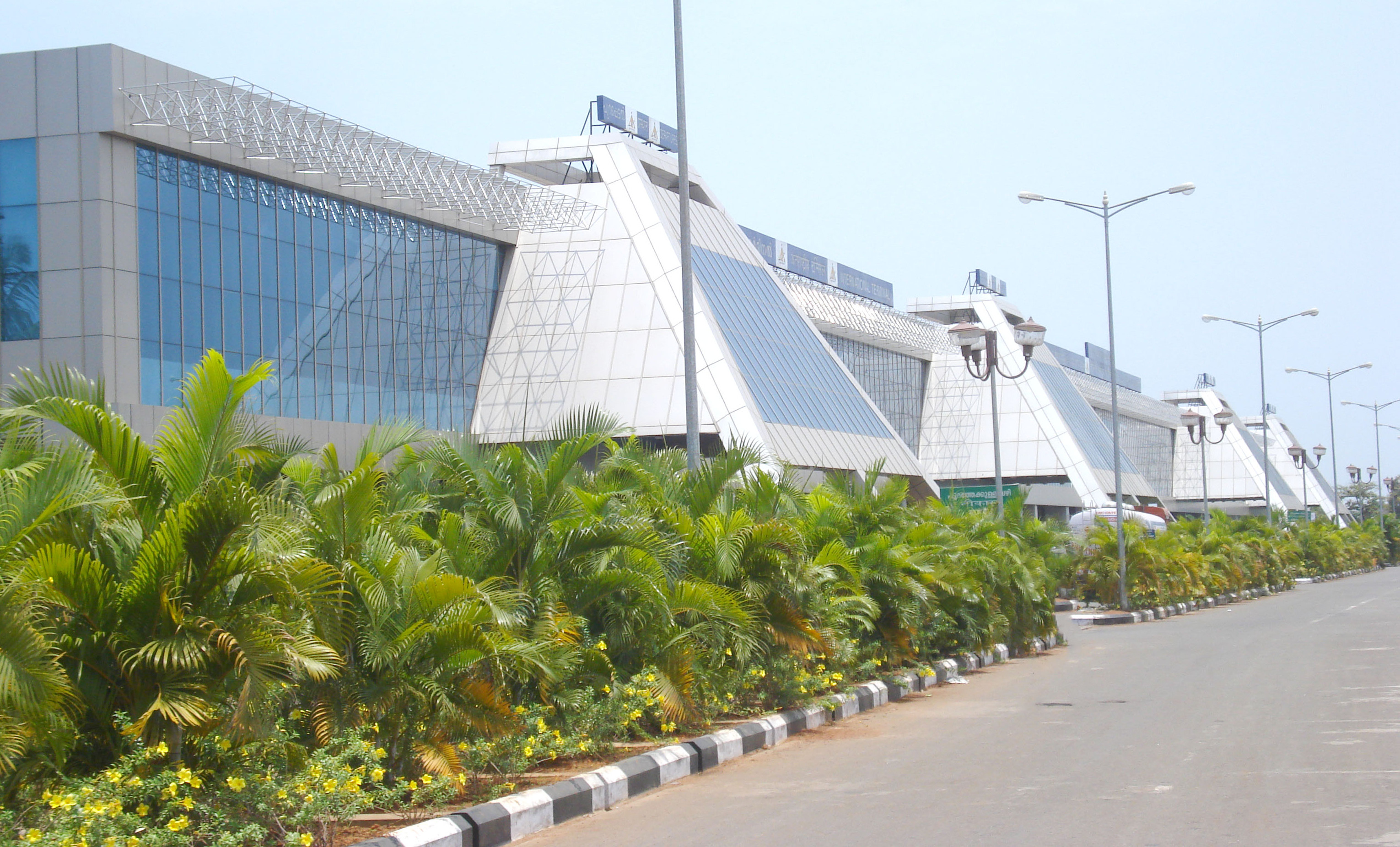
Calicut International Airport

Kozhikode and Malappuram are served by the Calicut International Airport (IATA: CCJ, ICAO: VOCL), located at Karipur. The airport started operation in April 1988. It has two terminals: one for domestic flights and another for international flights. The airport serves as an operating base for Air India Express and operates Hajj pilgrimage services to Medina and Jeddah from Kerala. There are direct buses to the airport for transportation.

According to statistics provided by the Airports Authority of India in 2019–20, it is the 17th busiest airport in the country and the third-busiest in the state.

==== Palakkad ====
The nearest international airport is Coimbatore International Airport, which is about 62 kilometres (39 mi) from Palakkad. However, Cochin International Airport and Calicut International Airport serve the city as well.

In 2011, there was a proposal by the civil aviation ministry of India for a mini domestic airport at East Yakkara to enhance air connectivity. 60 acres were identified for the project at East Yakkara Palakkad.

== Economy ==
=== Kozhikode ===
Kozhikode (Calicut) is the largest economic hub is South Malabar as well as the whole Malabar region. Nedungadi Bank, the first and oldest bank in the modern state of Kerala, was established by Appu Nedungadi at Kozhikode in the year 1899. Service sector dominates the economy, followed by industries.

Cyberpark, an organisation of the Government of Kerala, plans to build, operate, and manage two IT parks for the promotion and development of investment in IT and ITES industries in the Malabar region of Kerala. It would be the third IT hub in the state, and create a total 100,000 direct job opportunities. Other planned projects include the Birla IT Park (at Mavoor), and Malaysian satellite city (at Kinaloor) where KINFRA plans to set up a 160-hectare (400-acre) industrial park.

In 2012, Kozhikode was given the tag of "City of Sculptures" ("Shilpa Nagaram") because of the architectural sculptures around the city.

==== Shopping ====
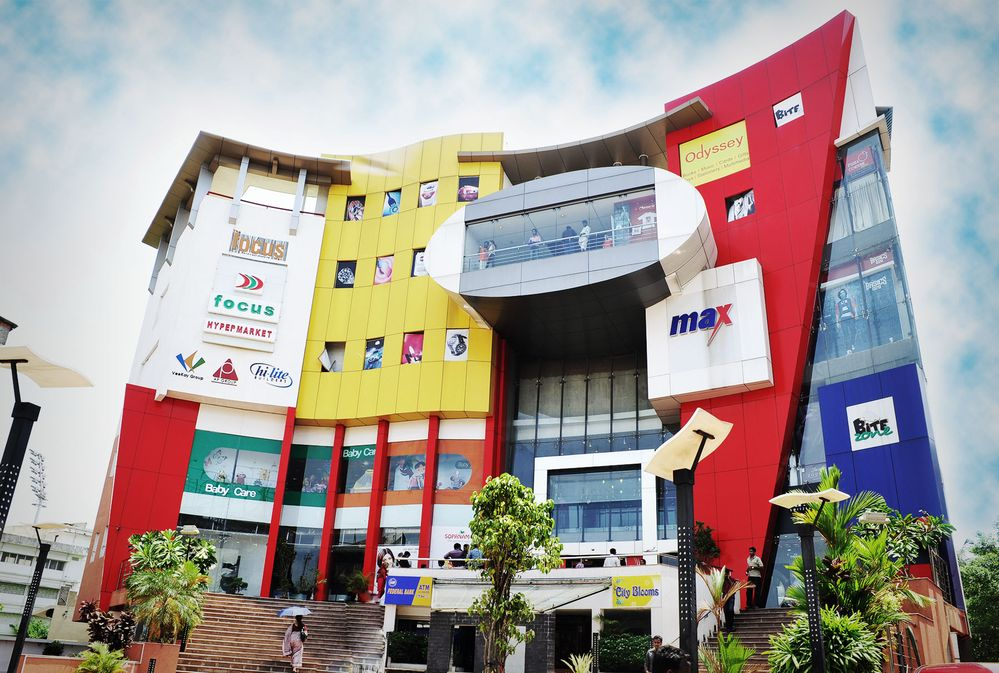
Focus Mall in Kozhikode, the first shopping mall of its kind in Kerala

The city has a strong mercantile aspect. The main area of business was once Valiyangadi ("Big Bazaar") near the railway station, but has since shifted to other parts of the city. The commercial heart has moved to Mittai Theruvu (Sweetmeat Street, or S. M. Street), a long street crammed with shops that sell everything from saris to cosmetics. It also houses restaurants and sweetmeat shops. Today, the city has multiple shopping malls, including Focus Mall (first mall of Kerala), HiLITE Mall, Address Mall, and RP Mall.

=== Malappuram ===
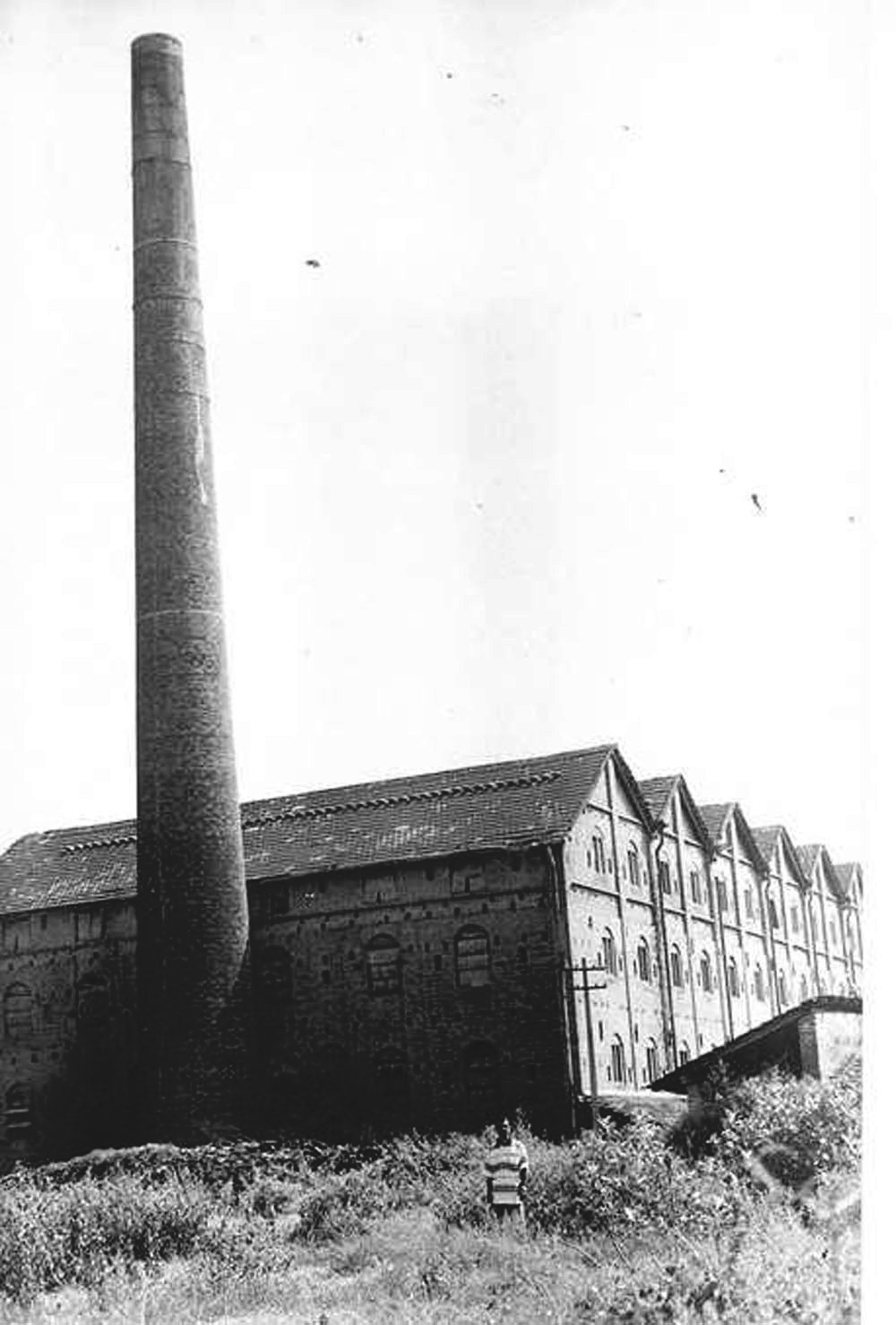
Kodakkal Tile Factory

The gross district value added (GDVA) of Malappuram in the fiscal year 2018–19 was estimated as ₹ 698.37 billion, with a growth of 11.30% compared to the previous year. The growth rate of GDVA showed a zigzag trend between 2012 and 2017. The per capita GDVA was calculated as ₹ 154,463. The net district value added (NDVA) of the district in 2018–19 was ₹ 631.90 billion, and the annual growth rate was 11.59%.

The economy of Malappuram significantly depends upon emigrants. Malappuram has the most emigrants in the state. According to the 2016 economic review report published by the Government of Kerala, every 54 per 100 households in the district are emigrant households. Most of them work in the Middle East.

The headquarters of Kerala Gramin Bank is situated at Malappuram.

The Kodakkal Tile Factory was run by the Commonwealth Trust at Kodakkal, Tirunavaya, and started in 1887. It is the second tile-manufacturing industry in India. (The first tile factory was at Feroke, which was a part of the then Eranad Taluk.)

=== Palakkad ===
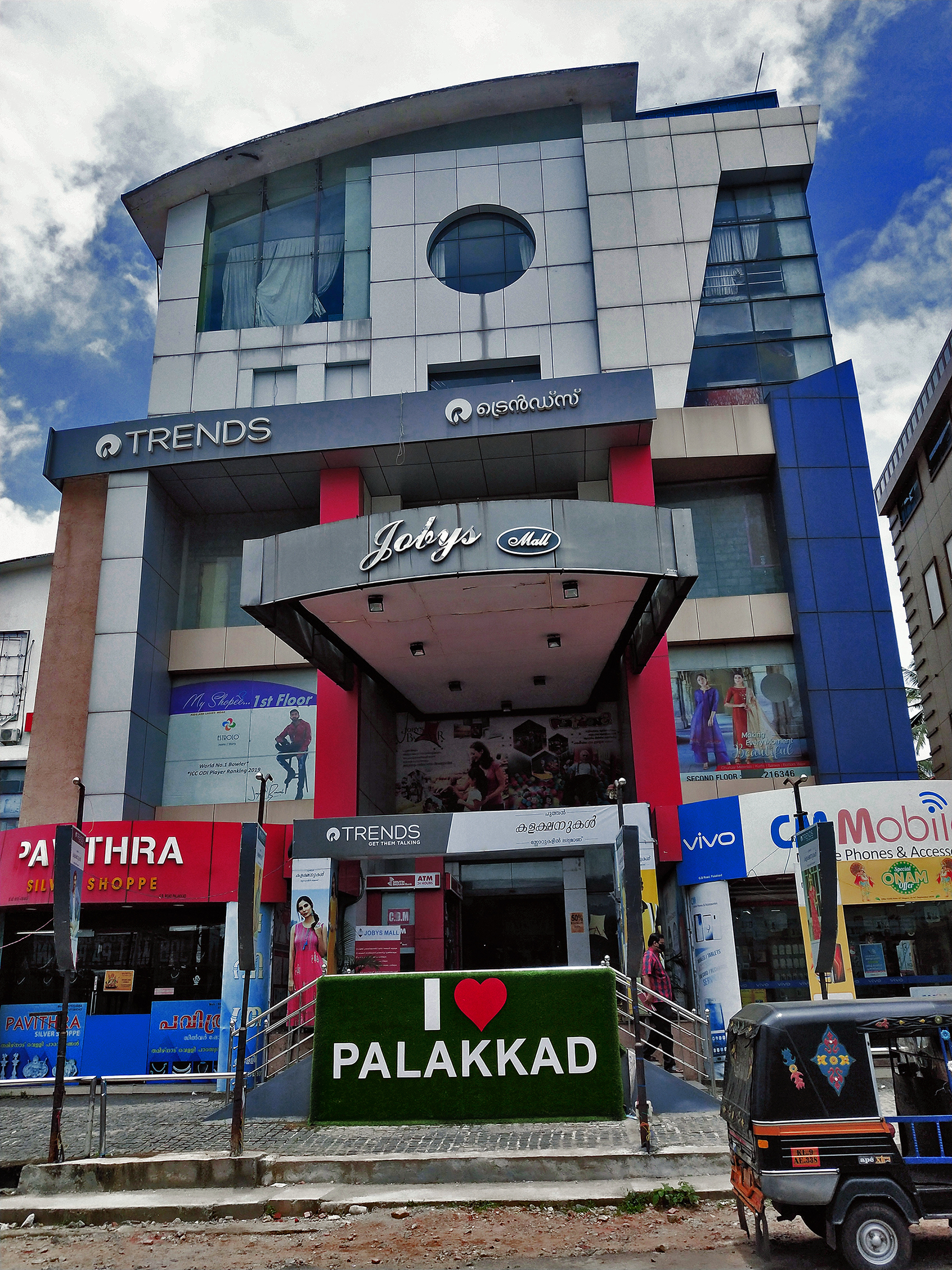
Joby's Mall, the first mall in Palakkad

The presence of Palakkad Gap and proximity to Coimbatore make Palakkad economically important. Palakkad City is one of the largest industrial hubs in Kerala. The Kanjikode area of Palakkad is the second-largest industrial hub of Kerala after Kochi, and home to production facilities for companies like Indian Telephone Industries Limited (ITI), Instrumentation Limited, Fluid Control Research Institute, Saint-Gobain India Private Limited, Patspin India Ltd, Pepsi, PPS steel (Kerala) Pvt Ltd, United breweries, Empee Distilleries, Marico, BEML, Rubfila International Ltd, and Arya Vaidya Pharmacy.

The commercialization of Palakkad City has experienced steady economic growth in recent years. The developments are mainly concentrated on the bypass roads, and include housing develops, shopping centres, hotels, and restaurants.

== Education ==
=== Kozhikode ===
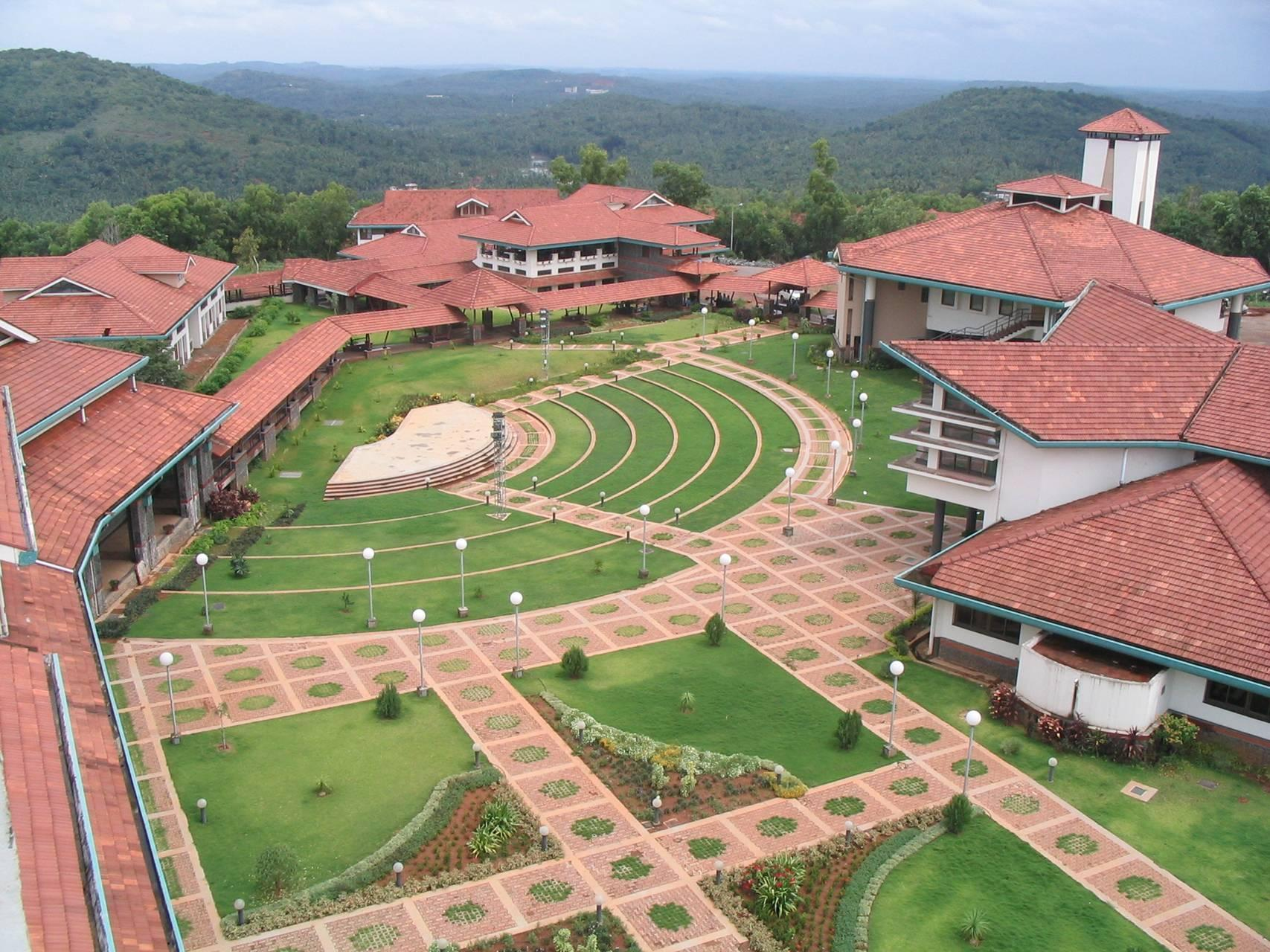
Indian Institute of Management Kozhikode

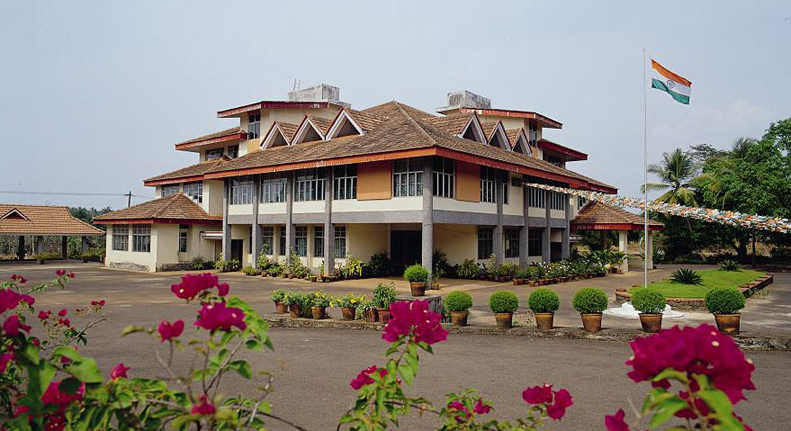
National Institute of Technology Calicut

There are 1,237 schools in Kozhikode district, including 191 high schools.

Kozhikode is home to two premier educational institutions of national importance: the Indian Institute of Management Kozhikode, and the National Institute of Technology Calicut. Other institutions include the National Institute for Research and Development in Defence Shipbuilding, Indian Institute of Spices Research, and National Institute of Electronics and Information Technology.

Recently, Kozhikode got Kerala's first residential International Baccalaureate continuum school, The White School International. It is located in Perumanna and was established in 2016.

The University of Calicut is the largest university in Kerala. It is located in Thenjipalam, about 24 kilometres (15 mi) south of Calicut. This university was established in 1968 and was the second university established in Kerala. Most of the colleges offering tertiary education in the region are affiliated with this university. The Calicut Medical College was established in 1957 as the second medical college in Kerala. Since then, the institution has grown into a premier centre of medical education in the state. Presently it is the largest medical institute in the state, with a yearly intake of 250 candidates for its undergraduate programme.

In 1877, a school for young Rajas was started in Kozhikode. This was later opened to Hindu boys of all castes. In 1879, it was affiliated with the University of Madras as a second-grade college, bolstering collegiate education in the district. Secondary education has recorded appreciable progress since 1915. The erstwhile Malabar District (of which the present-day Kozhikode district formed a part) holds a high rank among the districts of the Madras Presidency in secondary education.

=== Malappuram ===
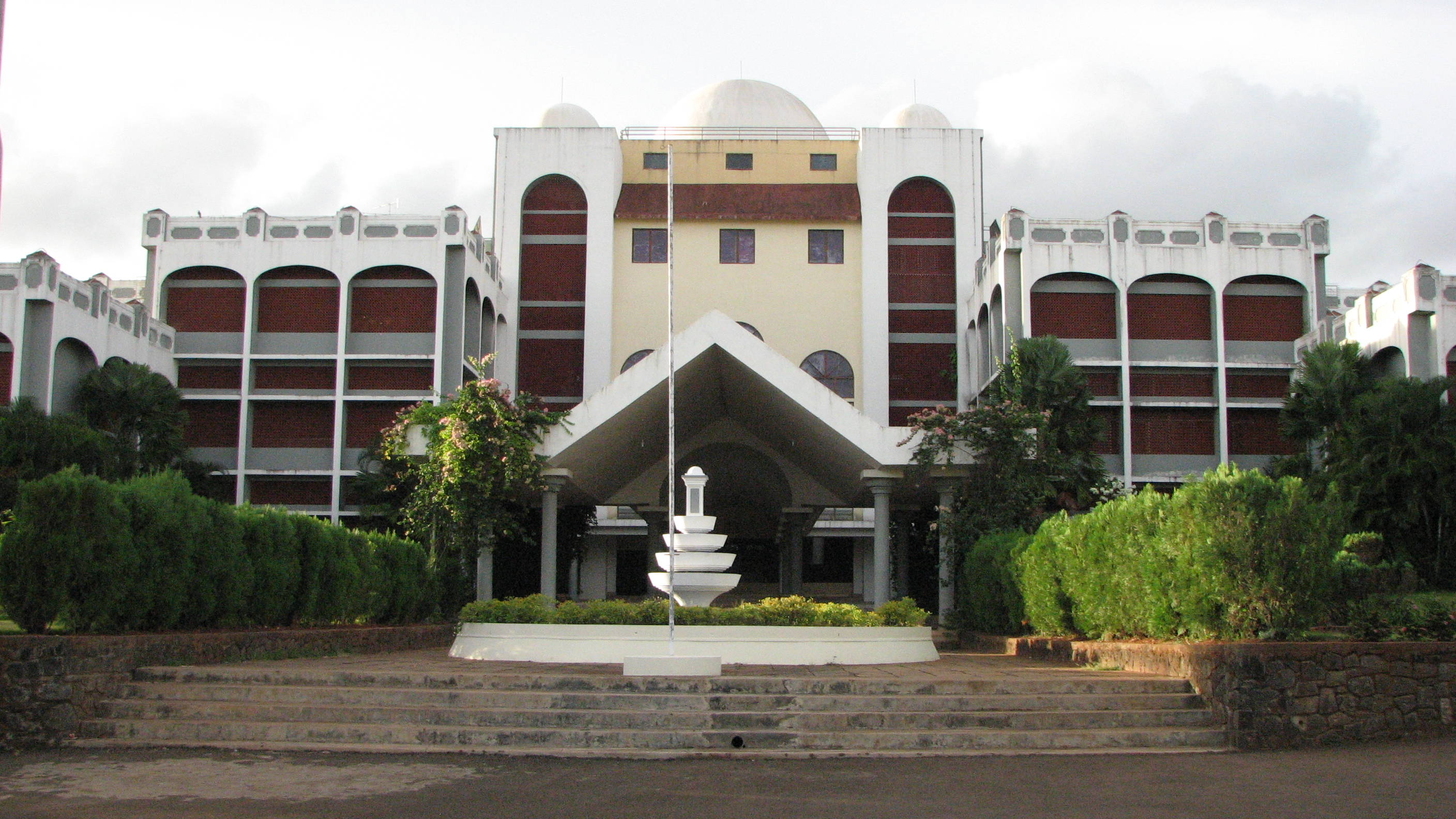
MESCE Kuttippuram, the first self-financing engineering college in Kerala

The Kerala school of astronomy and mathematics flourished between the 14th and 16th centuries. In attempting to solve astronomical problems, the school independently created a number of important mathematics concepts, including series expansion for trigonometric functions. The school was based in Vettathunadu (Tirur region).

The Malappuram district has 1,620 schools, the most in Kerala as per the school statistics of 2019–20. There are 898 lower primary schools, 363 upper primary schools, 355 high schools, 248 higher secondary schools, and 27 vocational higher secondary schools in the district. Besides these, there are 120 CBSE schools and 3 ICSE schools.

554 government schools, 810 aided schools, and 1 unaided school recognised by the Government of Kerala have been digitalised. In the academic year 2019–20, the total number of students studying in the schools recognised by Government of Kerala was 739,966; this was composed of 407,690 in aided schools; 245,445 in government schools; and 86,831 in the recognised unaided schools.

This district plays a significant role in the higher education sector of the state. It is home to two of the main universities in the state: the University of Calicut centered at Tenhipalam, which was established in 1968 as the second university in Kerala, and the Thunchath Ezhuthachan Malayalam University centered at Tirur, which was established in 2012. AMU Malappuram Campus, one of the three off-campus centres of Aligarh Muslim University (AMU), is in Cherukara and was established by the AMU in 2010. An off-campus of the English and Foreign Languages University functions at Panakkad. The district is also home to a subcentre of Kerala Agricultural University at Thavanur, and a subcentre of Sree Sankaracharya University of Sanskrit at Tirunavaya. The headquarters of Darul Huda Islamic University is at Chemmad. INKEL Greens at Malappuram provides an educational zone with the industrial zone. Eranad Knowledge City at Manjeri is a first of its kind project in the state.

=== Palakkad ===
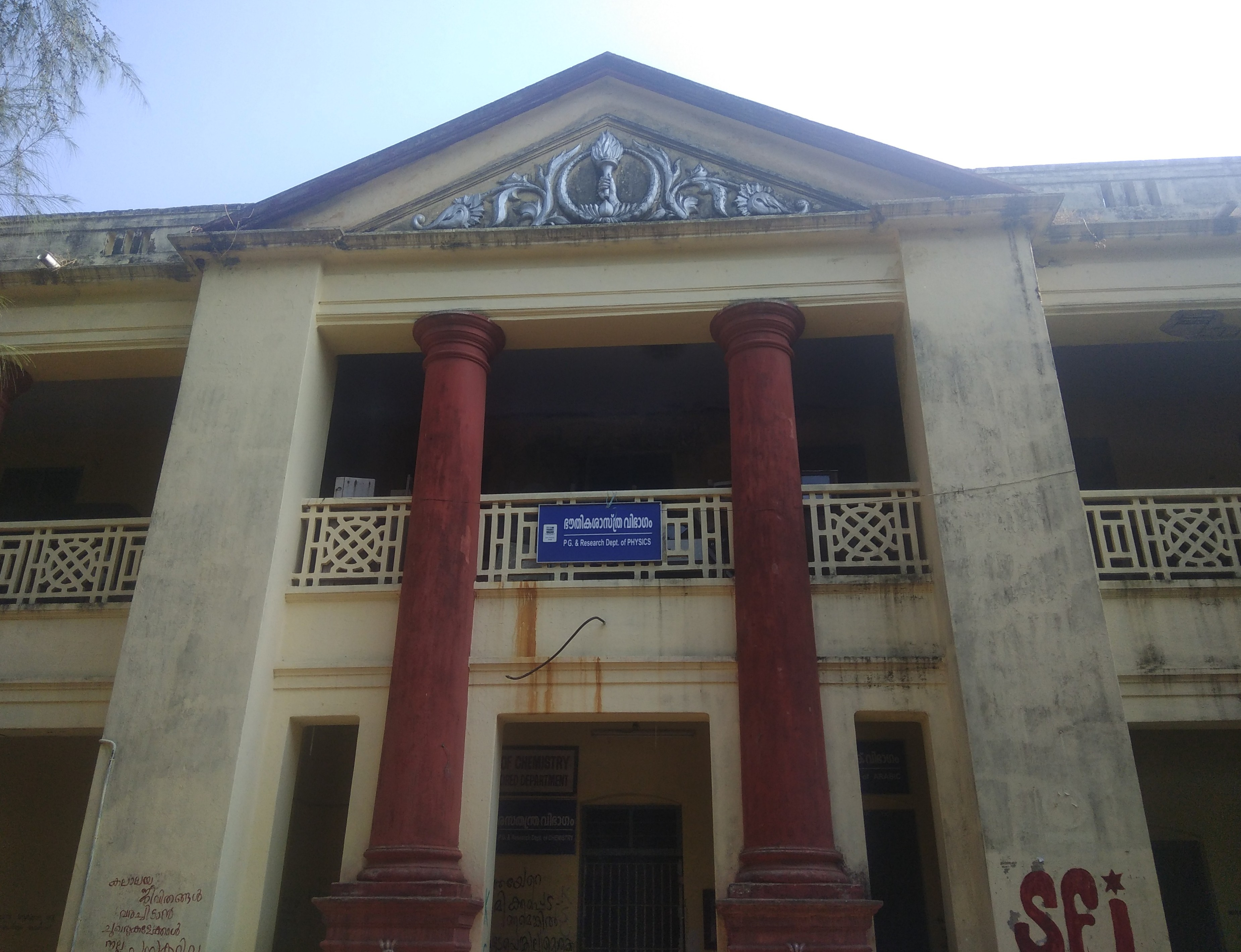
Physics department of Government Victoria College, Palakkad

Palakkad city is home to the only Indian Institute of Technology in Kerala. Government Victoria College, Palakkad, established in 1866, is one of the oldest colleges in the state. Other colleges in the state include the Government Medical College, Palakkad, the NSS College of Engineering and Mercy College, Palakkad, a women's college established in 1964. The Chembai Memorial Government Music College is one of the main centres of excellence in teaching carnatic music in the state.

== Media ==
=== Kozhikode ===
==== Radio ====
The Kozhikode radio station of All India Radio has two transmitters: Kozhikode AM (100 kilowatts) and Kozhikode FM [Vividh Bharathi] (10 kilowatts). Private FM radio stations are Radio Mango 91.9 (operated by Malayala Manorama Co. Ltd.), Radio Mirchi (operated by Entertainment Network India Ltd.), and Club FM 104.8 (operated by Mathrubhumi group and Red FM 93.5 of the SUN Network). AIR FM radio stations are Kozhikode – 103.6 MHz; AIR MW radio station is Kozhikode – 684 kHz.

==== Television ====
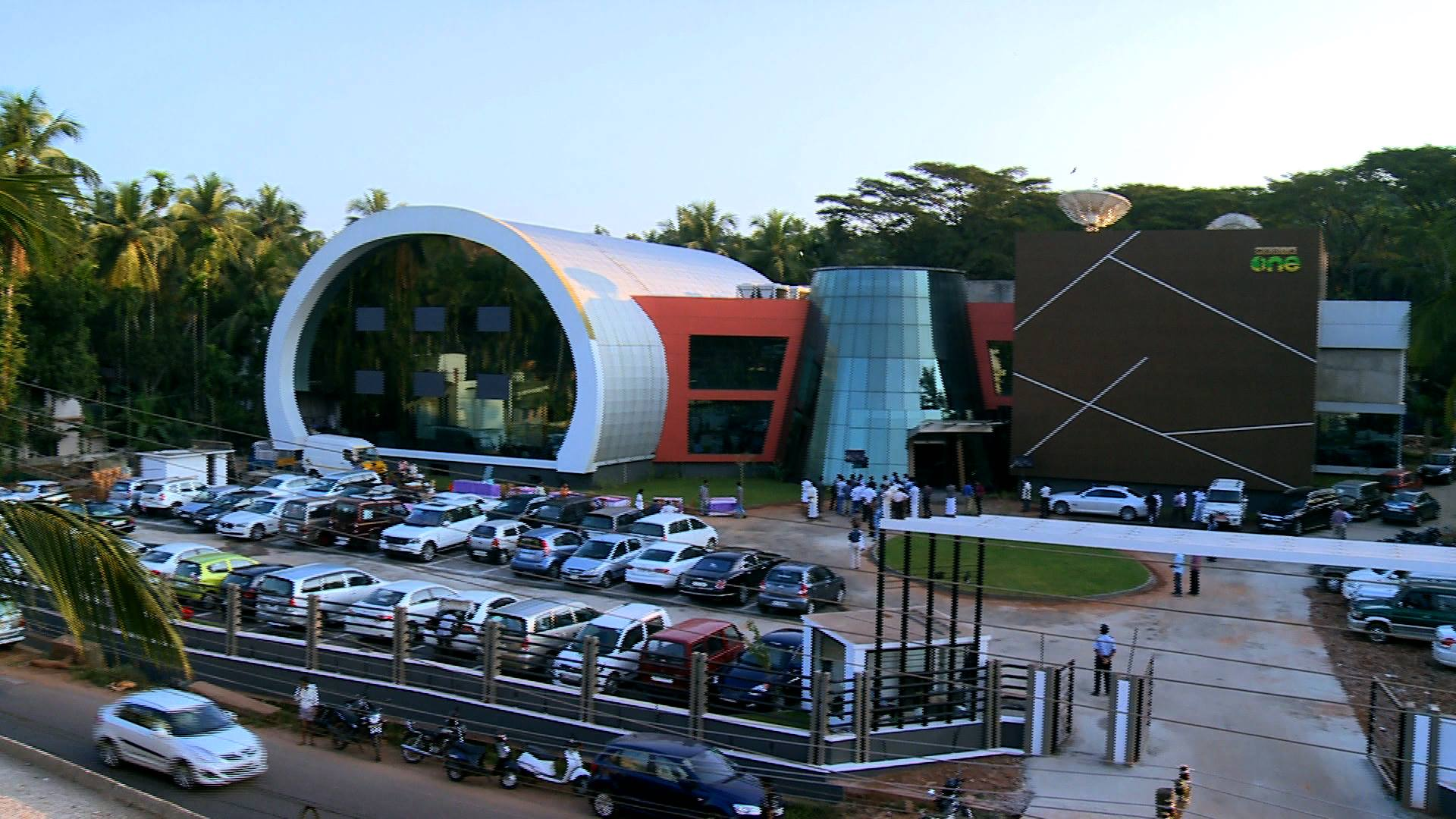
MediaOne TV headquarters and studio

Since 3 July 1984, a television transmitter has relayed programmes from Delhi and Thiruvananthapuram to Kozhikode. Doordarshan has its broadcasting centre in Kozhikode at the Medical College. Malayalam channels based in Kozhikode include Shalom Television, Darshana TV, and Media One TV. All major channels in Malayalam—Manorama News, Asianet, Surya TV, Kairali TV, Amrita TV, Jeevan TV, and Jaihind—have their studios and news bureaus in the city.

Satellite television services are available through DD Direct+, Dish TV, Sun Direct DTH, and Tata Sky. Asianet Digital TV is popularly known as ACV telecasts daily city news. Spidernet is another local channel. Other local operators include KCL and Citinet.

The Calicut Press Club was established in 1970 as the centre of all regional media activities, both print and electronic. Beginning with around 70 members, this Press Club became a prestigious and alert media centre in the state, with a present membership of over 280.

=== Malappuram ===
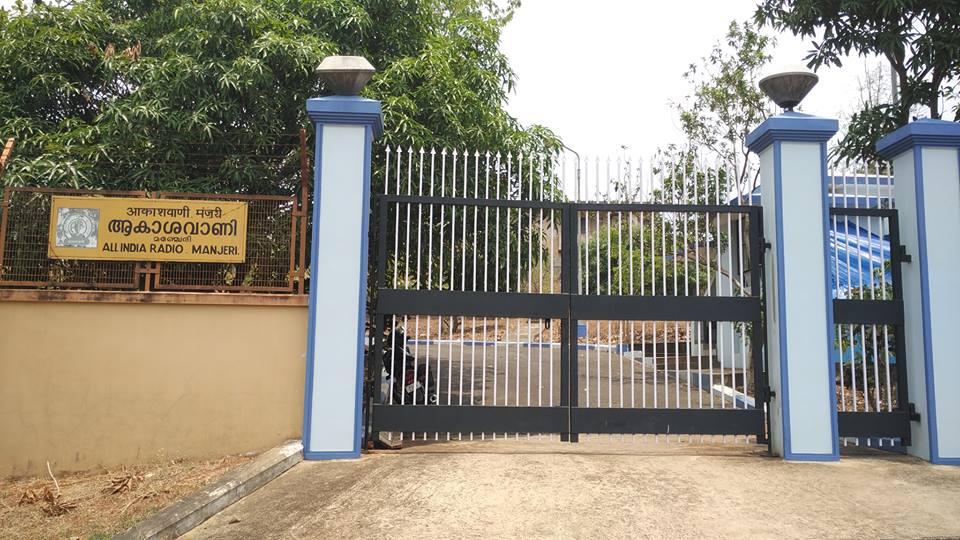
AIR Manjeri FM radio station

The Malayala Manorama, Mathrubhumi, Madhyamam, Chandrika, Deshabhimani, Suprabhaatham, and Siraj daily newspapers have printing centres in and around Malappuram City. The Hindu also has an edition and printing press at Malappuram. A few periodicals—monthlies, fortnightlies, and weeklies, mostly devoted to religion and culture—are also published.

Almost all Malayalam channels and newspapers, as well as the Malappuram Press Club, have their bureau at Up Hill, adjacent to Municipal Town Hall. Doordarshan has two major relay stations in the district: one at Malappuram and one at Manjeri. The government of India's Prasar Bharati National Public Service Broadcaster has an FM station in the district (AIR Manjeri FM), broadcasting on 102.7 Mhz. Despite lacking private FM stations, Malappuram, Ponnani, and Tirur are among the top ten towns with the highest radio listenership in India.

=== Palakkad ===
Major Malayalam newspapers Malayala Manorama, Mathrubhumi, Deshabhimani, Suprabhaatham Daily, and The Hindu have printing centers in city. A few evening newspapers are also published in the city. Local news channels like ACV also function in city. A private FM station operates in Palakkad at Ahalia Campus; there is a long-term demand for setting up a government FM station in Palakkad.

== Culture ==
=== Kozhikode ===
==== Malayalam language ====
Kozhikode district has made significant contributions to Malayalam literature. During the 17th century, His Highness Sri Samoothiri Manavedan Maharaja authored Krishnattam, a manipravala text describing the childhood of Lord Krishna in eight volumes. The district is famous for folk songs or ballads known as Vadakkan Pattukal. The most popular songs celebrate the exploits of Thacholi Othenan and Unniyarcha.

An intellectual debate is held for Vedic scholars, wherein winners receive the title of "Pattathanam". This debate takes place at the Thali Temple during the month of Thulam.

Many prominent writers of Malayalam literature hail from Kozhikode. Among them are S. K. Pottekkatt, Thikkodiyan, Punathil Kunjabdulla, U. A. Khader, Akbar Kakkattil, N. N. Kakkad, P. Valsala, and M. N. Karassery. Pottekkatt was perhaps the most celebrated writer from Kozhikode whose award-winning work Oru Theruvinte Katha is set in S. M. Street. Several leading Malayalam publishing houses are based in the city, including Poorna, Mathrubhumi, Mulberry, Lipi, and Olive. The Kozhikode Public Library and Research Centre at Mananchira was constructed in 1996.

==== Music ====
In addition to the Malabar Mahotsavam, the annual cultural fest of Kozhikode, the Tyagaraja Aradhana Trust has conducted a five-day music festival in honour of Tyagaraja every year since 1981. The festival is complete with the Uncchavritti, rendering of Divyanama Kritis and Pancharatna Kritis, and concerts by professional and student musicians throughout the day.

Kozhikode has a tradition of ghazal and Hindustani music appreciation. There are many Malayalam ghazals. The late film director and singer M. S. Baburaj, from Kozhikode, was influenced by ghazal and Hindustani music traditions.

Hindi songs are popular in this city. The Mohammed Rafi Foundation organises musical events on the anniversaries of the birth (on 24 December) and death of legendary singer Mohammed Rafi. These events are estimated to be the largest such "Rafi Nite" gatherings anywhere in India.

==== Films ====
The film history of Kozhikode dates back to the 1950s. Some of the main production companies of Malayalam films—like Grihalakshmi productions, Kalpaka, and Swargachithra—are Kozhikode based companies. The city was also an important centre for filmmakers like I. V. Sasi and T. Damodaran. Kozhikode produced such notable actors as Ummer, Mammukoya, Balan K. Nair, Santha Devi, and Kuthiravattam Pappu. The composer M. S. Baburaj, lyricist and screenwriter Gireesh Puthenchery, directors Ranjith, V. M. Vinu, A. Vincent, Shajoon Kariyal, Anjali Menon, and cinematographer P. S. Nivas also hail from Kozhikode. Also from Kozhikode include the actors Neeraj Madhav, Madhupal, Anoop Menon, Nellikode Bhaskaran, Augustine, and Vijayan Malaparamba.

The 1947 Douglas Fairbanks Jr. Hollywood thriller, Sinbad the Sailor, mentions Kozhikode.

As the largest city in the Malabar region, Kozhikode also has a vital role in the entertainment segment. The city's first theatre, Calicut Crown, was opened as early as 1925. The city has more than 10 theatres and two multiplexes, the PVS Film City (the first multiplex in Malabar), and the Crown Theatre.

==== Sports ====
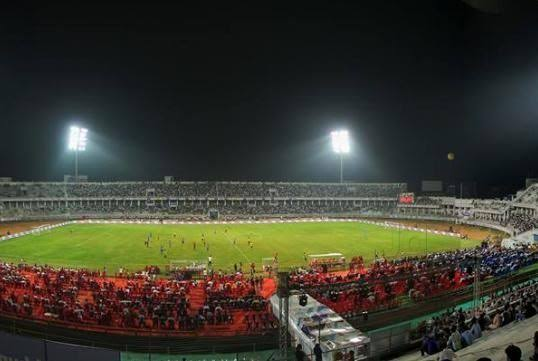
EMS Stadium

Kozhikode is known as the "second Mecca" of football, after Kolkata. The EMS Stadium has hosted many international football matches of major football teams. The city is home to international footballers such as T. Abdul Rahman (who played for the nation in many international games, including the 1956 Melbourne Olympic Games), K.P. Sethu Madhavan, Premnath Phillips, Muhamad Najeeb, M. Prasannan, and Sudheer. The seven-a-side form of football is famous in the city.

Other popular games in Kozhikode include cricket, basketball, badminton, and volleyball.

P. T. Usha is a famous Kozhikode athlete who is regarded as one of the greatest athletes India has ever produced; she is often called the "queen of Indian track and field". Currently, she runs the Usha School of Athletics at Koyilandy in Kerala. Other sports personalities include Jimmy George, Tom Joseph, and Premnath Phillips. Jaseel P. Ismail, V. Diju, Aparna Balan, and Arun Vishnu are international badminton players from the city.

The Sports & Education Promotion Trust (SEPT) was established to promote sports development in India, with a focus on football. Started in 2004 and based in Kozhikode, the trust has set up 52 centres called "football nurseries" spread across thirteen districts in Kerala.

Since 2010, the Calicut Mini Marathon has been organised by IIM Kozhikode, with a participation of around 7,000 people every year.

=== Malappuram ===
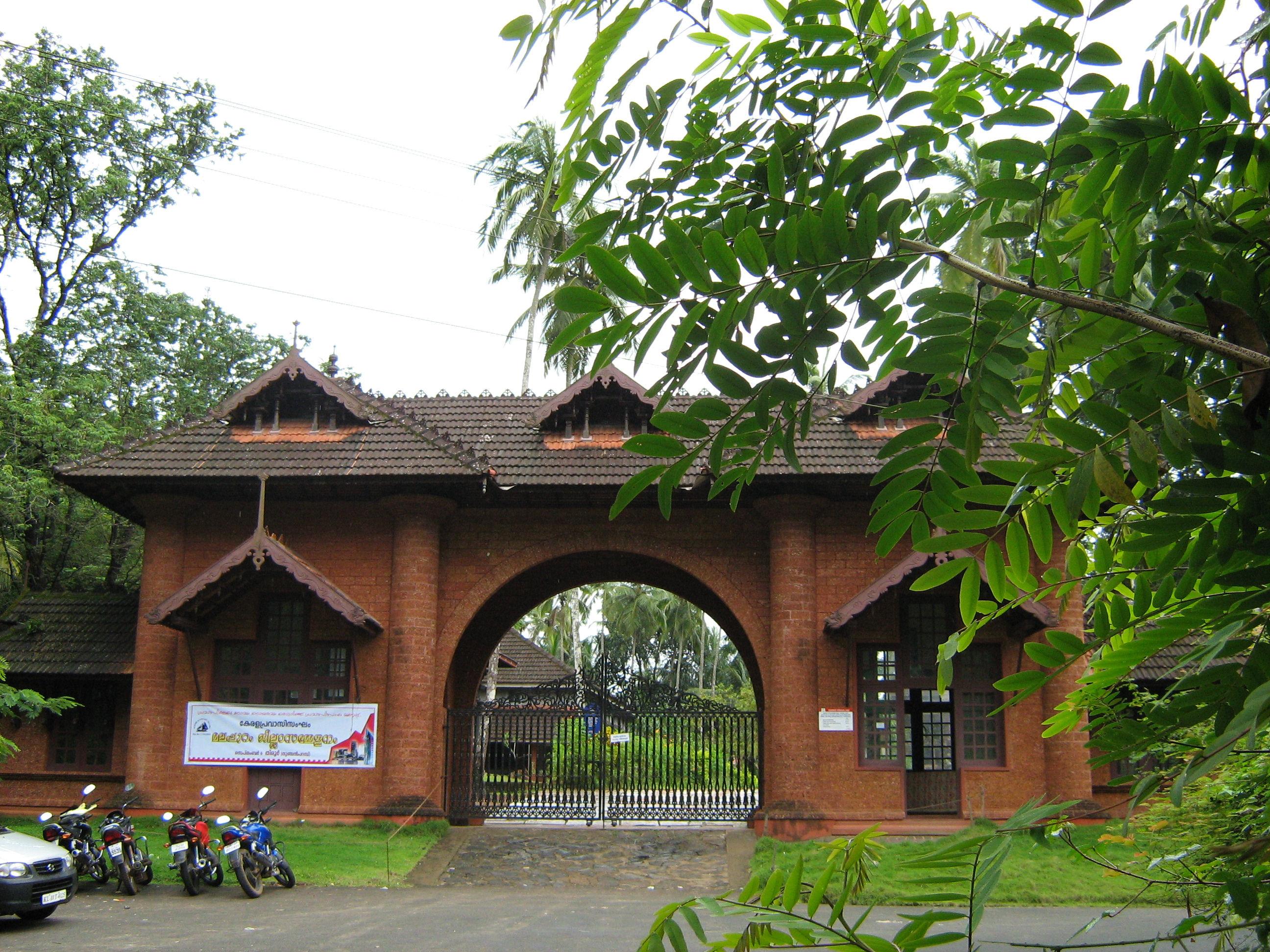
Thunchan Smarakam at Tirur, in memory of Thunchaththu Ezhuthachan

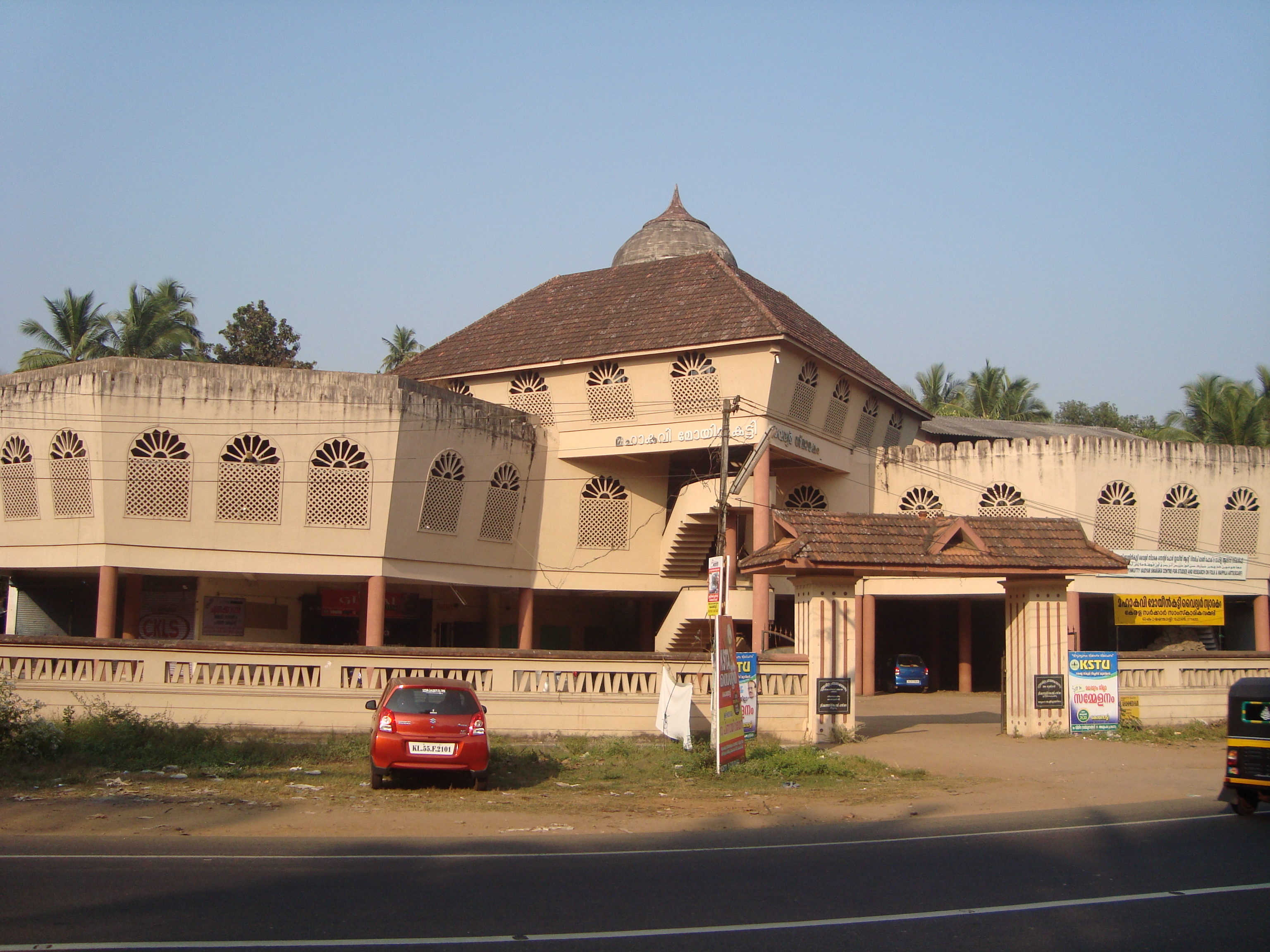
Maha Kavi Moyinkutty Vaidyar Smarakam at Kondotty

The Malayalam alphabet was first adopted by Thunchath Ezhuthachan, who was born at Tirur and is known as the father of the modern Malayalam language. Tirur is the headquarters of the Malayalam Research Centre. The Mappila paattu poet Moyinkutty Vaidyar was born at Kondotty. He is considered as one of the Mahakavis (a title for 'great poet') of Mappila songs.

Additional renowned writers of Malayalam include Achyutha Pisharadi, Alamkode Leelakrishnan, Edasseri Govindan Nair, K. P. Ramanunni, Kuttikrishna Marar, Kuttippuram Kesavan Nair, Melpathur Narayana Bhattathiri, N. Damodaran, Nandanar, Poonthanam Nambudiri, Pulikkottil Hyder, Uroob, V. C. Balakrishna Panicker, Vallathol Gopala Menon, and Vallathol Narayana Menon, all of whom were natives of the district. Writers M. Govindan, M. T. Vasudevan Nair, and Akkitham Achuthan Namboothiri hailed from Ponnani Kalari based at Ponnani. Nalapat Narayana Menon, Balamani Amma, V. T. Bhattathiripad, and Kamala Surayya also hail from the erstwhile Ponnani Taluk.

Malappuram was the main centre of Mappila Paattu literature in the state. Mappila Paattu poets such as the aforementioned Moyinkutty Vaidyar and Pulikkottil Hyder, as well as Kulangara Veettil Moidu Musliyar (popularly known as Chakkeeri Shujayi), Chakkeeri Moideenkutty, Manakkarakath Kunhikoya, Nallalam Beeran, K. K. Muhammad Abdul Kareem, Balakrishnan Vallikunnu, Punnayurkulam Bapu, and Veliyankode Umar Qasi, chose to work from Malappuram.

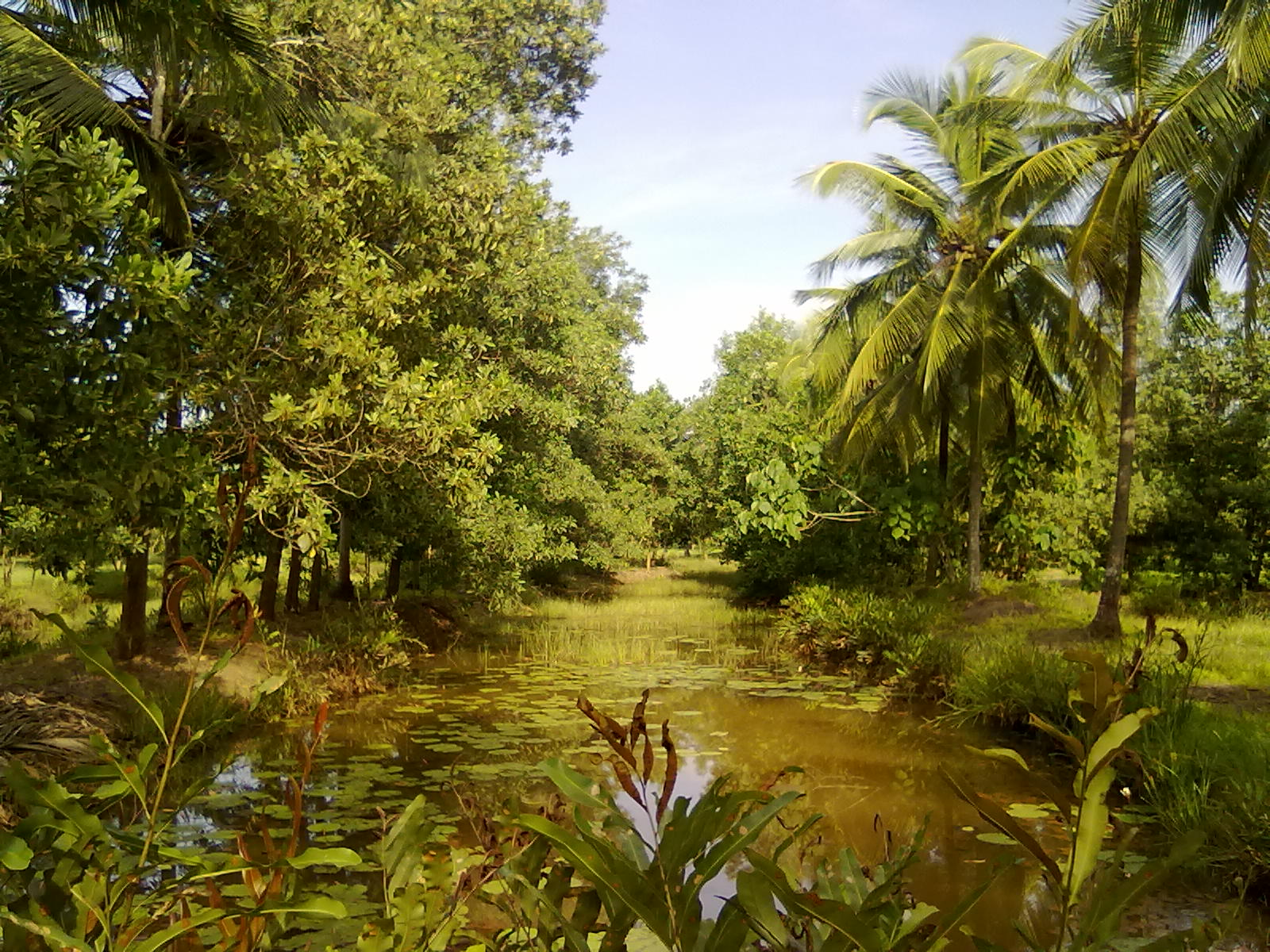
Countryside near Tirur

The district has also contributed to Kathakali, the classical dance form of Kerala. The Veṭṭathunāṭu rulers, who controlled parts of present-day Tirurangadi, Tirur, and Ponnani Taluks, were noted patrons of arts and learning. A Veṭṭathunāṭu Raja (r. 1630–1640) is said to have introduced innovations in Kathakali, which has come to be known as the "Veṭṭathu Tradition". Thunchath Ezhuthachchan and Vallathol Narayana Menon hail from Vettathunad, the latter of whom is considered the resurrector of modern Kathakali through the establishment of the Kerala Kalamandalam school. Kathakali trainer Vazhenkada Kunchu Nair and Kathakali singers Sankaran Embranthiri and Tirur Nambissan were also from Malappuram. Kalamandalam Kalyanikutty Amma, who played a major role in resurrecting Mohiniyattam in the modern Kerala, hailed from Tirunavaya. Mrinalini Sarabhai, an Indian classical dancer, hailed from erstwhile Ponnani Taluk. Kottakkal Chandrasekharan, Kottakkal Sivaraman, and Kottakkal Madhu are famous Kathakali artists hailing from the group Kottakkal Natya Sangam, established by Vaidyaratnam P. S. Warrier in Kottakkal.

The district has also contributed to traditional ayurveda medicine. Arya Vaidya Sala at Kottakkal is one of the largest ayurvedic medicinal networks in the world.

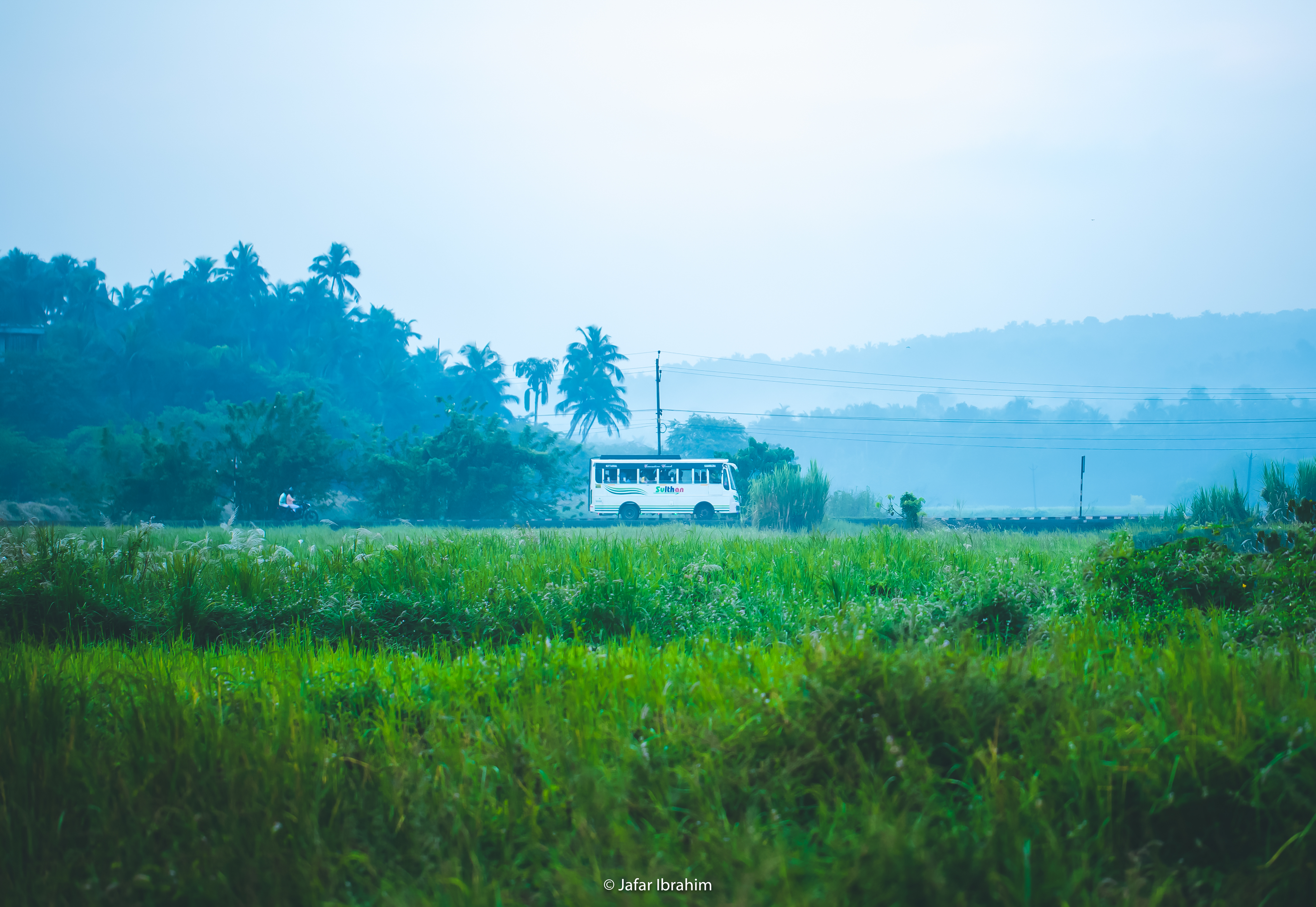
Kottakkal, the centre of the Arya Vaidya Sala

Kerala Varma Valiya Koyi Thampuran (poet), Raja Raja Varma (poet), and Raja Ravi Varma (painter) were from different branches of the Parappanad Royal Family from Parappanangadi. According to some scholars, the ancestors of Velu Thampi Dalawa also belong to Vallikkunnu near Parappanangadi. The Chief Editor of The Hindu (1898–1905) and Founder Chief Editor of The Indian Patriot, Divan Bahadur C. Karunakara Menon (1863–1922), was also from Parappanangadi. O. Chandu Menon wrote his novels Indulekha (the first major novel written in Malayalam) and Saradha while he was the judge at Parappanangadi Munciff Court. K. Madhavan Nair, the founder of Mathrubhumi Daily, comes from Malappuram.

The Ponnani region was the working platform of freedom fighters such as K. Kelappan (popularly known as "Kerala Gandhi"), A. V. Kuttimalu Amma, and Mohammed Abdur Rahiman. Other independence activists from Ponnani Taluk included Lakshmi Sehgal, V. T. Bhattathiripad, and Ammu Swaminathan. The ashes of Mahatma Gandhi, Jawaharlal Nehru, and Lal Bahadur Shastri, were deposited in Kerala at Tirunavaya, on the bank of the river Bharathappuzha. K. Madhavanar, who translated Gandhi's autobiography into Malayalam, was also a native of Malappuram.

Ponnani's trade relations with foreign countries since ancient times paved the way for a cultural exchange. Persian–Arab art forms and North Indian culture came to Ponnani via this trade. This was also the origin of the hybrid language Arabi Malayalam, which has been used in the composition of some regional poetry. The language's script (also known as Ponnani script) was created during the late 16th century and early 17th century. The script was widely used in the district during the last centuries. Hindustani qawwali and ghazals, which came here as part of the cultural exchange, still thrive in Ponnani. EK Aboobacker, Main, and Khalil Bhai (Khalil Rahman) are some of the famous qawwali singers of Ponnani.

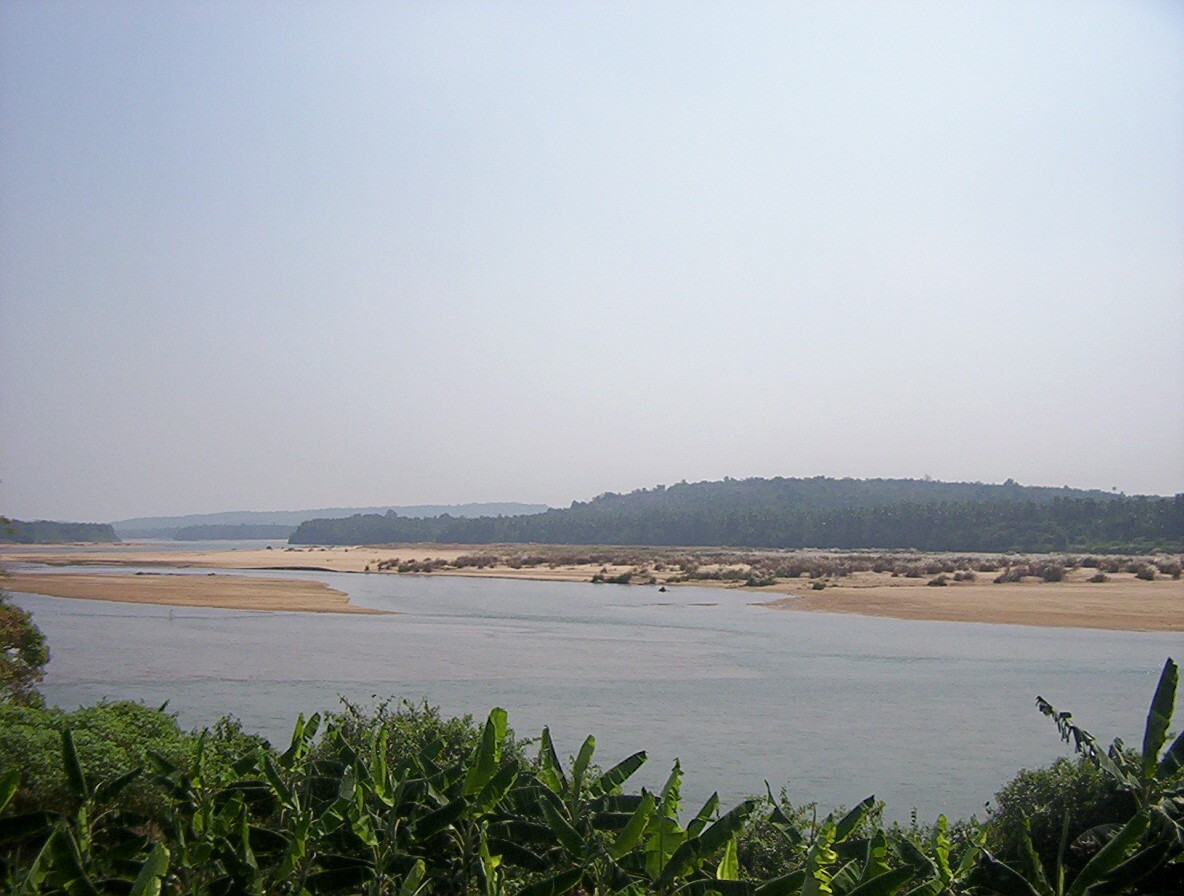
Tirunavaya, the seat of the medieval Mamankam festival

The original headquarters of the Palakkad Rajas were at Athavanad. Several aristocratic Nambudiri Manas are present in the Tirur, Perinthalmanna, and Ponnani taluks. Tirunavaya, the seat of the medieval Mamankam festival, is also present in the district. E. M. S. Namboodiripad, the first Chief Minister of Kerala, hails from Perinthalmanna in the district.

During the medieval period, the district was a centre of Vedic and Islamic studies. The Valiya Juma Masjid at Ponnani was one of the largest centres of Islamic studies in Asia during the medieval period. It is believed that Malik Dinar visited Ponnani. Parameshvara, Nilakantha Somayaji, Jyeṣṭhadeva, Achyutha Pisharadi, and Melpathur Narayana Bhattathiri, who were the main members of the Kerala school of astronomy and mathematics, hailed from the Tirur region. Zainuddin Makhdoom II, a judge and the first known Keralite historian, also hails from the district.

Playwrights and actors from the district include K. T. Muhammed, Nilambur Balan, Nilambur Ayisha, Adil Ibrahim, Aneesh G. Menon, Aparna Nair, Baby Anikha, Dhanish Karthik, Hemanth Menon, Rashin Rahman, Ravi Vallathol, Sangita Madhavan Nair, Shwetha Menon, and Sooraj Thelakkad. Sukumaran—who is also the father of two notable actors and playback singers of Malayalam film industry, namely Prithviraj Sukumaran and Indrajith Sukumaran—also was a native of the district. Other playback singers from the district include Krishnachandran, Parvathy Jayadevan, Shahabaz Aman, Sithara Krishnakumar, Sudeep Palanad, and Unni Menon. The district has also produced some notable film producers, lyricists, cinematographers, and directors including Aryadan Shoukath, Deepu Pradeep, Hari Nair, Iqbal Kuttippuram, Mankada Ravi Varma, Muhammad Musthafa, Muhsin Parari, Rajeev Nair, Salam Bappu, Shanavas K Bavakutty, Shanavas Naranippuzha, T. A. Razzaq, T. A. Shahid, Vinay Govind, and Zakariya Mohammed. Most notable painters from district include Artist Namboothiri, K. C. S. Paniker, Akkitham Narayanan, and T. K. Padmini. M. G. S. Narayanan, one among the most notable historians of Kerala, also hail from here. Social reformers from the district include Veliyankode Umar Khasi, Chalilakath Kunahmed Haji, E. Moidu Moulavi, and Sayyid Sanaullah Makti Tangal.

==== Sports ====
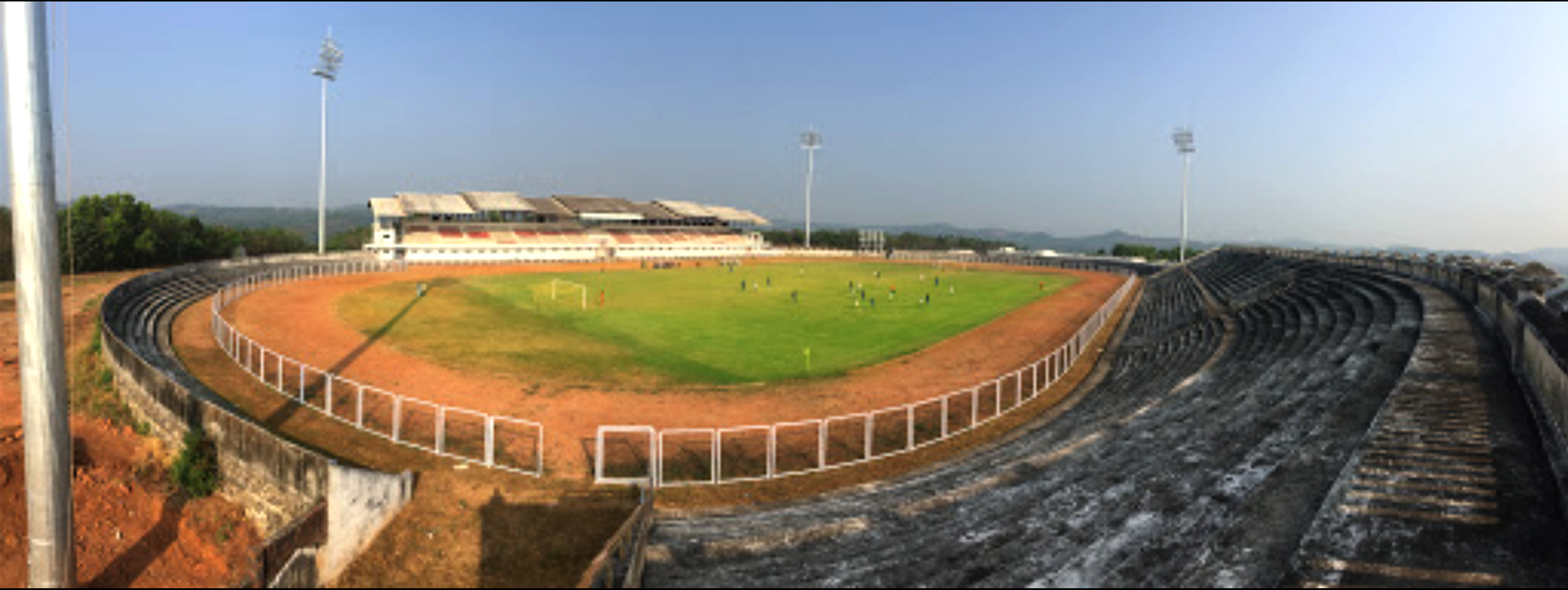
MDSC Stadium

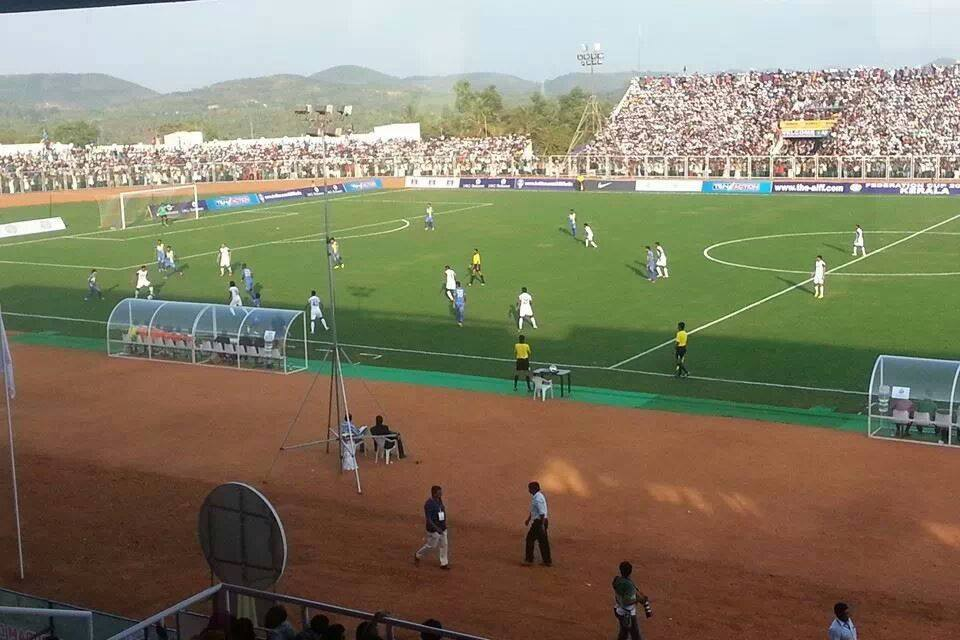
MDSC Stadium during the 2013–14 Indian Federation Cup

Malappuram is often known as "The Mecca of Kerala Football", and is home to the Malappuram District Sports Complex & Football Academy and Kottappadi Football Stadium complexes. MDSC Stadium was selected as one of two stadiums, along with the Jawaharlal Nehru Stadium, to host the group stages of the 2013–14 Indian Federation Cup. Other major stadiums include the Rajiv Gandhi Municipal Stadium at Tirur, and the Perinthalmanna Cricket Stadium at Perinthalmanna.

Malabar Premier League was initiated in 2015 to strengthen football in the district. The Calicut University Synthetic Track at Tenhipalam is the apex synthetic track in the district, and is associated with the C. H. Muhammad Koya Stadium. Other major stadiums include those at Areekode, Kottakkal, and Ponnani. A football hub to internationalise the eight major football stadiums of district is proposed. Two new stadium complexes in Tanur and Nilambur are under construction.

=== Palakkad ===
Palakkad district has produced several notable poets, playback singers, and actors. The Thrithala–Pattambi region can be described as the cultural capital of the district.

==== Sports ====
The Indira Gandhi Municipal Stadium in the center of Palakkad city, once used for major sport events, has fallen into disrepair due to the lack of maintenance; however, the municipality has proposed a renovation of the stadium with international facilities. Fort Maidan, a multi-use stadium in Palakkad, is mainly used for cricket matches. In 2003, the Ranji Trophy was introduced in Fort Maidan. The city has an indoor stadium located near Government Victoria College, Palakkad, with an eight-lane synthetic track.

== Malabar cuisine ==
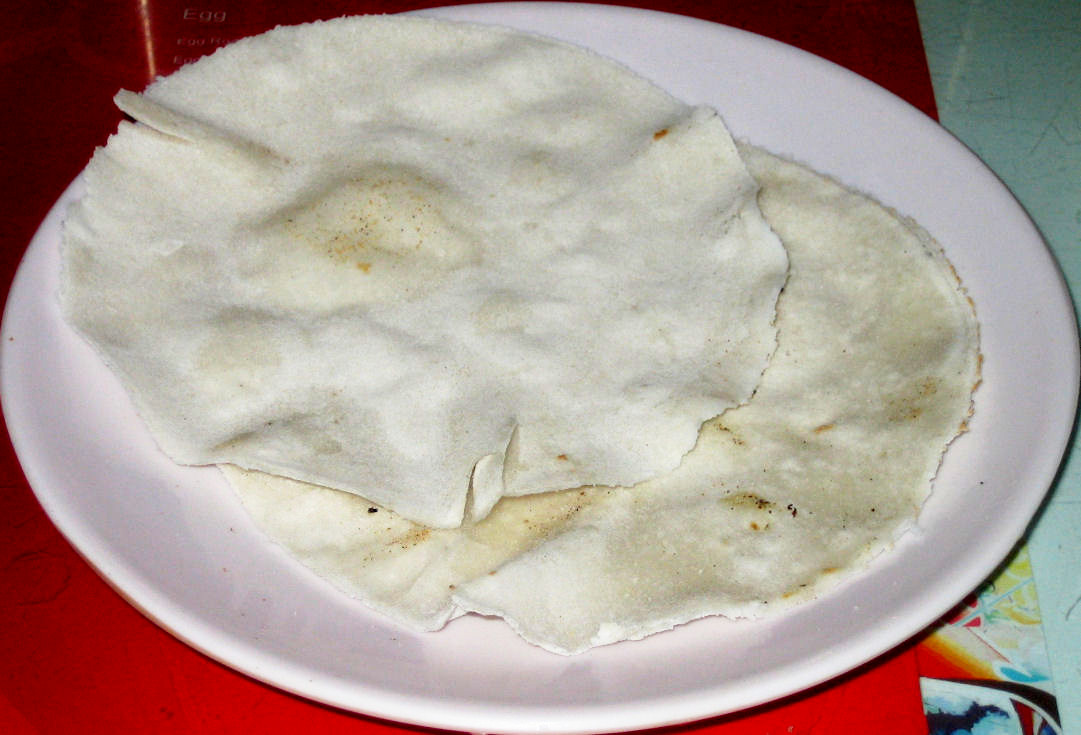
Pathiri, a pancake made of rice flour

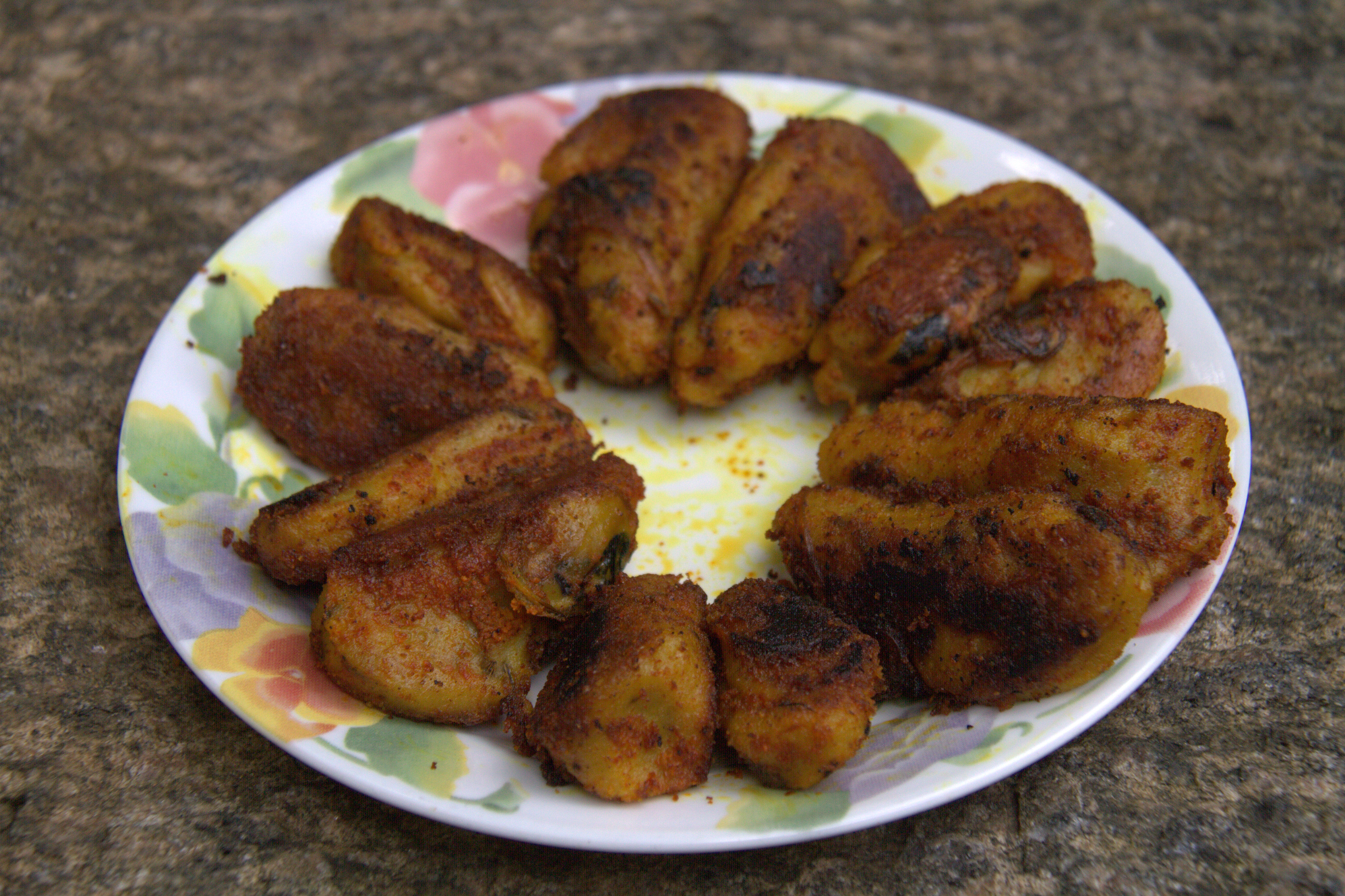
Kallummakkaya nirachathu or arikkadukka (mussels stuffed with rice)

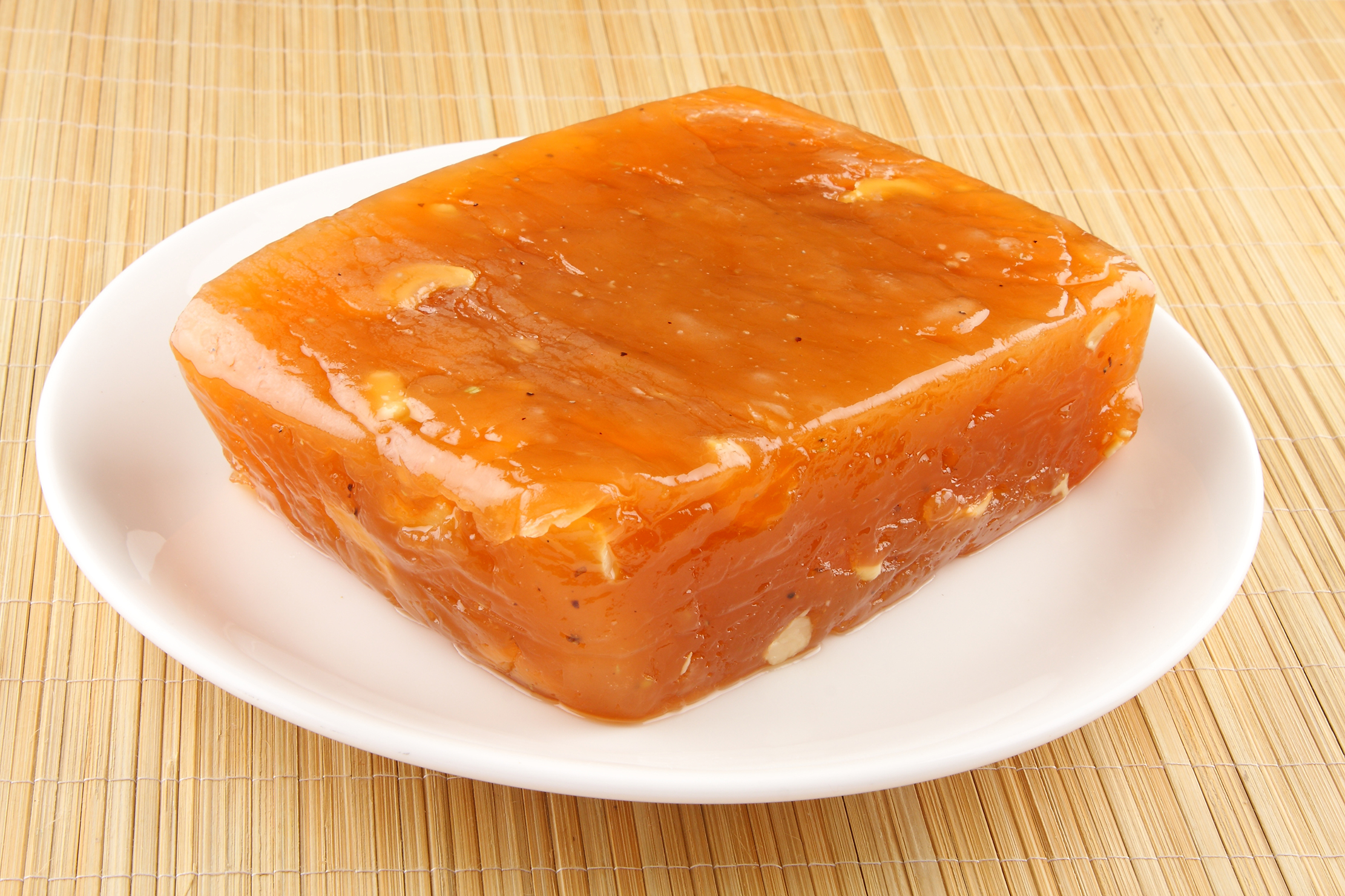
Halwas are popular in Kozhikode and Ponnani

Centuries of maritime trade has given South Malabar a cosmopolitan cuisine that combines traditional Kerala, Persian, Yemenese, and Arab food culture, and offers a variety of both vegetarian and non-vegetarian dishes. Pathiri, a type of rice flour pancake, is a primary food throughout South Malabar, and a common breakfast item. Variants of pathiri include neypathiri (made with ghee), poricha pathiri (fried rather than baked), meen pathiri (stuffed with fish), and irachi pathiri (stuffed with beef). Kallummakkaya (mussels) curry, irachi puttu (irachi meaning "meat"), parottas (soft flatbread), and ghee rice are some other specialties. Spices are a hallmark of South Malabar cuisine—black pepper, cardamom, and clove are used profusely. Vegetarian fare includes Sadya, a traditional meal served on a banana leaf.

The Malabar version of biryani (Malayalam: kuzhi mandi) is another popular item, which has influences from Yemen. Various varieties of biriyanis like Kozhikode biriyani and Ponnani biriyani are prepared in South Malabar.

Another specialty is banana chips, which are made crisp and wafer-thin. Other popular dishes are prepared using seafood such as prawns, mussels, and mackerel. Snacks include unnakkaya (deep-fried, boiled ripe banana paste covering a mixture of cashew, raisins, and sugar), pazham nirachathu (ripe banana filled with coconut grating, molasses, or sugar), muttamala made of eggs, chatti pathiri (a dessert made of flour, like a baked, layered chapati with rich filling), arikkadukka, and more. Many of these snacks have their own style in the Ponnani area.

Kozhikode is also famous for haluva, called "sweet meat" by Europeans due to the texture of the sweet. A main road in Kozhikode is named "Mittai Theruvu" ("Sweet Meat Street"), so named for the numerous halwa stores which used to dot it.

However, newer generations are more inclined towards Chinese and American food. Chinese food is very popular among the locals.

== Tourism ==
=== Kozhikode ===
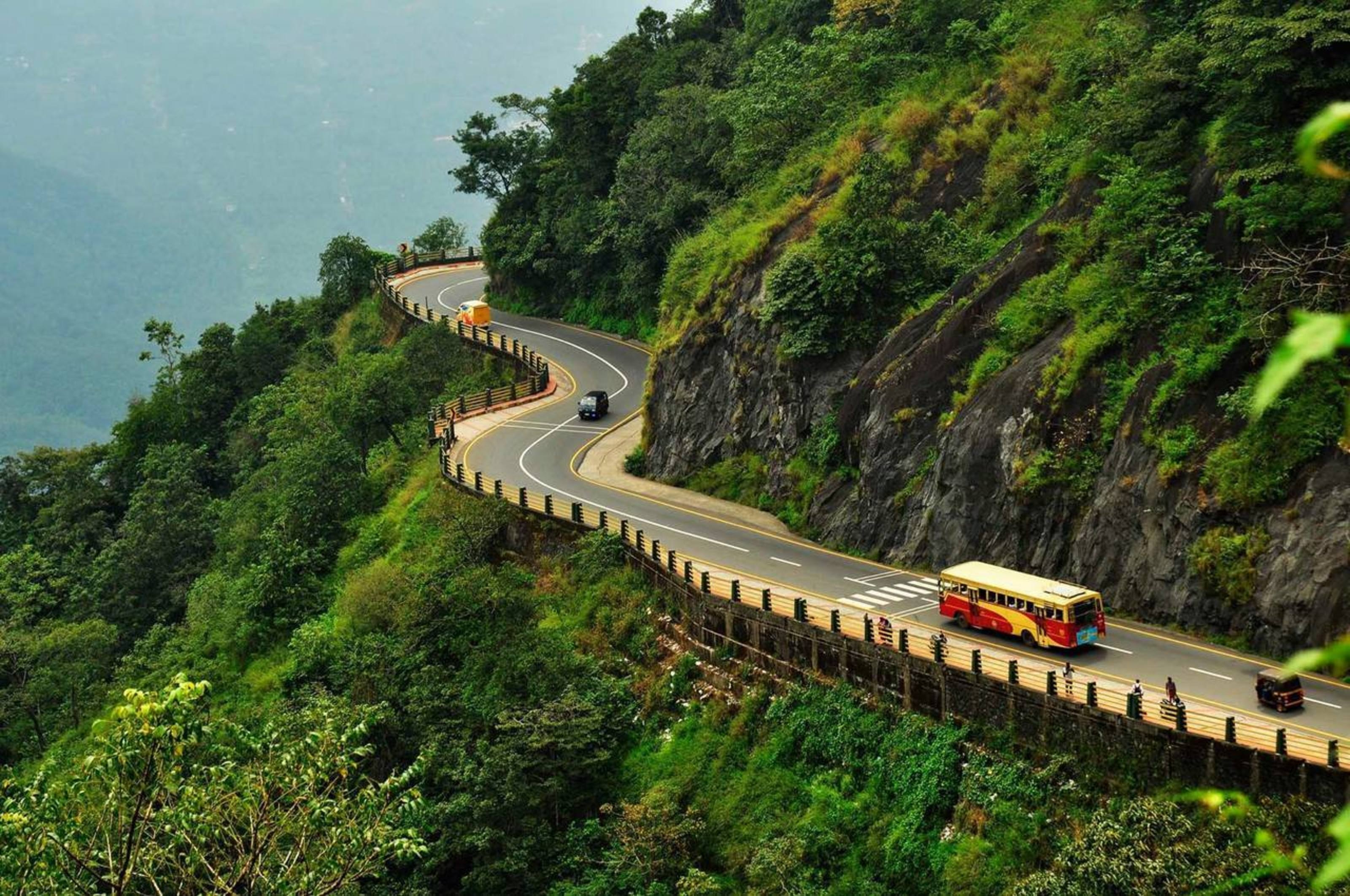
Thamarassery Churam, a tourist destination in Kozhikode

- Kozhikode Beach
- Mananchira – man-made freshwater pond park in the city centre
- S. M. Street (Mittayitheruvu) a famous shopping street and pedestrian zone
- Kakkayam Valley – dam site located at Koorachundu in Kozhikode, on the outskirts of the Western Ghats and Malabar Wildlife Sanctuary, home to wild animals including elephants and bison
- Sarovaram Bio Park – eco-friendly development near Kottooly, located in an ecosystem consisting of wetlands and mangrove forests containing bird habitat
- Planetarium
- Mishkal Mosque – one of the few surviving medieval mosques in Kerala, and regarded as an important cultural, historical, and architectural monument
- Kappad Beach – beach and village near Koyilandy where Vasco da Gama landed
- Thusharagiri Falls
- Chaliyam harbour – village on an island in the estuary of Chaliyar (River Beypore), bounded by the Conolly Canal in the east
- Kakkadampoyil – small village that has recently emerged as a major tourist destination in the district
- Aripara Falls
- Thamarassery Churam – mountain pass in Kerala; part of the National Highway 766
- Beypore – ancient port town with a beach and floating bridge
- Urumi Dam – small diversion dam constructed across Poyilingalpuzha
- Vayalada – hilly area home to Wayalada view point
- Tali Shiva Temple – 14th-century Hindu temple dedicated to Shiva built by the Zamorin
- Chaliyar River – fourth-longest river in Kerala
- Iruvazhanjippuzha – major tributary of Chaliyar River
- Kadalundi – coastal village famous for its bird sanctuary
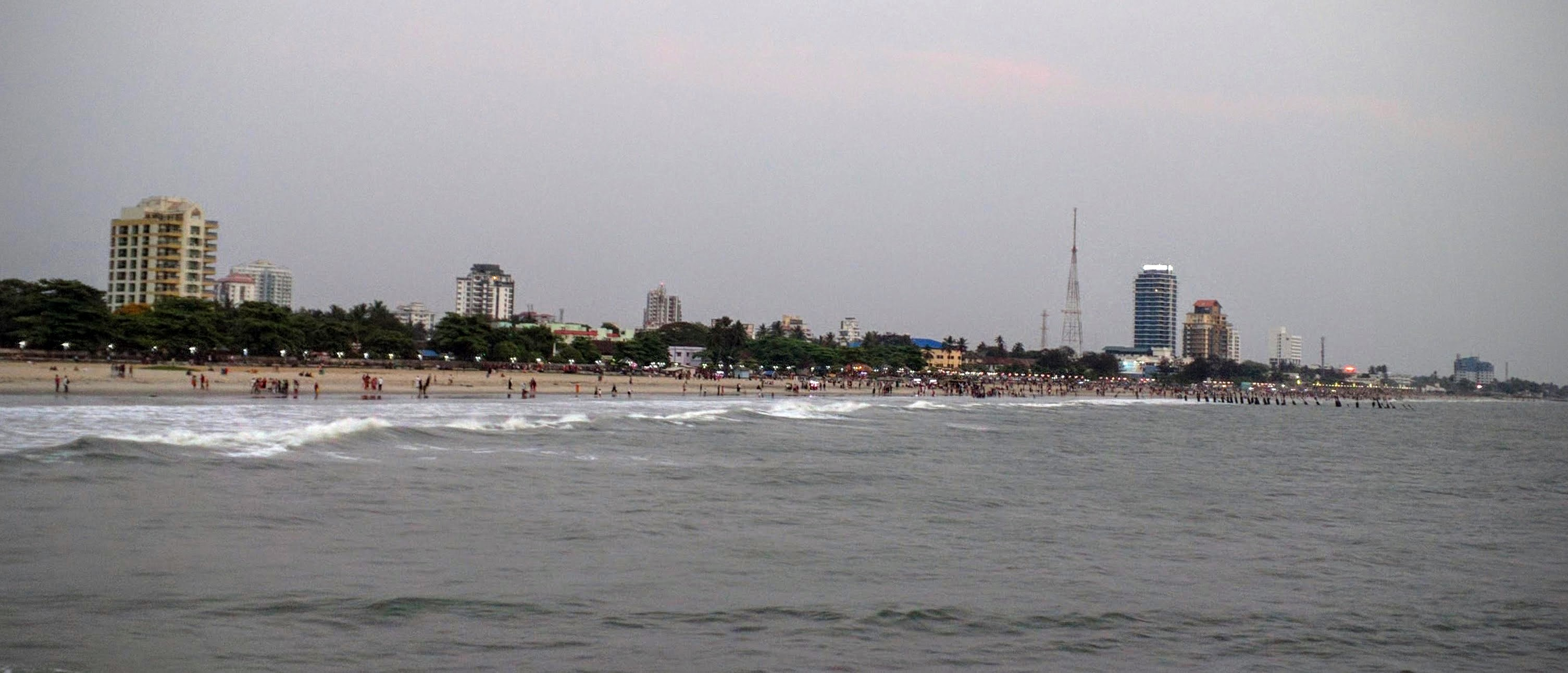
Kozhikode Beach

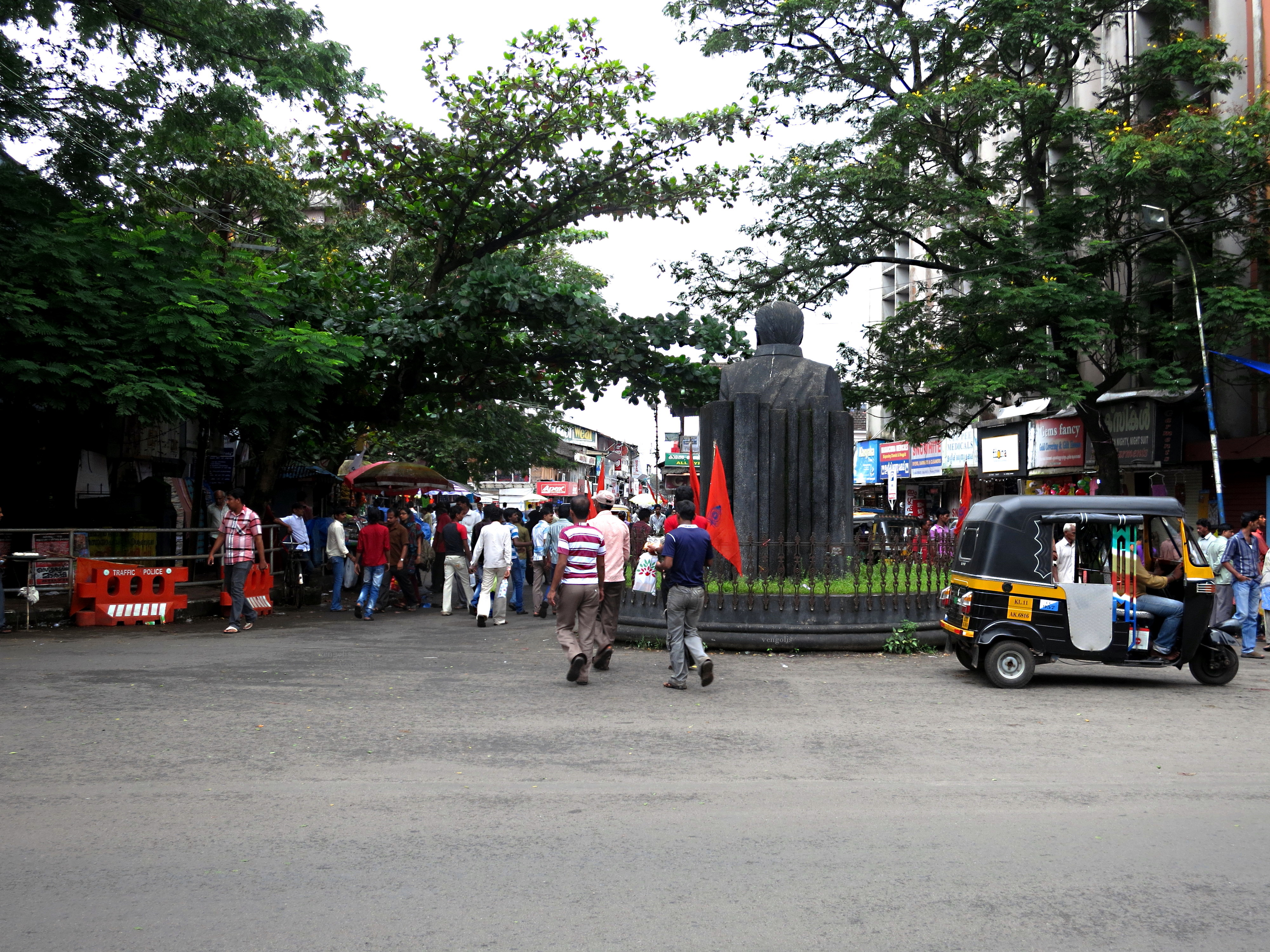
S. M. Street

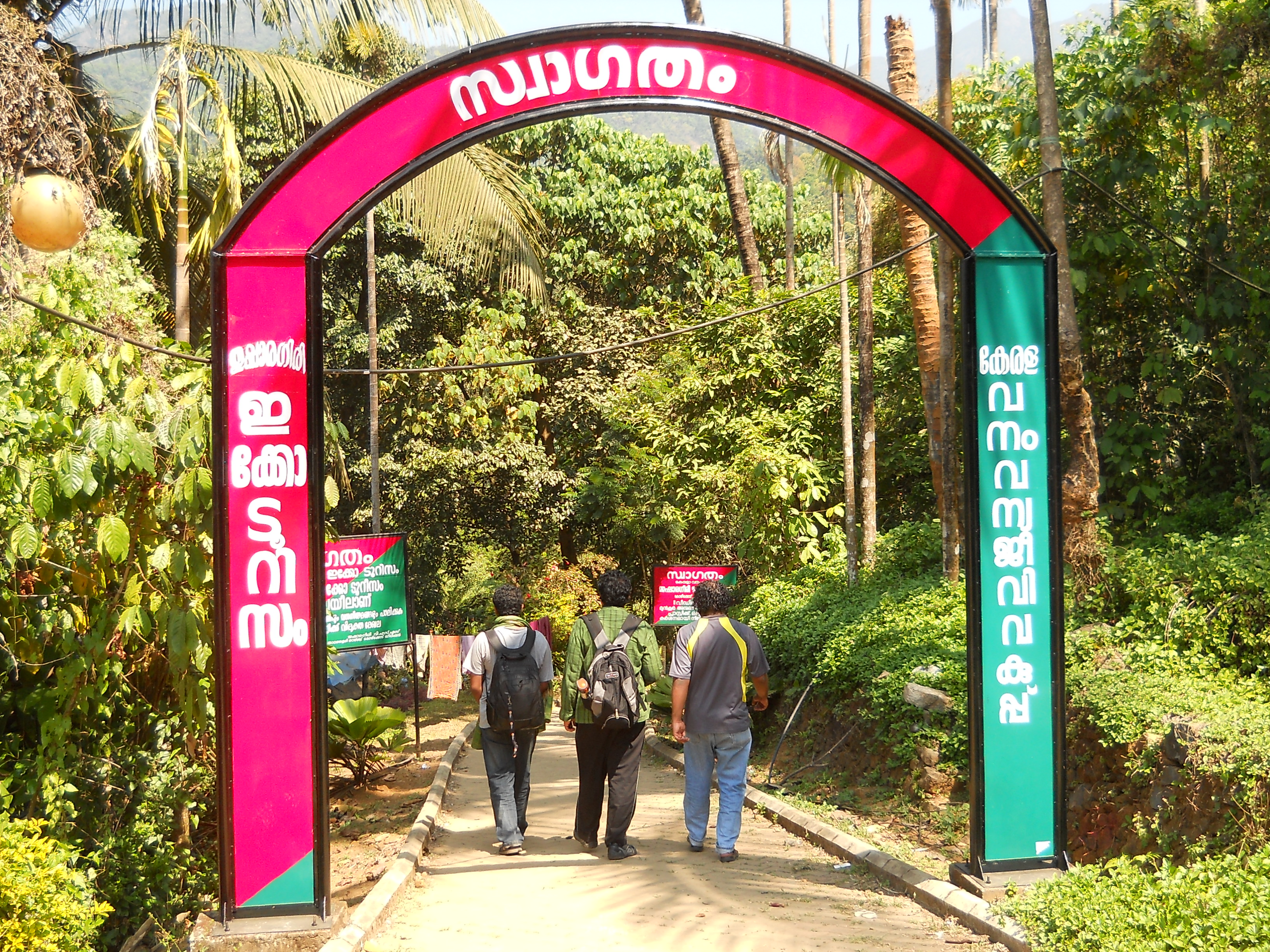
Thusharagiri

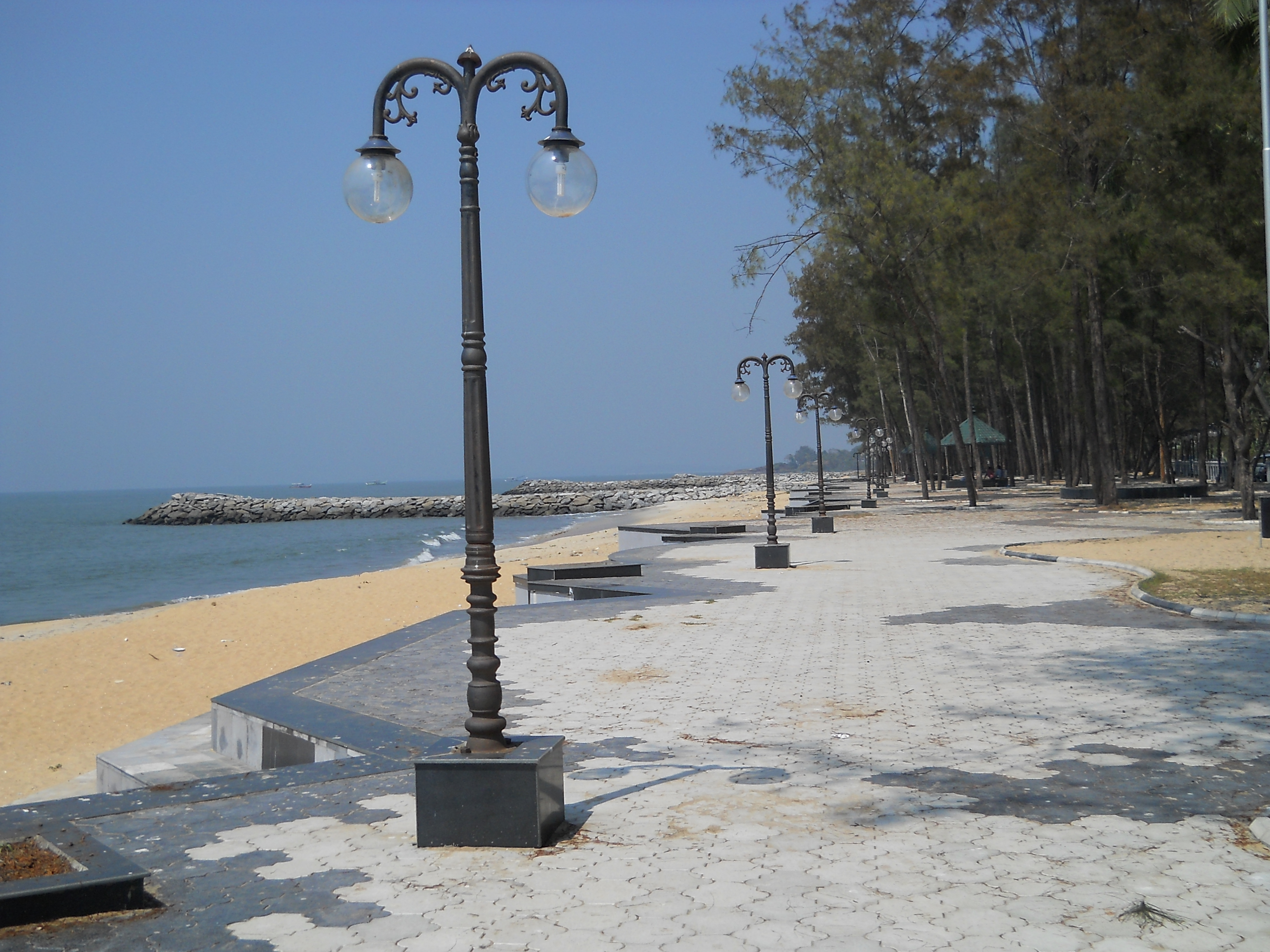
Kappad Beach

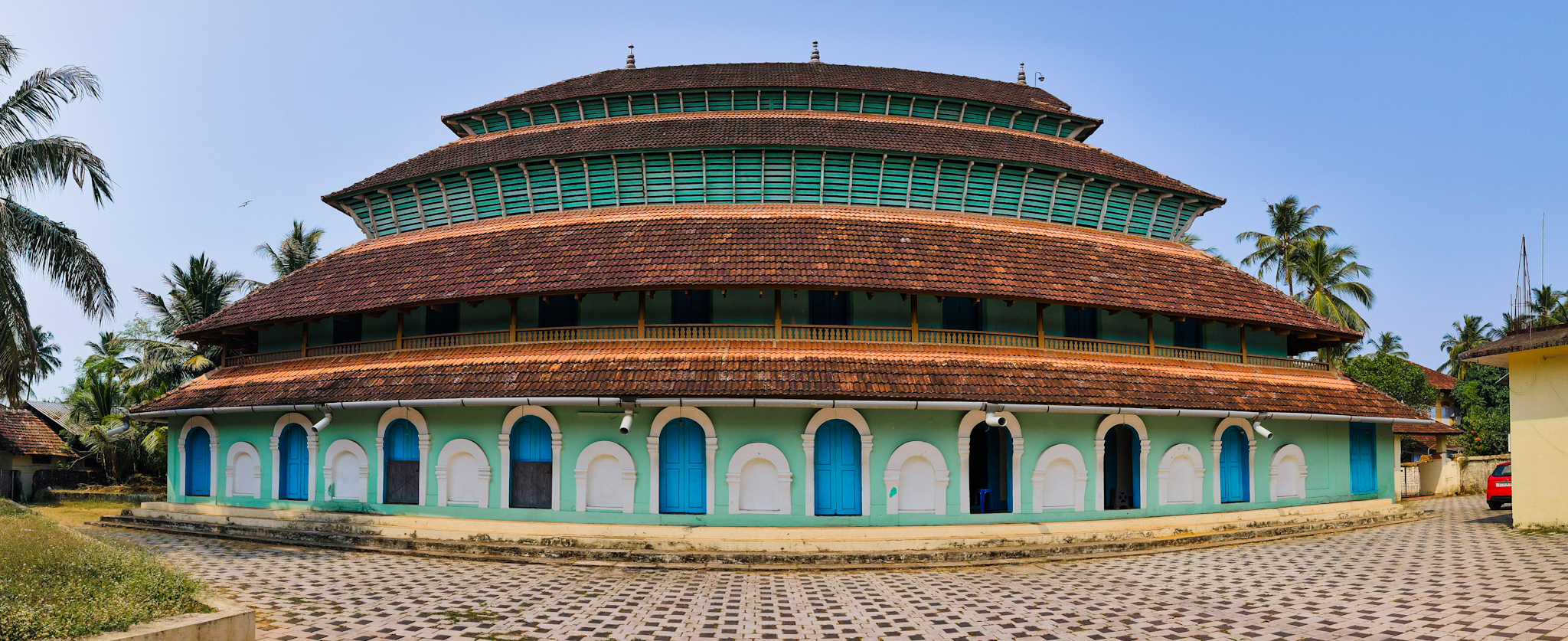
Mishkal Mosque

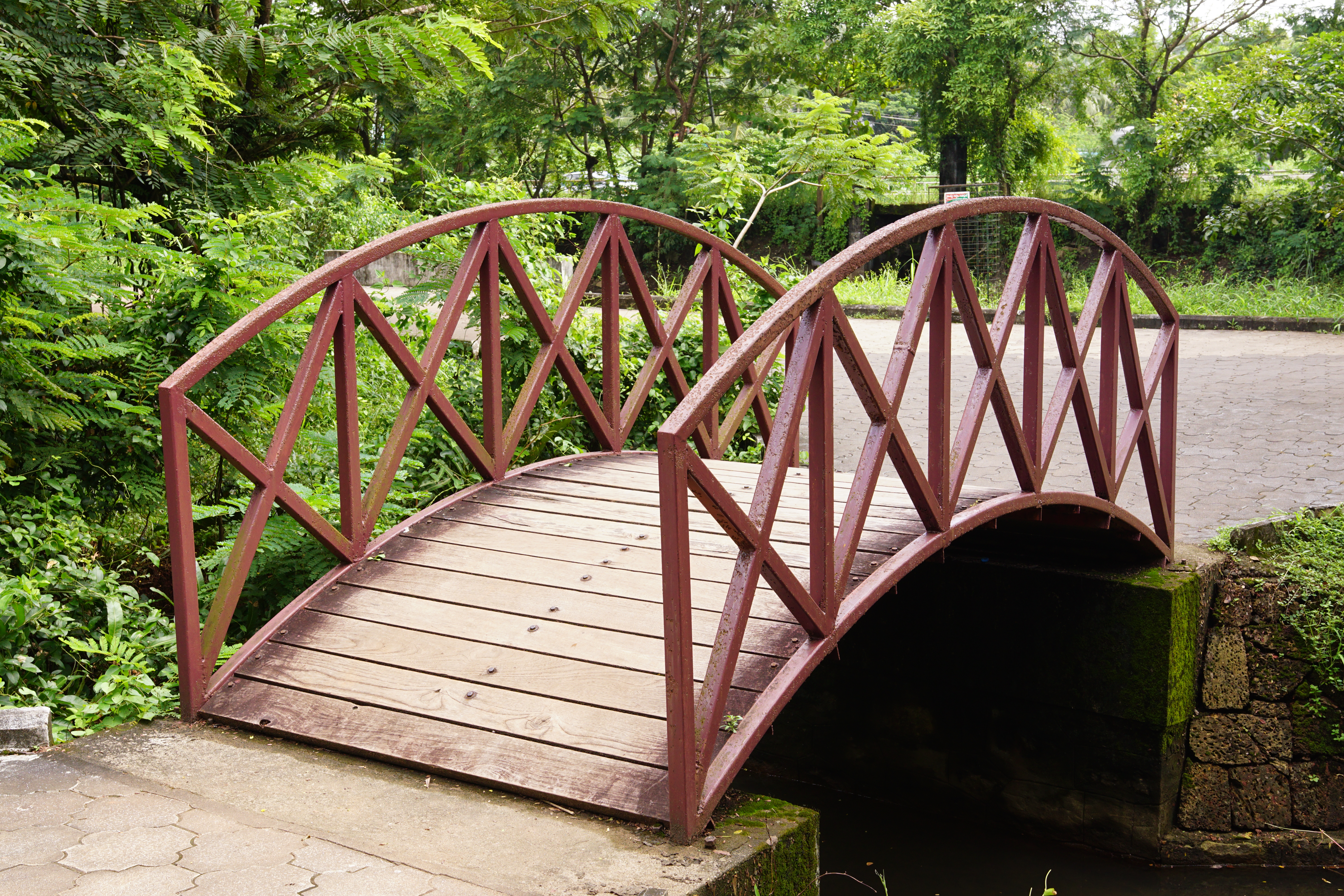
Sarovaram Bio Park

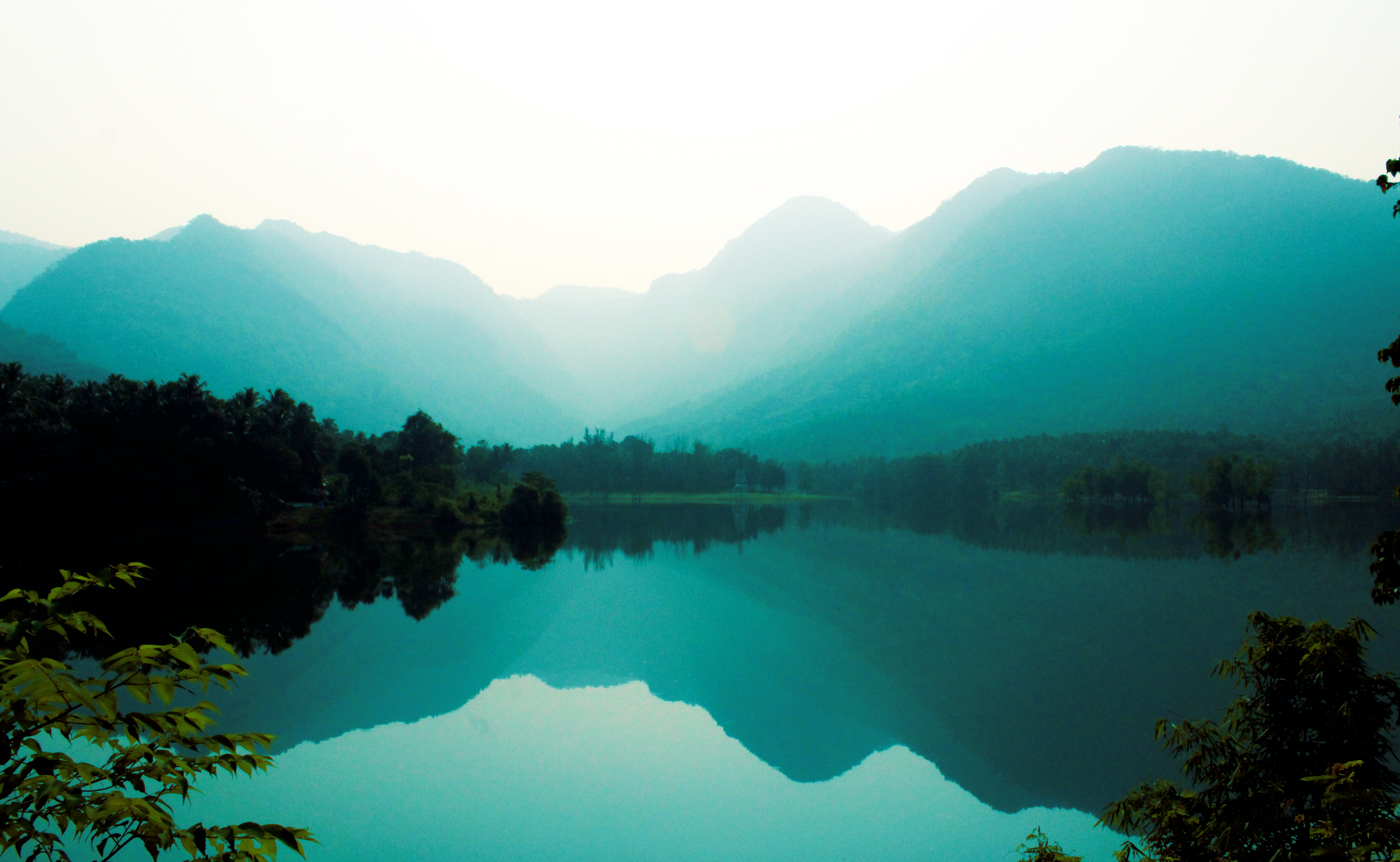
Kakkayam Dam

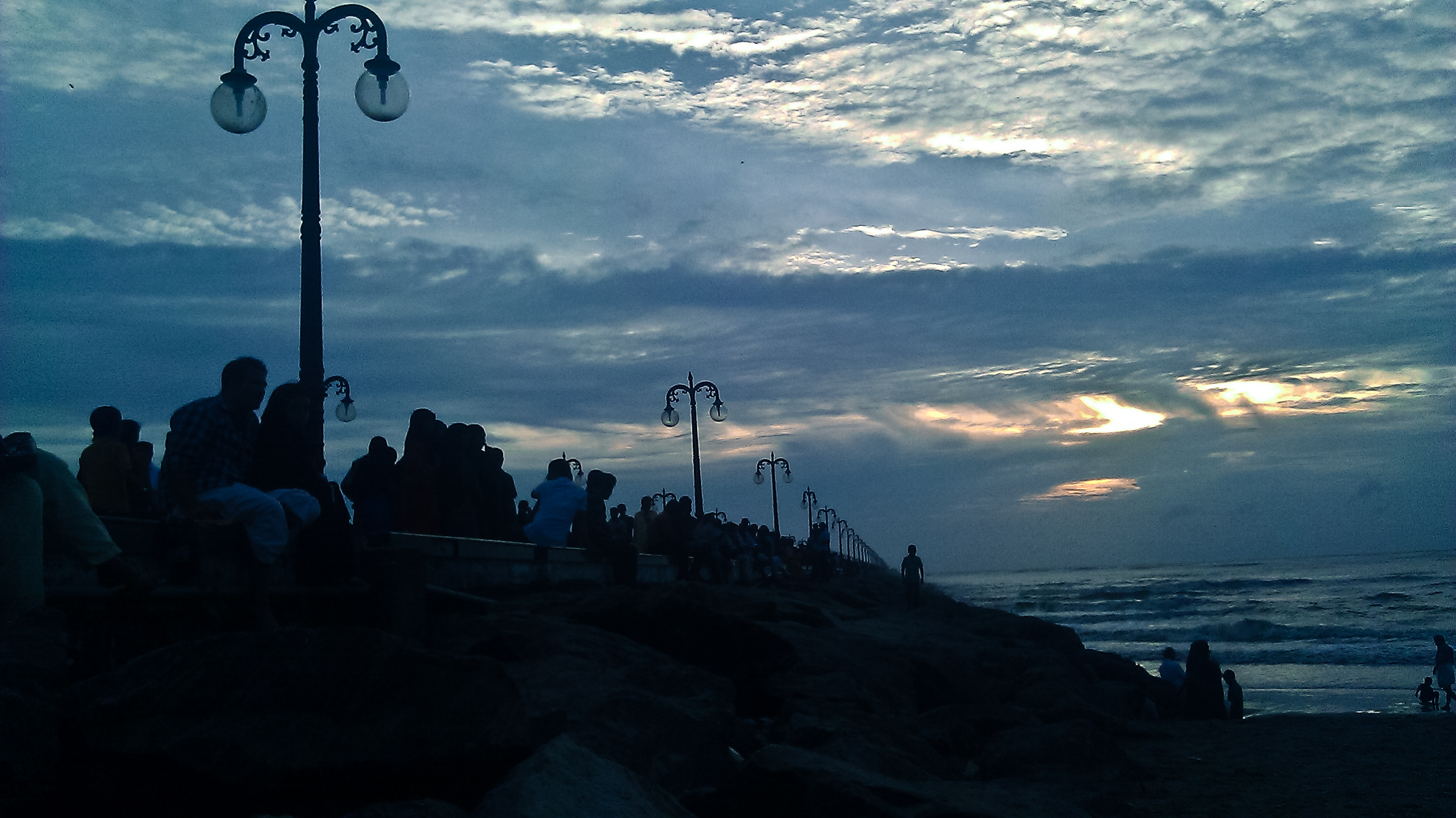
Beypore

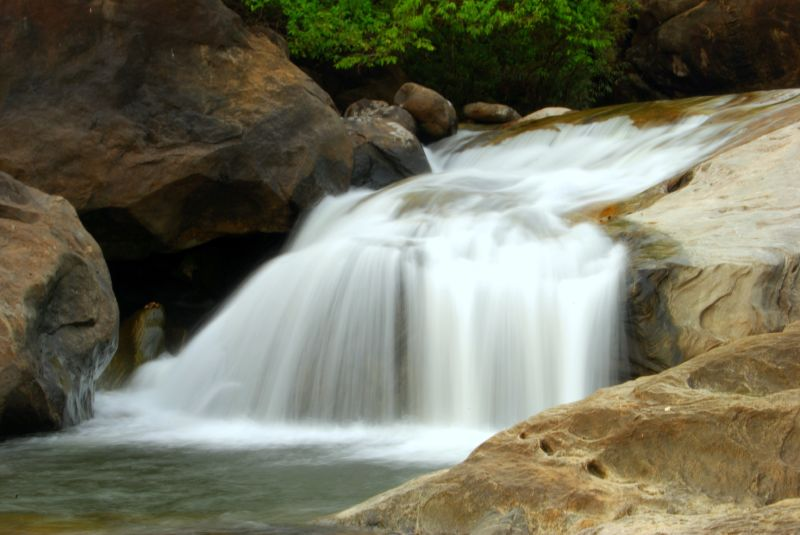
Aripara Falls

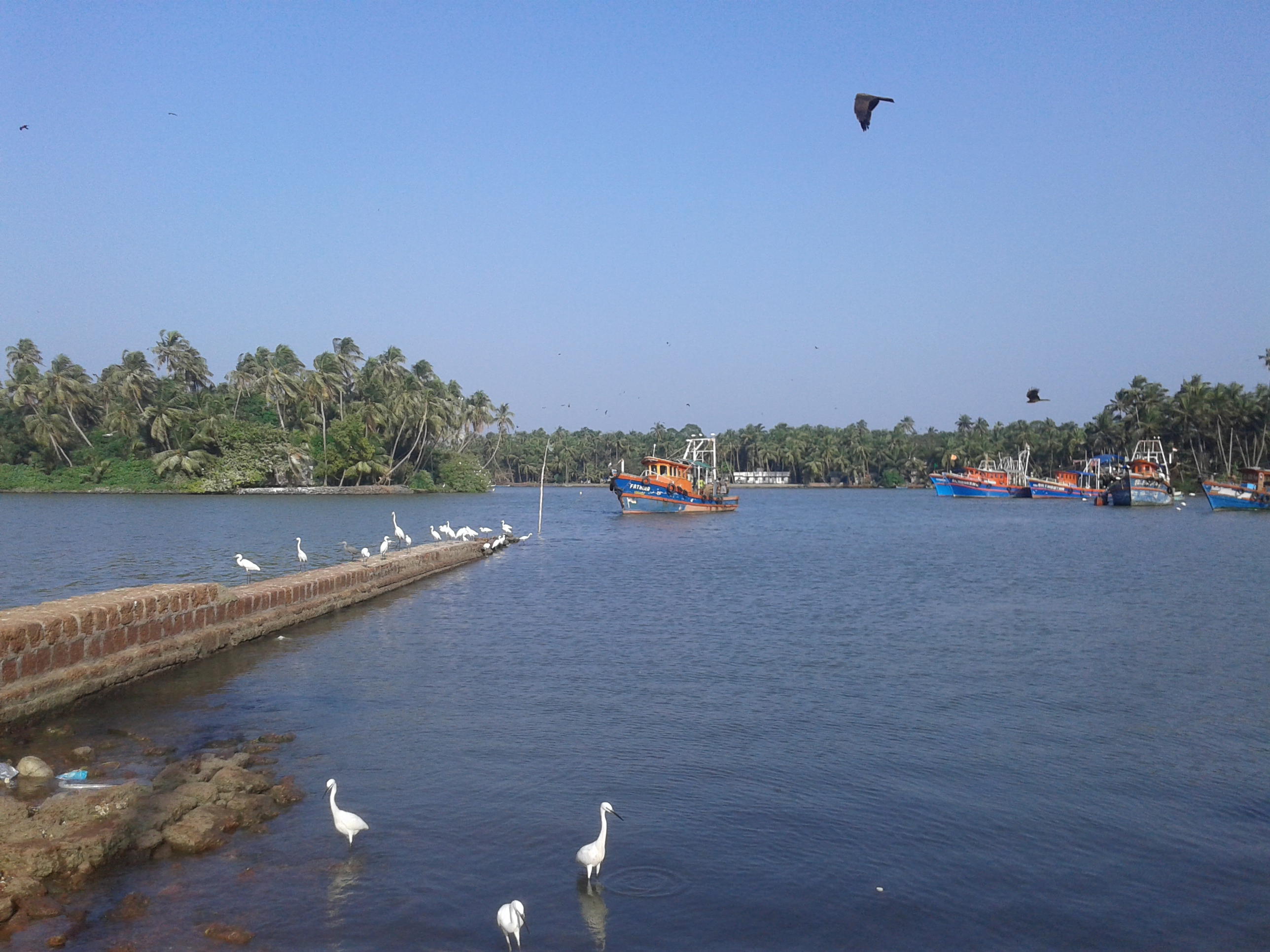
Chaliyam

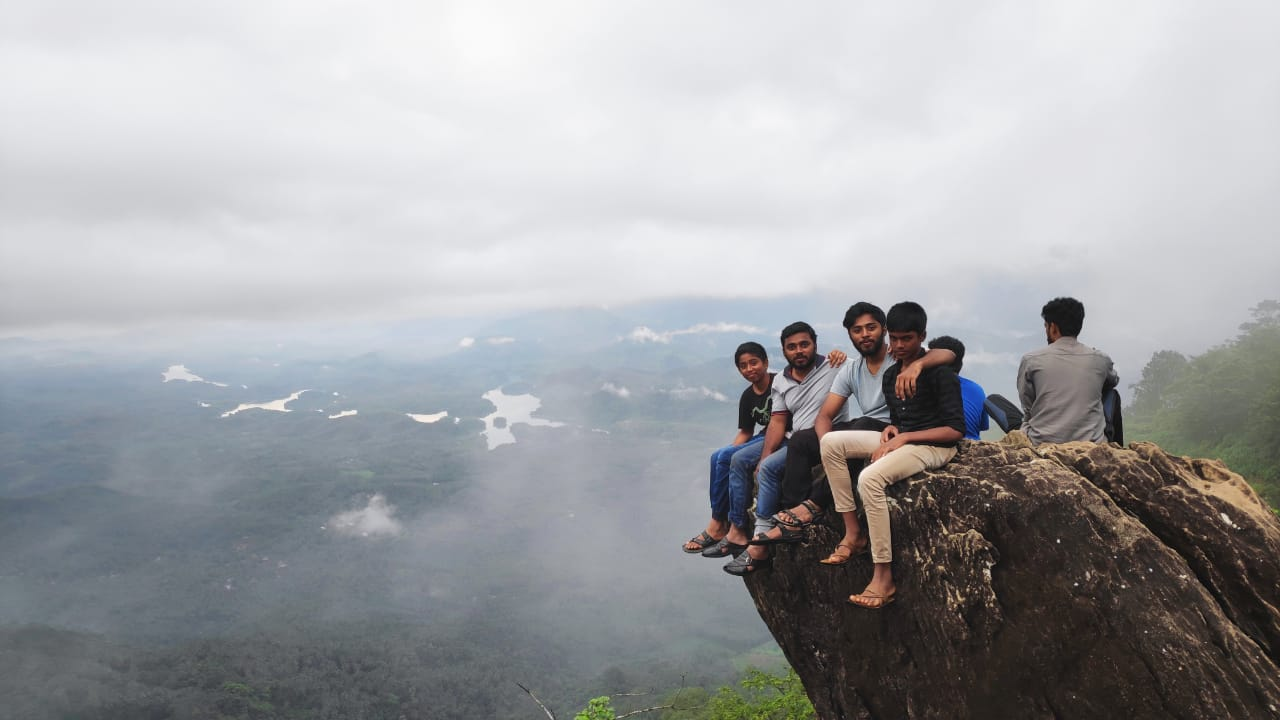
Vayalada

=== Malappuram ===
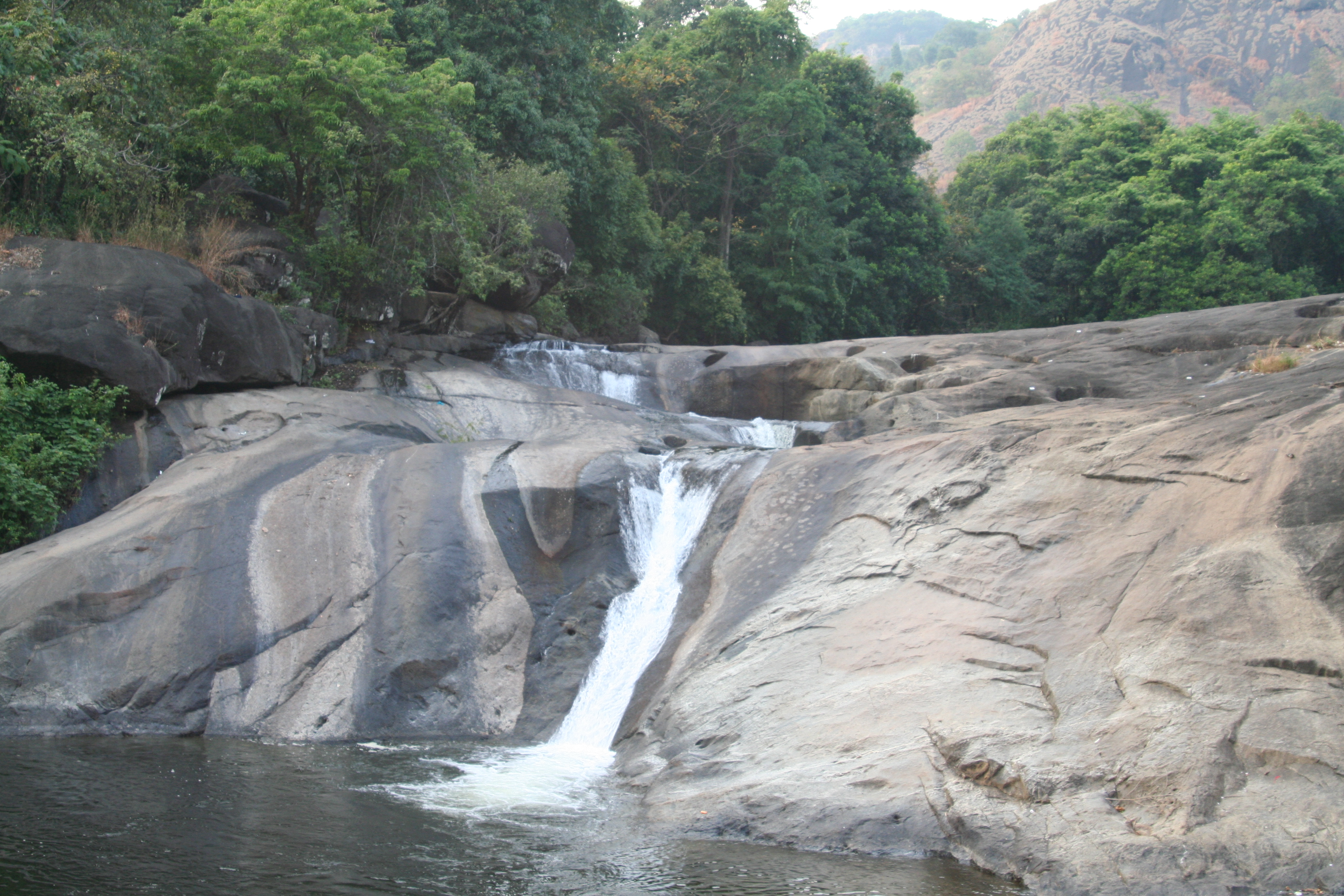
Adyanpara Falls

- Adyanpara Falls
- Anginda peak
- Arimbra Hills (also known as "Mini-Ooty")
- Arya Vaidya Sala – health centre known for its heritage and expertise in the Indian traditional medicine system of ayurveda
- Ayyapanov Waterfalls
- Bharathappuzha – second-longest river in Kerala, also known as the Ponnani, Nila, and Perar river
- Biyyam Kayal – backwater lake at Ponnani
- Chaliyar – fourth-longest river in Kerala. Conolly's plot, the world's oldest teak plantation, is adjacent to the river
- Chamravattom Regulator-cum-Bridge – largest regulator-cum bridge of Kerala; connects Tirur Taluk with Ponnani port
- Chekkunnu Mala – a misty green hill near to Chaliyar at Edavanna
- Cherumb eco-tourist village (Karuvarakundu)
- Kadalundi Bird Sanctuary – home to more than a hundred species of native birds and over 60 species of migratory birds
- Kadalundi–Vallikkunnu community reserve – first community reserve in Kerala and an eco-tourism spot
- Kakkadampoyil – hilly village on the bank of Cherupuzha
- Keralamkundu waterfalls (Karuvarakundu)
- Kollam Kolli Waterfalls
- Kottakkunnu ("The Marine Drive of Malappuram") – site of an old fort, water park, and ancient murals in the middle of Malappuram city
- Kuttippuram bridge – One of the largest and oldest bridges built over the river Bharathappuzha
- Mukurthi – fifth-highest peak in South India
- Nadukani Churam – a Ghat Road that connects Malappuram district with the hilly district of Nilgiris in Tamil Nadu
- Nedumkayam Rainforest – part of the Nilgiri Biosphere Reserve
- New Amarambalam Reserved Forest – wildlife sanctuary near Nilambur
- Nilambur Kovilakam – headquarters of the Nilambur royal family
- Nilambur–Shoranur line – one of the shortest broad-gauge railway lines in India
- Noor Lake
- Oorakam Hill
- Poorappuzha River – scenic coastal tributary of the Kadalundi River
- Padinjarekara Azhimukham beach – the Tirur River and Bharathappuzha rivers join the Arabian Sea here; the estuary is a centre for migratory birds
- Paloor Kotta Falls
- Perinthalmanna
- Parappanangadi beach (Parappanangadi)
- Paravanna beach (Vettom)
- Ponnani beach
- Poonathanam Illam – birthplace of 16th-century Malayalam poet Poonthanam Nambudiri near Perinthalmanna
- Poorappuzha Azhimukham – an estuary at Tanur
- Silent Valley National Park
- Tanur beach
- Teak Museum – world's first teak plantation
- Thunchan Parambu – birthplace of Thunchaththu Ezhuthachan, who is known as the father of modern Malayalam language
- Tirur River
- Unity hill viewpoint (Manjeri)
- Unniyal beach (Niramarutur)
- Vakkad beach
- Vallikunnu beach
- Vavul Mala – mountain range near Chungathara
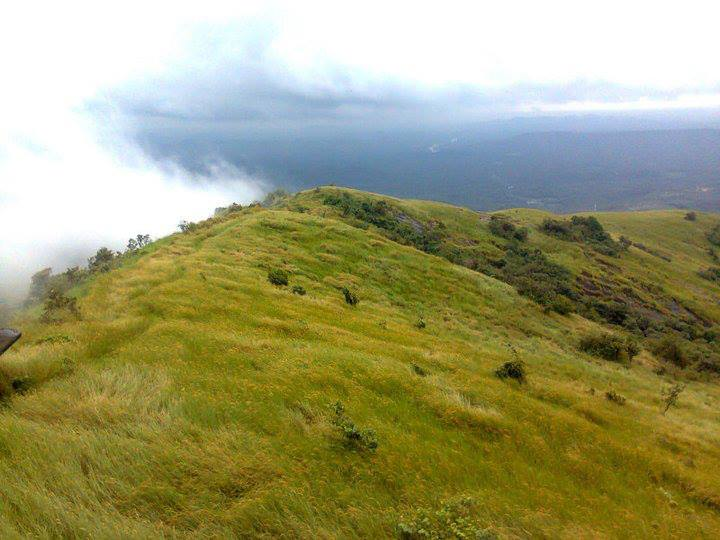
Kodikuthimala

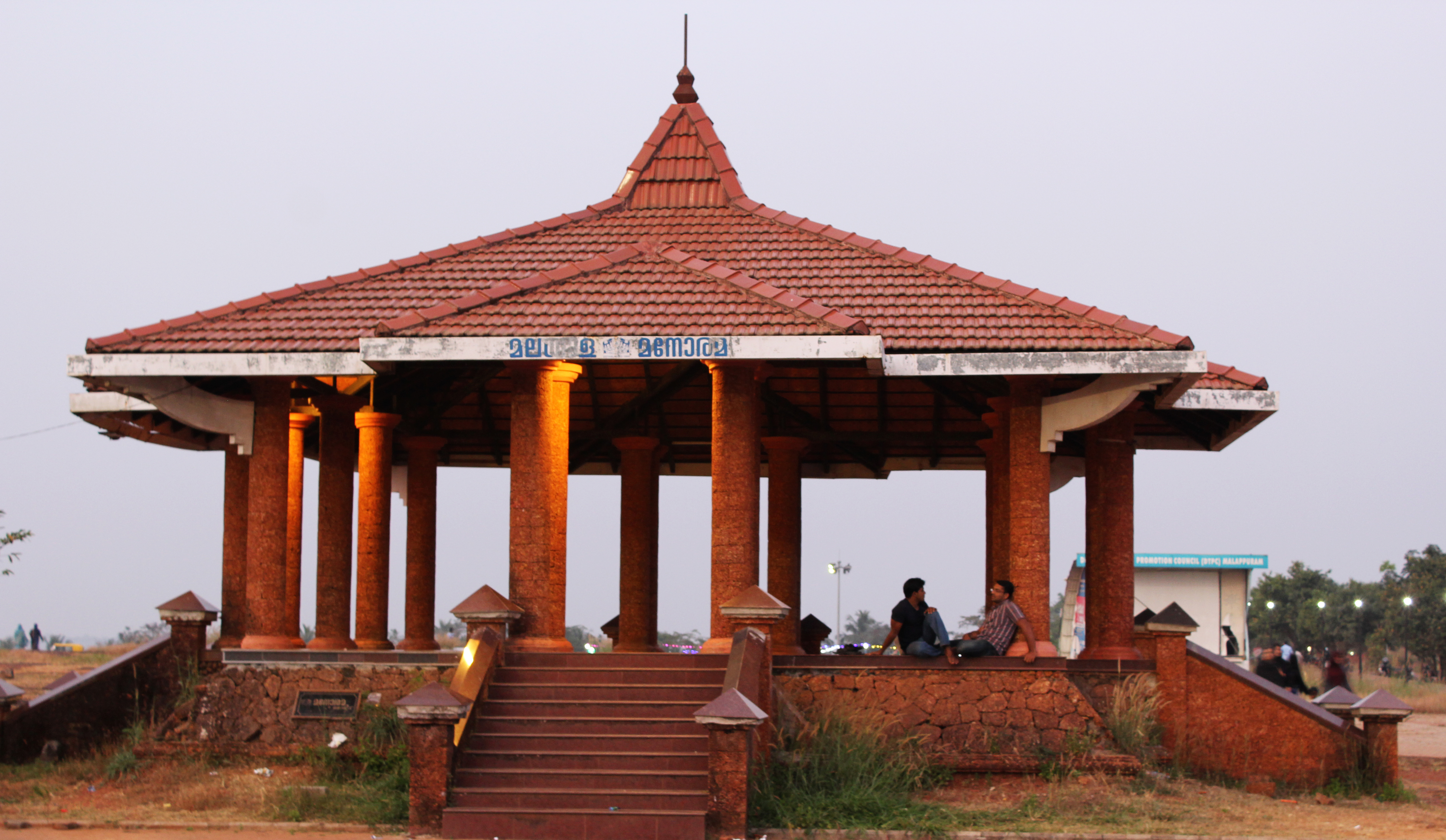
Kottakkunnu

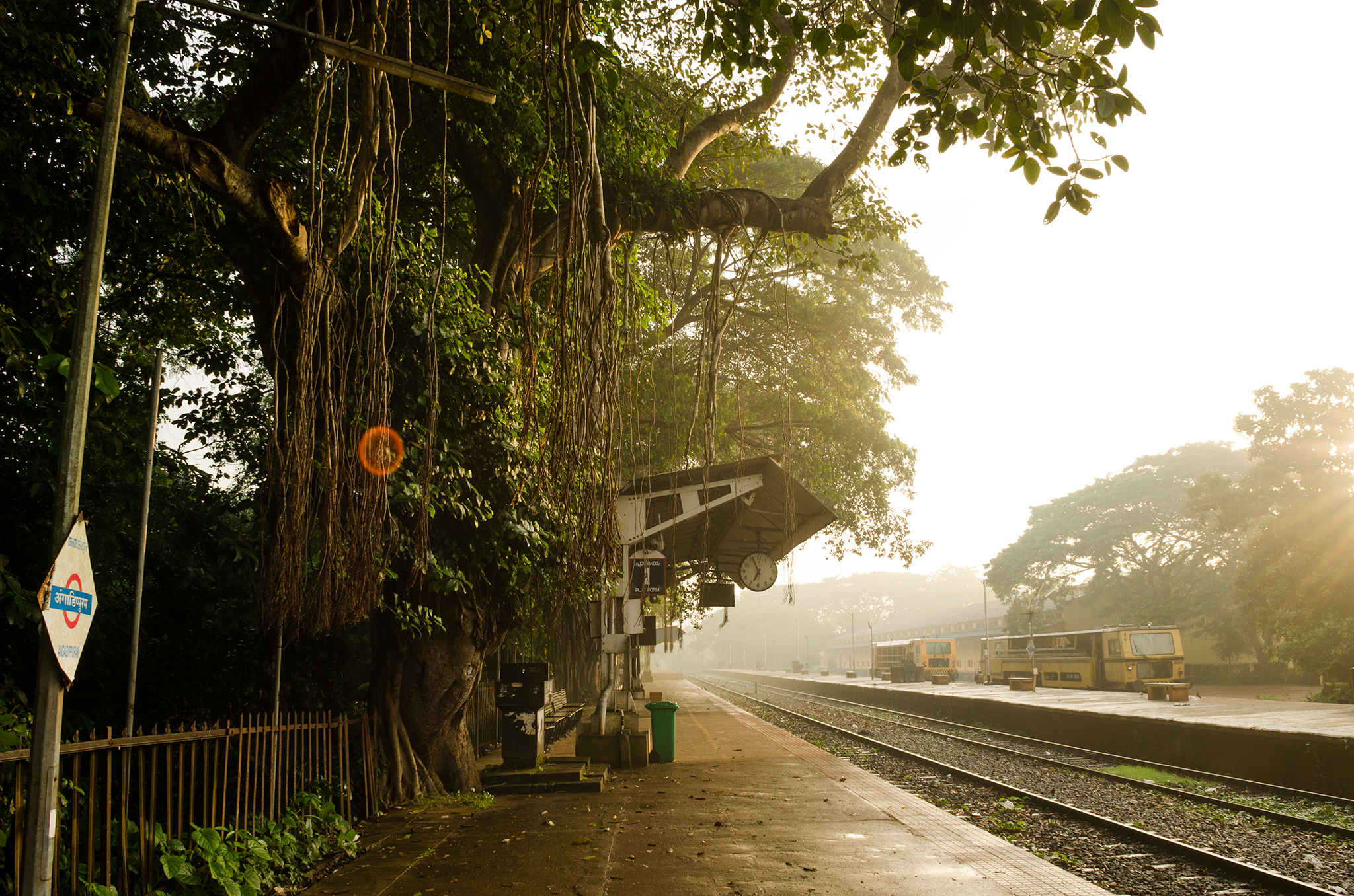
Nilambur–Shoranur line at Angadipuram

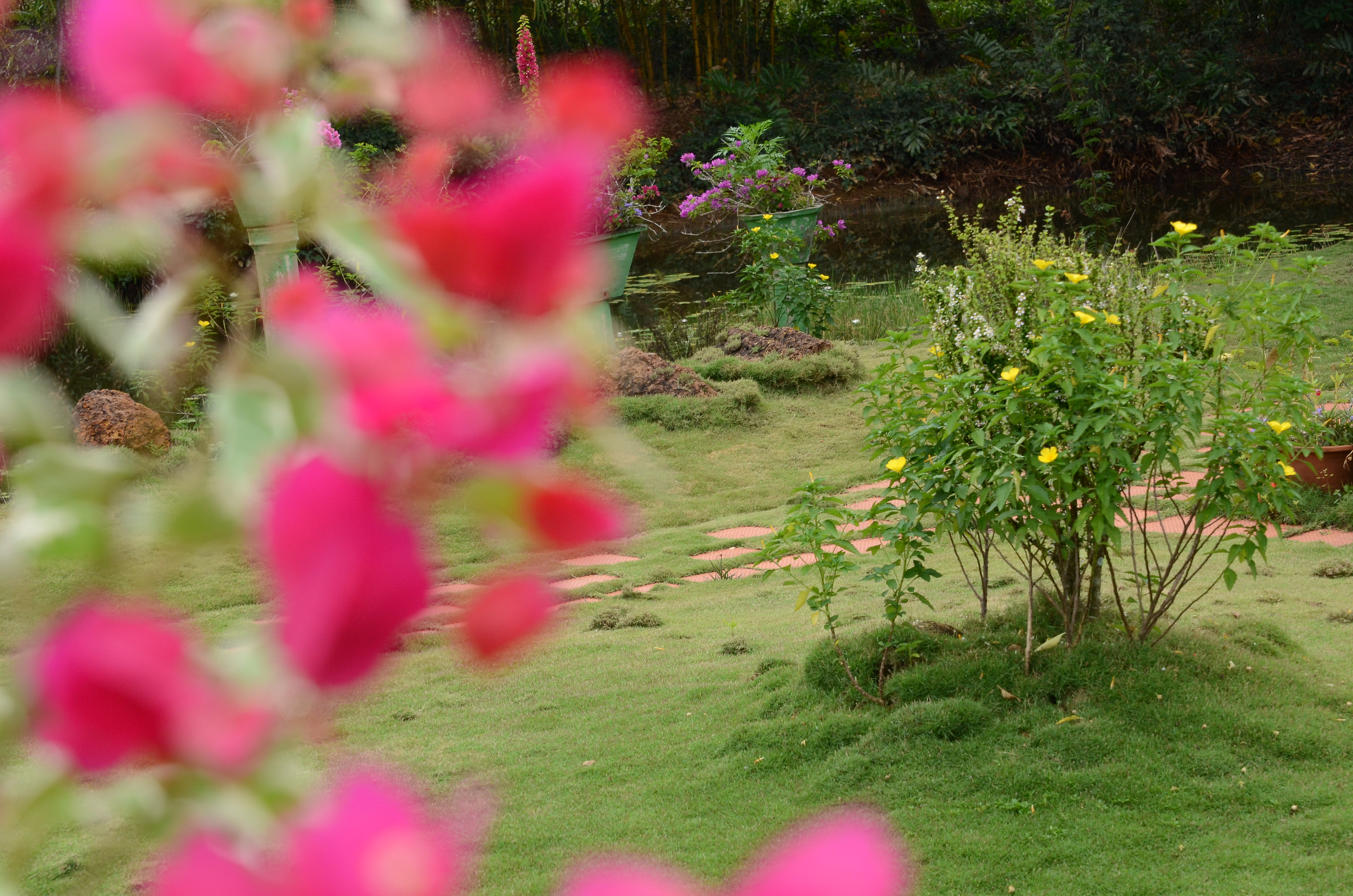
Noor Lake, Tirur

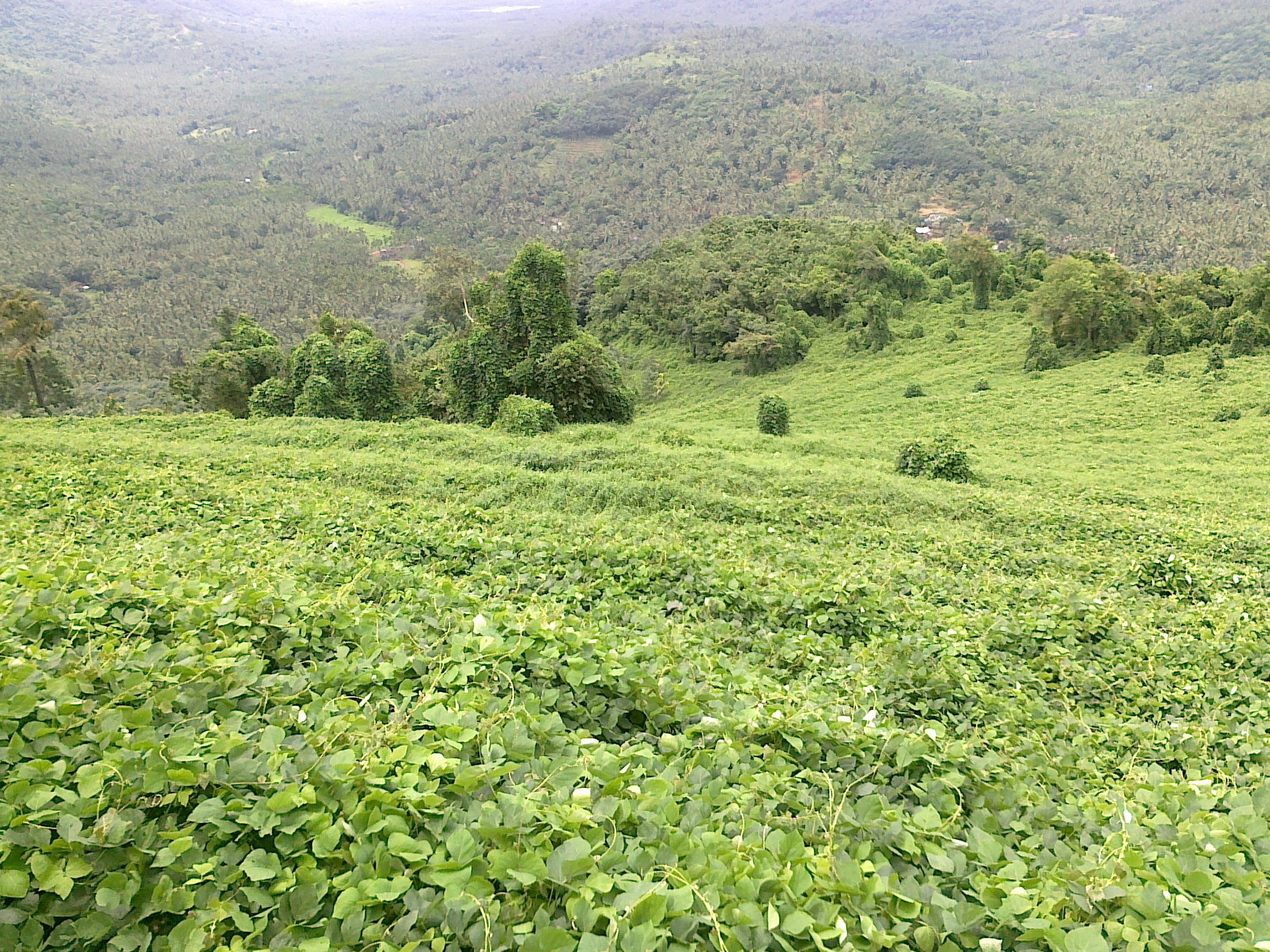
Arimbra Hills

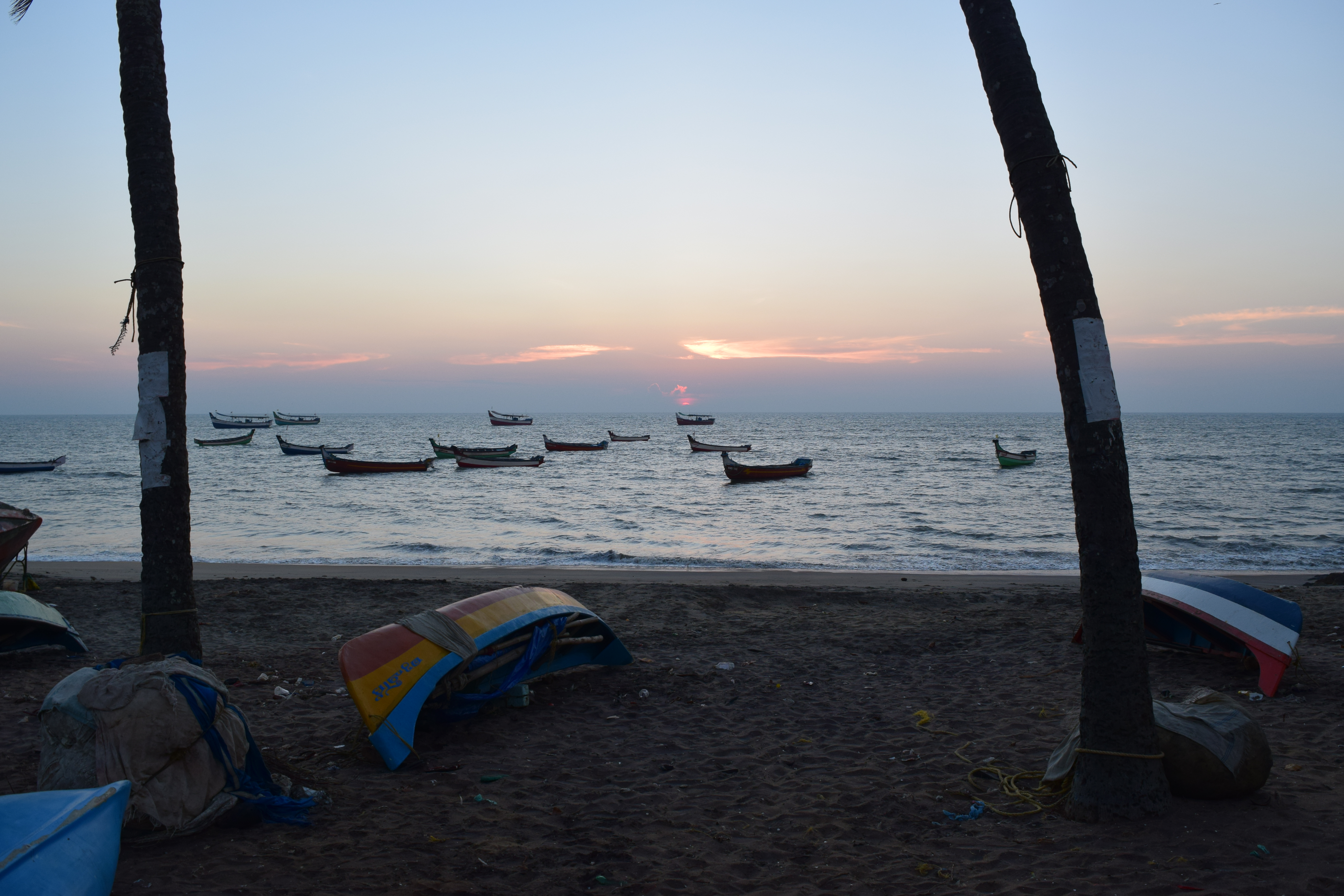
Arabian Sea at Parappanangadi

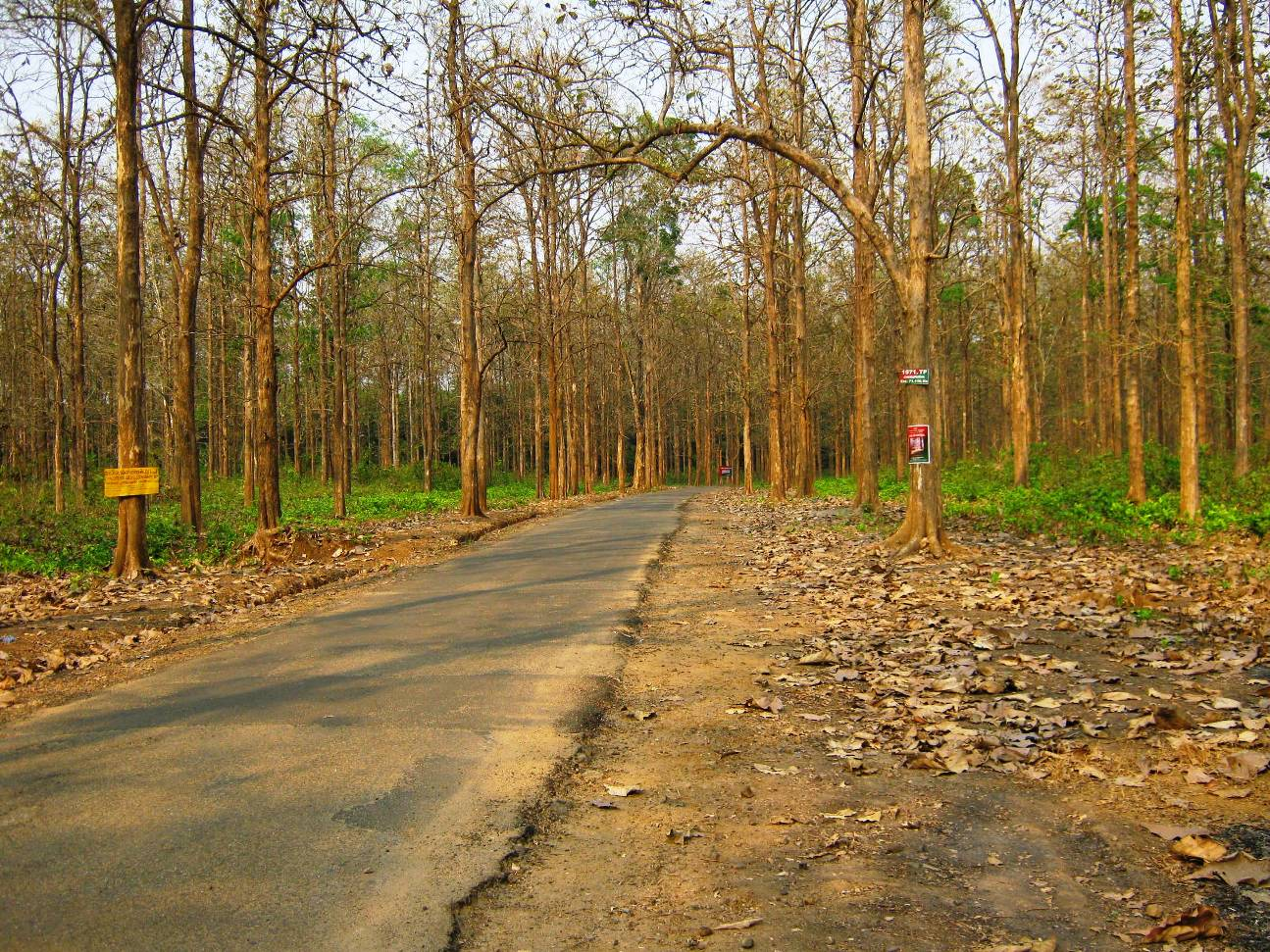
Nedumkayam Reserved Forest near Nilambur

=== Palakkad ===
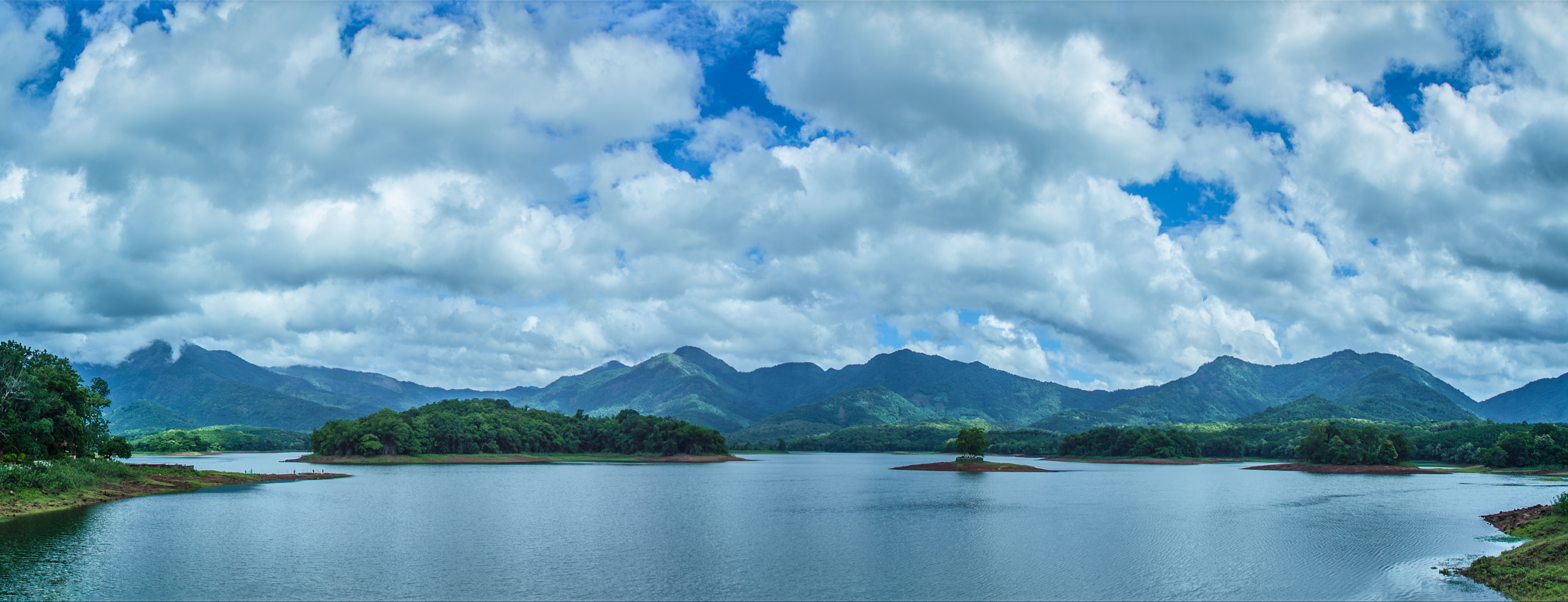
View of the Western Ghats Mountain Range from Mangalam Dam Reservoir

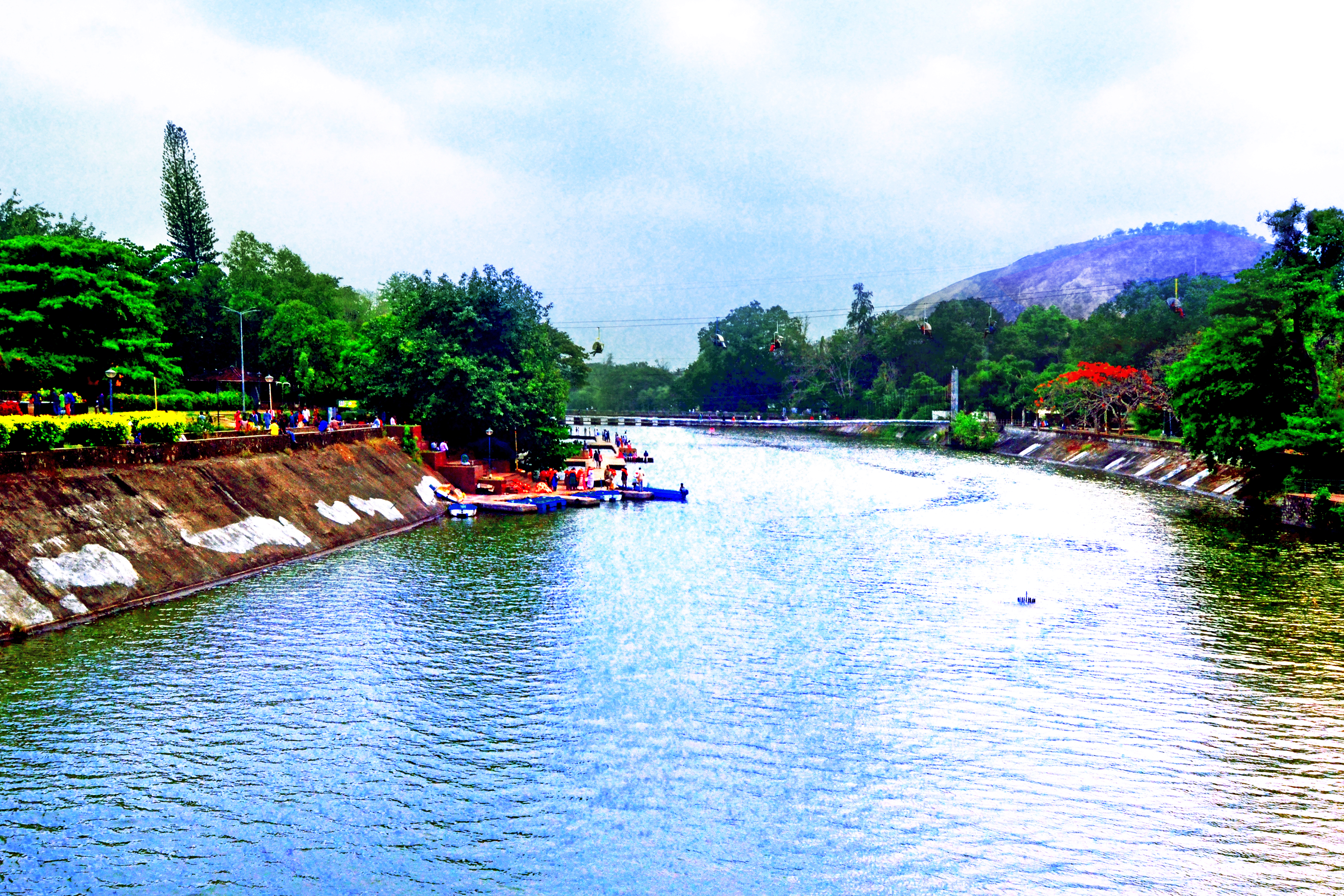
Malampuzha Dam

- Attappadi Reserve Forest
- Dhoni Waterfalls
- Elivai Mala
- Fantasy Park
- Kanjirapuzha Dam
- Kannimara Teak
- Karimpuzha Kovilakam
- Kollengode Palace
- Malampuzha Dam
- Malampuzha Garden
- Mampara peak (Raja's cliff)
- Mangalam Dam
- Meenvallam Waterfalls
- Meenkara Dam
- Nelliampathi hillstation
- Palakkad Fort
- Parambikulam Dam
- Parambikulam Tiger Reserve
- Pothundi Dam
- Silent Valley National Park
- Siruvani Dam
- Siruvani Waterfalls
- Varikkasseri Mana
- Walayar Dam

=== Silent Valley National Park ===
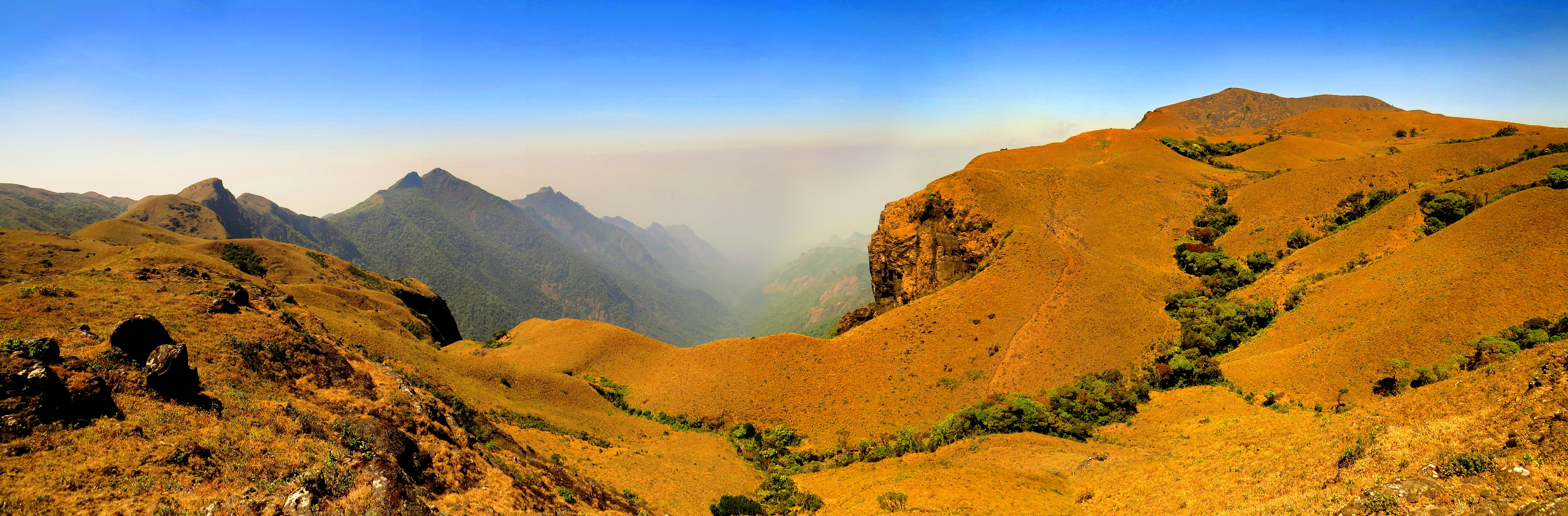
Silent Valley National Park, Kerala

This national park is located in the rich biodiversity of Nilgiri Biosphere Reserve. Additional nearby protected areas include the Karimpuzha Wildlife Sanctuary, New Amarambalam Reserved Forest, Nedumkayam Rainforest, Attappadi Reserved Forest, and Mukurthi National Park. Mukurthi peak, the fifth-highest peak in South India, and Anginda peak are also located in its vicinity. Bhavani River (a tributary of Kaveri River), Kunthipuzha River (a tributary of the Bharathappuzha), and the Kadalundi River originate in the vicinity of Silent Valley.

== Notable people ==
=== Kozhikode ===
==== Literature ====
- S. K. Pottekkatt
- Thikkodiyan
- Punathil Kunjabdulla
- U. A. Khader
- Akbar Kakkattil
- N. N. Kakkad
- P. Valsala
- M. N. Karassery

==== Music ====
- M. S. Baburaj
- Baburaj
- Gireesh Puthenchery

==== Film ====
- I. V. Sasi
- T. Damodaran
- Ummer
- Mammukoya
- Balan K. Nair
- Santha Devi
- Parvathy Thiruvothu
- Kuthiravattam Pappu
- Ranjith
- V. M. Vinu
- A. Vincent
- Shajoon Kariyal
- Anjali Menon
- P. S. Nivas
- Neeraj Madhav
- Madhupal
- Anoop Menon
- Nellikode Bhaskaran

==== Sports ====
- T. Abdul Rahman
- P. T. Usha
- Jaseel P. Ismail
- V. Diju
- Aparna Balan
- Arun Vishnu

=== Malappuram ===
- A. Vijayaraghavan – former member of Rajya Sabha and the state secretary of CPI(M)
- A. P. Anil Kumar – former minister of Kerala
- A. R. Raja Raja Varma – Malayalam poet and grammatician
- Abdul Nediyodath – professional footballer
- Abdurahiman Randathani – politician
- Achyutha Pisharadi – Sanskrit grammarian, astronomer, and mathematician
- Adil Ibrahim – actor
- Ahmad Kutty – North American Islamic scholar
- Ajijesh Pachat – Malayalam novelist, short story writer, and columnist
- Akkitham Achuthan Namboothiri – Malayalam poet and essayist
- Akkitham Narayanan – painter
- Ali Musliyar – freedom activist
- Ammu Swaminathan – independence activist and a member of Constituent Assembly of India
- Anas Edathodika – professional footballer
- Aneesh G. Menon – actor
- Anikha – actress
- Aparna Nair – actress
- Arjun Jayaraj – professional footballer
- Artist Namboothiri – painter
- Aryadan Muhammed – former minister of Kerala
- Aryadan Shoukath – film producer
- Ashique Kuruniyan – professional footballer
- Asif Saheer – professional footballer
- Azad Moopen – doctor and philanthropist
- B. M. Kutty – journalist and activist
- Balamani Amma – writer of Malayalam literature
- C. Karunakara Menon – journalist and politician
- C. Radhakrishnan – writer and film director
- C. N. Ahmad Moulavi – writer of Malayalam literature
- Chakkeeri Ahemed Kutty – former minister of Kerala and former speaker of Kerala Legislative Assembly
- Chalilakath Kunahmed Haji – social reformer
- Cherukad Govinda Pisharody – Malayalam playwright, novelist, poet, and political activist
- Damodara – astronomer and mathematician
- Deepu Pradeep – scriptwriter
- Devdutt Padikkal – cricketer
- Dhanish Karthik – actor
- Dileep K. Nair – educationist, skill development campaigner, social activist, and publisher
- E. Harikumar – Malayalam novelist and short story writer
- E. Moidu Moulavi – Indian freedom fighter and Islamic scholar
- E. Sreedharan – Metroman of India
- E. K. Imbichi Bava – politician
- E. M. S. Namboodiripad – first Chief Minister of Kerala and the founder of CPI(M)
- E. T. Mohammed Basheer – former minister of Kerala and member of Lok Sabha
- Edasseri Govindan Nair – poet
- Elamaram Kareem – former minister of Kerala and member of Rajya Sabha
- Faisal Kutty – lawyer, academic, writer, public speaker, and human rights activist
- Gopinath Muthukad – magician and motivational speaker
- Govinda Bhattathiri – astrologer and astronomer
- Hari Nair – cinematographer
- Hemanth Menon – actor
- Indrajith Sukumaran – film actor and playback singer
- Iqbal Kuttippuram – screenwriter and homoeopathic physician
- Jayasree Kalathil – writer, translator, mental health researcher, and activist
- K. Abdurahman – founder of Chaliyar movement
- K. Avukader Kutty Naha – former deputy chief minister of Kerala
- K. C. S. Paniker – metaphysical and abstract painter
- K. C. Manavedan Raja – Indian aristocrat
- K. M. Asif – cricketer
- K. M. Maulavi – Indian freedom fighter, social reformer, and the founding vice-president of IUML Malabar District committee
- K. P. A. Majeed – former Chief Whip of the Government of Kerala
- K. P. Ramanunni – writer
- K. T. Irfan – athlete
- K. T. Jaleel – former minister of Kerala
- K. T. Muhammed- Malayalam playwright and screenwriter
- K. V. Rabiya – social worker
- K. V. Ramakrishnan – Malayalam–language poet and journalist
- Kadavanad Kuttikrishnan – Malayalam poet and journalist
- Kalamandalam Kalyanikutty Amma – resurrector of Mohiniyattam
- Kamala Surayya – writer of Malayalam literature
- Kerala Varma Valiya Koil Thampuran – Malayalam poet and translator
- Krishnachandran – actor, dubbing artist, and playback singer
- Kuttikrishna Marar – essayist and literary critic of Malayalam literature
- Lakshmi Sahgal – revolutionary in the Indian independence movement, officer of the Indian National Army, and the Minister of Women's Affairs in the Azad Hind government
- M. Govindan – writer of Malayalam literature
- M. Swaraj – politician
- M. G. S. Narayanan – historian, and academic and political commentator
- M. K. Vellodi – former Indian diplomat
- M. M. Akbar – Islamic scholar
- M. P. Abdussamad Samadani – former member of Rajya Sabha
- M. P. M. Ahammed Kurikkal – former minister of Kerala
- M. P. M. Menon – Indian diplomat and ambassador
- M. T. Vasudevan Nair – Malayalam author, screenplay writer, and film director
- Malayath Appunni – Malayalam language poet and children's writer
- Manjalamkuzhi Ali – former minister of Kerala
- Mankada Ravi Varma – cinematographer and director
- Manorama Thampuratti – Sanskrit writer
- Mashoor Shereef – professional footballer
- Melattur Sahadevan – Carnatic music vocalist
- Melpathur Narayana Bhattathiri – mathematical linguist
- Mersheena Neenu – actress
- Mohammed Irshad – professional footballer
- Mohamed Salah – professional footballer
- Mohanakrishnan Kaladi – Malayalam poet
- Moyinkutty Vaidyar – Mappila pattu poet
- Mrinalini Sarabhai – Indian classical dancer
- Muhammad Musthafa – actor and director
- Muhsin Parari – director, writer, and lyricist
- Nalakath Soopy – former minister of Kerala
- Nalapat Narayana Menon – writer of Malayalam literature
- Nandanar – writer of Malayalam literature
- Nilambur Ayisha – actress in the Malayalam film industry
- Nilambur Balan – Malayalam actor
- Nirupama Rao – former foreign secretary of India
- P. Sreeramakrishnan – former speaker of Kerala Legislative Assembly.
- P. Surendran – writer, columnist, art critic, and philanthropist
- P. K. Abdu Rabb – former minister of Kerala
- P. K. Kunhalikutty – former minister of Kerala
- P. K. Warrier – ayurvedic physician and a Padma Bhushan winner
- P. P. Ramachandran – Malayalam poet
- P. V. Abdul Wahab – businessman and a member of Rajya Sabha
- Paloli Mohammed Kutty – former minister of Kerala
- Parameshvara – mathematician and astronomer
- Parvathy Jayadevan – playback singer
- Poonthanam Nambudiri – Malayalam poet
- Premji – social reformer, cultural leader, and actor
- Prithviraj Sukumaran – actor, director, producer, playback singer, and distributor
- Pulapre Balakrishnan – economist and educationalist
- Pulikkottil Hyder – Mappila pattu poet
- Rajeev Nair – writer, lyricist, and producer
- Ranjith Padinhateeri – biological physicist
- Rashin Rahman – actor
- Raja Ravi Varma – painter and artist
- Ravi Menon – actor
- Ravi Vallathol – actor
- Rinshad Reera – student activist
- Salam Bappu – film director
- Salman Kalliyath – professional footballer
- Sangita Madhavan Nair – actress
- Sankaran Embranthiri – Kathakali musician
- Savithri Rajeevan – poet, short story writer, and painter
- Sayyid Sanaullah Makti Tangal – social reformer
- Shahabaz Aman – Playback singer and Composer.
- Shanavas K Bavakutty – film director
- Shweta Menon – model, actress, and television anchor
- Sithara – playback singer, composer, and actor
- Sooraj Thelakkad – actor
- Sukumaran – film actor and producer
- Sunny Wayne – film actor
- Syed Muhammedali Shihab Thangal – religious leader and politician
- T. A. Razzaq – screenwriter
- T. K. Hamza – former minister of Kerala
- T. K. Padmini – painter
- T. M. Nair – political activist of Dravidian movement
- Thunchaththu Ezhuthachan - "father" of Malayalam language
- Tirur Nambissan – Kathakali singer
- U. A. Beeran – former minister of Kerala
- U. Sharaf Ali – professional footballer
- Unni Menon – playback singer
- Uroob – writer of Malayalam literature
- V. Abdurahiman – Minister of Kerala
- V. C. Balakrishna Panicker – poet and writer
- V. T. Bhattathiripad – social reformer
- Vaidyaratnam P. S. Warrier – ayurvedic physician
- Vaidyaratnam Triprangode Moossad – ayurvedic physician
- Vallathol Narayana Menon – Malayalam poet
- Variyan Kunnathu Kunjahammed Haji – Indian freedom fighter
- Vazhenkada Kunchu Nair – Kathakali master and a Padma Shri winner
- Vazhenkada Vijayan – retired principal of Kerala Kalamandalam
- Veliyankode Umar Khasi – freedom fighter and poet
- Vinay Govind – Indian film director
- Zainuddin Makhdoom II – author of Tuhfat Ul Mujahideen
- Zakariya Mohammed – film director, screenwriter, and actor
- Zakeer Mundampara – professional footballer
- Zeenath – actress

=== Palakkad ===
- V. T. Bhattathiripad
- C. P. Mohammed
- Major Ravi
- Anumol
- Manikandan Pattambi
- Kalamandalam Gopi
- M.G. Sasi
- Shivaji (Malayalam actor)
- Anita Nair
- E Sreedharan (Metroman of India)
- Kunchan Nambiar
- K. P. Kesava Menon – idealist, founder of Mathrubhoomi
- Methil Devika
- M. T. Vasudevan Nair
- M. B. Rajesh
- O. V. Vijayan
- K. Sankaranarayanan
- Sudev Nair
- Shashi Tharoor
- T. N. Seshan – former Chief Election Commissioner
- P. R. Pisharoty – Kollengode, father of remote sensing in India
- M. G. Ramachandran – actor and former Chief Minister of Tamil Nadu
- Vidya Balan – Bollywood actress
- Shankar Mahadevan – singer
- Stephen Devassy – pianist
- Priyamani – actress
- Raghuvaran – actor
- P R Nathan – novelist, writer
- Swarnalatha – singer
- Unni Mukundan – actor
- Niranjan EK – decorated military officer
- Govind Padmasoorya – actor
- Samyuktha Menon – actress
- M.P. Sankunni Nair – novelist
- Palghat Mani Iyer – Mridangist
- Kocheril R. Narayanan – former president of India
- V P Menon
- Olappamanna
- O V Vijayan
- Akkitham Achuthan Namboothiri
- Malayattoor Ramakrishnan
- K. S. Sethumadhavan
- P. Unnikrishnan
- Ottapalam Pappan – Malayalam drama and film actor
- Gautham Vasudev Menon – Tamil Film director
- Lal Jose – Malayalam film director
- Anil Radhakrishnan Menon – Malayalam film director
- Bhaskar Menon – first Indian to head a multinational corporation, chairman of Lever Brothers (now Unilever)
- K. P. S. Menon – first Foreign Secretary of India
- M. G. K. Menon – former Union Minister and Scientific Adviser in the Rajiv Gandhi administration
- KP Candeth – Lieutenant General
- Shivshankar Menon – 4th National Security Advisor and 26th foreign secretary
- M. K. Narayanan – former chief of the Intelligence Bureau and former National Security Adviser
- K. Sankaran Nair – former director of Research and Analysis Wing and former High Commissioner of India to Singapore
- C. Venkataraman Sundaram – former director of Indira Gandhi Centre for Atomic Research and Padma Bhushan recipient
- Dhruvan – Malayalam film actor
- Srinish Aravind – television actor

== See also ==
- Malabar pepper
- North Malabar
- South Malabar Gramin Bank
- Malabar District
- Calicut International Airport
- University of Calicut
- Kozhikode
- Zamorin
- Palakkad
- Malappuram
