= List of people from Malappuram district =

This is a list of notable people from Malappuram district, Kerala, India. Malappuram district is one of the 14 districts of Kerala state.

- A. Vijayaraghavan - Former member of Rajya Sabha and the state secretary of CPI(M).
- A. P. Anil Kumar - former minister of Kerala.
- A. R. Raja Raja Varma - Malayalam poet and grammatician known as Kerala Panini (belongs to Parappanad royal family).
- Abdul Nediyodath - an Indian footballer.
- Abdurahiman Randathani - an Indian politician.
- Achyutha Pisharadi - a Sanskrit grammarian, astronomer and mathematician.
- Adil Ibrahim - Actor.
- Ahmad Kutty - a North American Islamic scholar.
- Ajijesh Pachat - Malayalam novelist, short story writer, and columnist.
- Akkitham Achuthan Namboothiri - Malayalam poet and essayist. (Born at Kumaranellur, a border village between Malappuram and Palakkad districts. He was a writer from the Ponnani Kalari)
- Akkitham Narayanan - painter.
- Ali Musliyar - was an Indian freedom fighter.
- Ammu Swaminathan - Independence activist and a member of Constituent Assembly of India.
- Anas Edathodika - an Indian professional footballer.
- Aneesh G. Menon - is an Indian actor
- Anikha - actress.
- Aparna Nair - an Indian actress.
- Arjun Jayaraj - an Indian professional footballer.
- Artist Namboothiri - an Indian painter.
- Aryadan Muhammed - former minister of Kerala.
- Aryadan Shoukath - Indian film producer.
- Ashique Kuruniyan - an Indian professional footballer.
- Asif Saheer - an Indian soccer player.
- Azad Moopen - an Indian doctor and philanthropist.
- Azhvanchery Thamprakkal - Former chief of Nambudiris of Kerala.
- B. M. Kutty - was a journalist and activist.
- Balamani Amma - Writer of Malayalam literature.
- C. Karunakara Menon - was an Indian journalist and politician.
- C. Radhakrishnan - an Indian writer and film director of Malayalam language.
- C. N. Ahmad Moulavi - was an Indian writer of Malayalam literature.
- Chakkeeri Ahemed Kutty - former minister of Kerala and former speaker of Kerala Legislative Assembly.
- Chalilakath Kunahmed Haji - was a social reformer.
- Cherukad - a Malayalam playwright, novelist, poet, and political activist.
- Damodara - was an astronomer-mathematician.
- Deepa Palanadu- Kathakali musician
- Deepu Pradeep - an Indian scriptwriter.
- Devdutt Padikkal - an Indian cricketer.
- Dhanish Karthik - an Indian actor.
- Dileep K. Nair - an Indian educationist, skill development campaigner, social activist, and publisher.
- E. Harikumar - Malayalam novelist and short story writer.
- E. Moidu Moulavi - was an Indian freedom fighter, and an Islamic scholar.
- E. Sreedharan - Metroman of India.
- E. K. Imbichi Bava - was an Indian politician.
- E. M. S. Namboodiripad - The first Chief Minister of Kerala and the founder of CPI(M).
- E. T. Mohammed Basheer - former minister of Kerala.
- Elamaram Kareem - former minister of Kerala.
- Edasseri Govindan Nair - was an Indian poet.
- Elamaram Kareem - Former minister of Kerala and Member of Rajya Sabha.
- Faisal Kutty - a lawyer, academic, writer, public speaker, and human rights activist.
- Gopinath Muthukad - a magician, and motivational speaker.
- Govinda Bhattathiri - was an Indian astrologer and astronomer.
- Hari Nair - an Indian cinematographer.
- Hemanth Menon - an Indian actor.
- Indrajith Sukumaran - film actor and playback singer.
- Iqbal Kuttippuram - an Indian screenwriter and homoeopathic physician.
- Jayasree Kalathil - Writer, translator, mental health researcher, and activist.
- K. Abdurahman - Founder of Chaliyar movement.
- K. Avukader Kutty Naha - a former deputy chief minister of Kerala.
- K. C. S. Paniker - was a metaphysical and abstract painter
- K. C. Manavedan Raja - was an Indian aristocrat.
- K. M. Asif - an Indian cricketer.
- K. M. Maulavi - An Indian freedom fighter, social reformer and the founding vice-president of IUML Malabar district committee.
- K. P. A. Majeed - former Chief Whip of the Government of Kerala.
- K. P. Ramanunni - is a novelist and short-story writer.
- K. T. Irfan - an Indian athlete.
- K. T. Jaleel - former minister of Kerala.
- K. T. Muhammed- was a Malayalam playwright and screenwriter.
- K. V. Rabiya - Social worker.
- K. V. Ramakrishnan - a Malayalam–language poet and journalist.
- Kadavanad Kuttikrishnan - was a Malayalam poet and journalist.
- Kalamandalam Kalyanikutty Amma - a resurrector of Mohiniyattam.
- Kamala Surayya - Writer of Malayalam literature.
- Kerala Varma Valiya Koil Thampuran - Malayalam poet and translator, also known as Kalidasa of Kerala (belongs to Parappanad royal family).
- Kottakkal Madhu - Kathakali Musician, Carnatic Vocalist
- Vaidyaratnam P. S. Varier - Ayurveda Practitioner
- Krishnachandran - an Indian actor, dubbing artist, and playback singer.
- Kuttikrishna Marar - an Indian essayist and literary critic of Malayalam literature.
- Lakshmi Sahgal - a revolutionary of the Indian independence movement, an officer of the Indian National Army, and the Minister of Women's Affairs in the Azad Hind government.
- M. Govindan - Writer of Malayalam literature.
- M. Swaraj - an Indian politician.
- M. G. S. Narayanan - is an Indian historian, and academic and political commentator.
- M. K. Vellodi - former Indian diplomat.
- M. M. Akbar - an Islamic scholar, and an expert in comparative religion.
- M. P. Abdussamad Samadani

Member of parliament MALAPPURAM constituency-

- M. P. M. Ahammed Kurikkal - former minister of Kerala.
- M. P. M. Menon - was an Indian diplomat, ambassador to several countries.
- M. T. Vasudevan Nair - Malayalam author, screenplay writer and film director. (Born at Kudallur, a border village between Malappuram and Palakkad districts. He is a writer from the Ponnani Kalari.)
- Malayath Appunni - a Malayalam language poet and children's writer.
- Manjalamkuzhi Ali - former minister of Kerala.
- Mankada Ravi Varma - was an Indian cinematographer and director.
- Manorama Thampuratti - was a Sanskrit writer.
- Mashoor Shereef - an Indian professional footballer.
- Melattur Sahadevan - a Carnatic music vocalist.
- Melpathur Narayana Bhattathiri - was a mathematical linguist.
- Mersheena Neenu - actress.
- Mohammed Irshad - an Indian professional footballer.
- Mohamed Salah - an Indian footballer.
- Mohanakrishnan Kaladi - a Malayalam poet.
- Moyinkutty Vaidyar - was a Mappila pattu poet.
- Mrinalini Sarabhai - Indian classical dancer.
- Muhammad Musthafa - an Indian film actor and director.
- Muhsin Parari - an Indian film director, writer, and lyricist.
- Nalakath Soopy - former minister of Kerala.
- Nalapat Narayana Menon - Writer of Malayalam literature.
- Nandanar - was an Indian writer of Malayalam literature.
- Nilambur Ayisha - an actress in the Malayalam film industry and drama.
- Nilambur Balan - was a Malayalam actor.
- Nirupama Rao - former foreign secretary of India.
- P. Sreeramakrishnan - former speaker of Kerala Legislative Assembly.
- P. Surendran - is a writer, columnist, art critic, and a philanthropist.
- P. K. Abdu Rabb - former minister of Kerala.
- P. K. Kunhalikutty - former minister of Kerala.
- P. K. Warrier - an Ayurvedic physician and a Padma Bhushan winner.
- P. P. Ramachandran - is a Malayalam poet.
- P. V. Abdul Wahab - Businessman, and a member of Rajya Sabha.
- Paloli Mohammed Kutty - former minister of Kerala.
- Parameshvara - was a major Indian mathematician and astronomer.
- Parvathy Jayadevan - an Indian playback singer.
- Poonthanam Nambudiri - was a Malayalam poet.
- Premji - was a social reformer, cultural leader, and actor.
- Prithviraj Sukumaran - actor, director, producer, playback singer, and distributor.
- Pulapre Balakrishnan - an Indian economist and educationalist.
- Pulikkottil Hyder - was a Mappila pattu poet.
- Rajeev Nair - an Indian writer, lyricist, and producer.
- Ranjith Padinhateeri - an Indian biological physicist and a professor.
- Rashin Rahman - an Indian actor.
- Raja Ravi Varma - Indian painter and artist (belongs to Parappanad royal family).
- Ravi Menon - Actor.
- Ravi Vallathol - was an Indian actor.
- Rinshad Reera - Student Activist.
- Salam Bappu - an Indian film director.
- Salman Kalliyath - an Indian professional footballer.
- Sangita Madhavan Nair - an Indian actress.
- Sankaran Embranthiri - was a Kathakali musician.
- Savithri Rajeevan - an Indian poet, short story writer, and painter.
- Sayyid Sanaullah Makti Tangal - was a social reformer.
- Shahabaz Aman - an Indian playback singer and composer.
- Shanavas K Bavakutty - is an Indian film director.
- Shweta Menon - an Indian model, actress, and television anchor.
- Shylan - Malayalam novelist and short story writer.
- Sithara - an Indian playback singer, composer, and an occasional actor.
- Sooraj Thelakkad - An actor.
- Sukumaran - was an Indian film actor and producer.
- Sunny Wayne - Film actor (stayed during higher education).
- Syed Muhammedali Shihab Thangal - was a religious leader and politician.
- T. A. Razzaq - was an Indian screenwriter.
- T. K. Hamza - former minister of Kerala.
- T. K. Padmini - was an Indian painter.
- T. M. Nair - was an Indian political activist of Dravidian movement.
- Thunchaththu Ezhuthachan- was a Malayalam poet and linguist.
- Tirur Nambissan - was a Kathakali singer.
- U. A. Beeran - former minister of Kerala.
- U. Sharaf Ali - a former Indian International football player.
- Unni Menon - an Indian playback singer.
- Uroob - was a writer of Malayalam literature.
- V. Abdurahiman - Minister of Kerala.
- V. C. Balakrishna Panicker - an Indian poet and writer.
- V. T. Bhattathiripad - Social reformer (hailed from erstwhile Ponnani taluk).
- Vaidyaratnam P. S. Warrier - was an Ayurvedic physician.
- Vaidyaratnam Triprangode Moossad - was an Ayurvedic physician.
- Vallathol Narayana Menon - was a Malayalam poet.
- Variyan Kunnath Kunjahammed Haji - an Indian Freedom Fighter.
- Vazhenkada Kunchu Nair - was a Kathakali master and a Padma Shri winner.
- Vazhenkada Vijayan - Retired principal of Kerala Kalamandalam.
- Veliyankode Umar Khasi - Freedom fighter and poet.
- Vinay Govind - an Indian film director.
- Zainuddin Makhdoom II - The author of Tuhfat Ul Mujahideen.
- Zakariya Mohammed - an Indian Film director, screenwriter, and actor.
- Zakeer Mundampara - an Indian footballer.
- Zeenath - actress.

== See also ==
- Administration of Malappuram
- Education in Malappuram
- History of Malappuram
- List of desoms in Malappuram (1981)
- List of Gram Panchayats in Malappuram
- List of villages in Malappuram
- Transportation in Malappuram
- Malappuram metropolitan area
- Malappuram district
- South Malabar
