= Malappuram =

City in Kerala, India

Malappuram Malappuram
- City
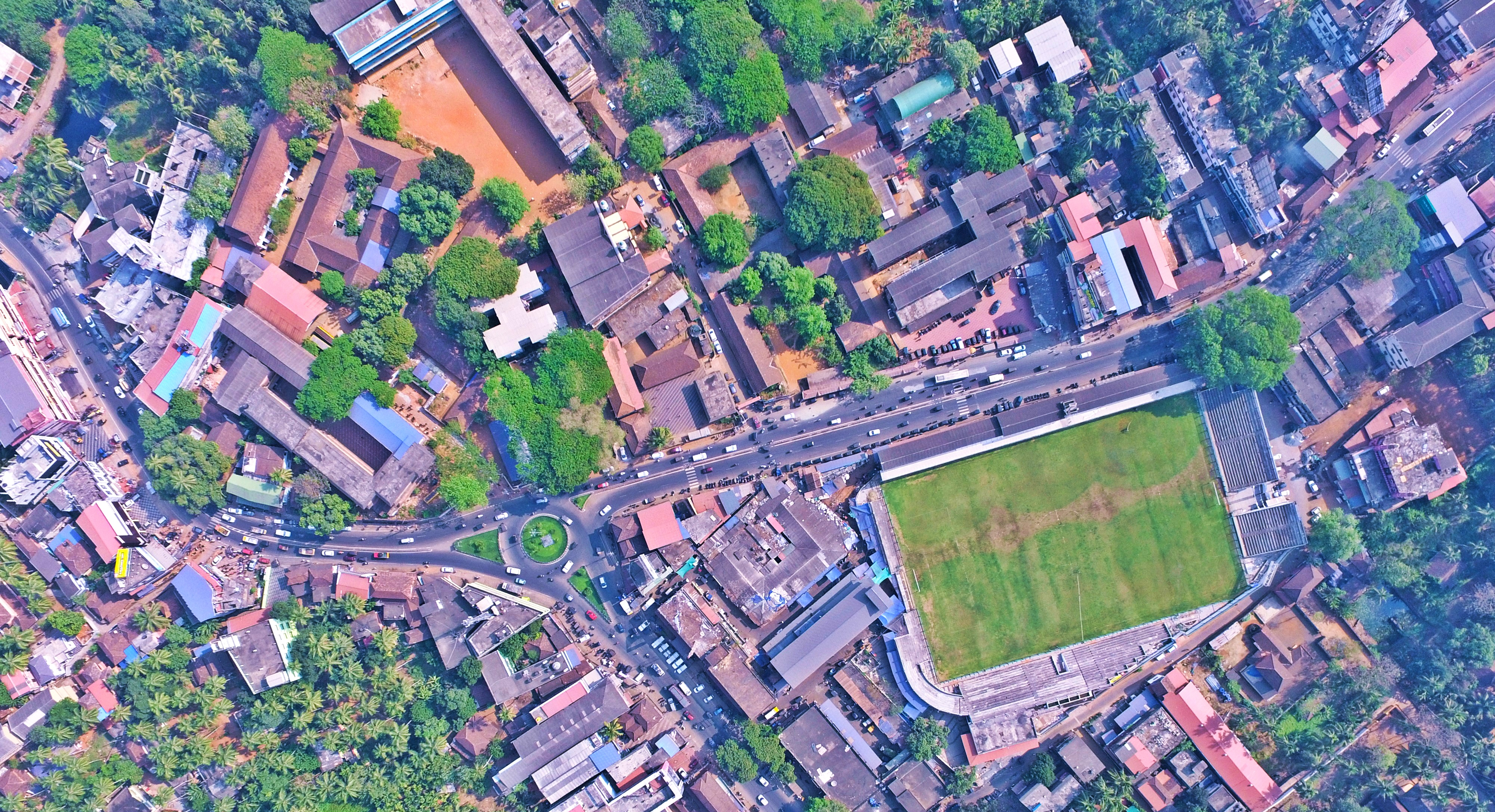
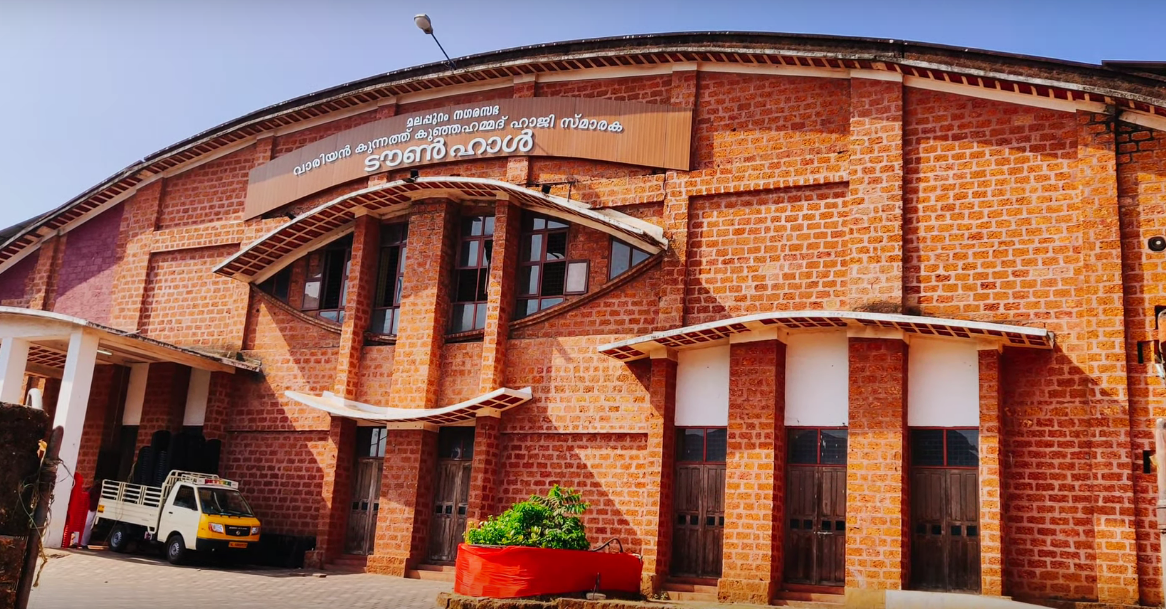
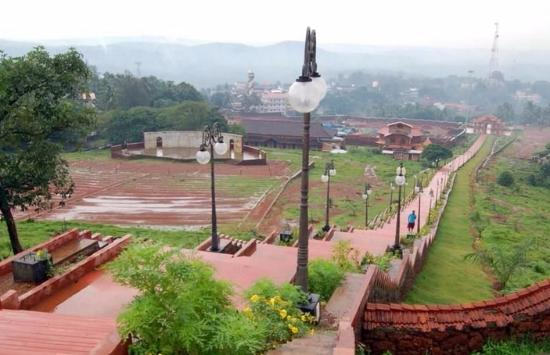
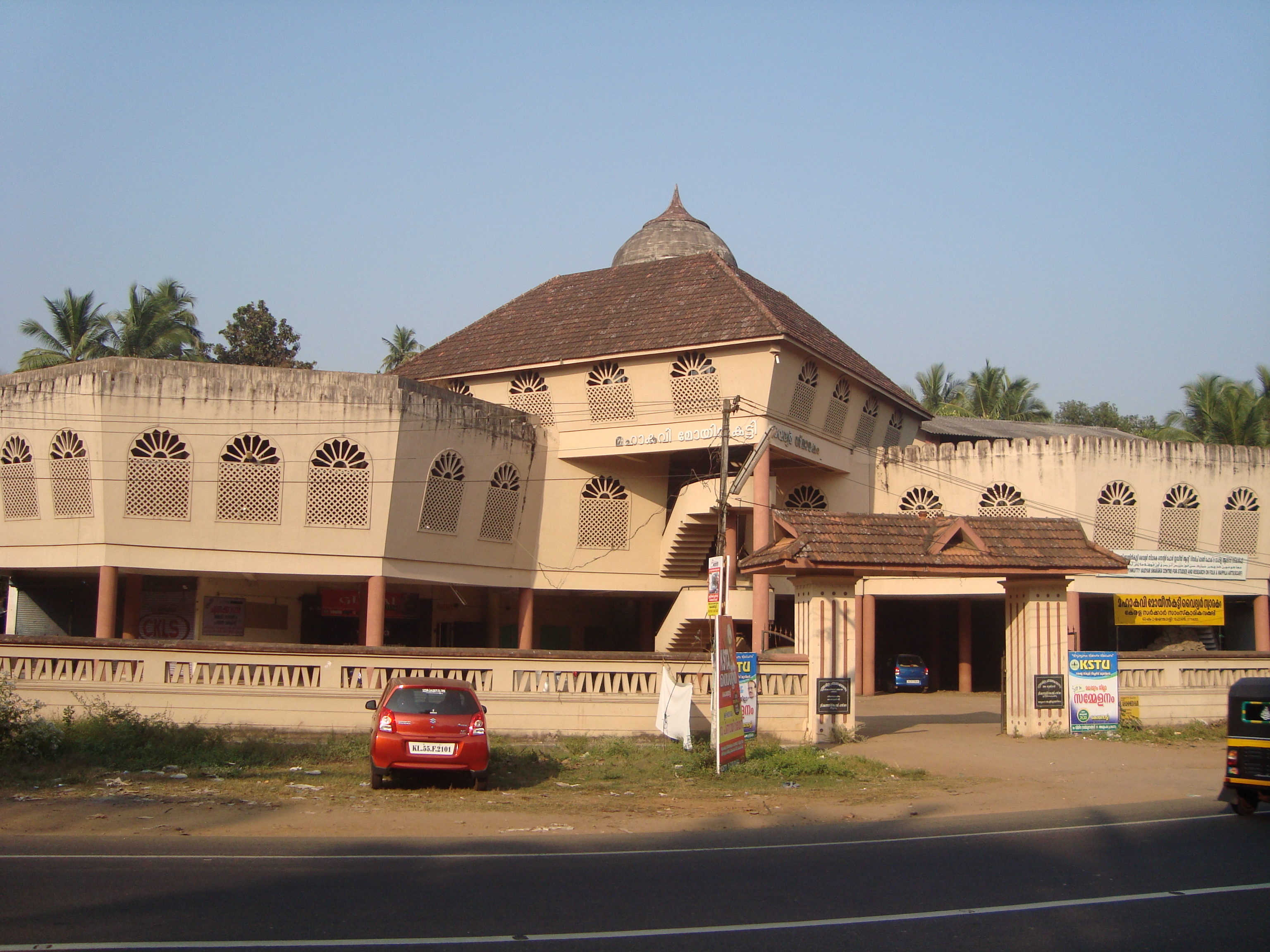
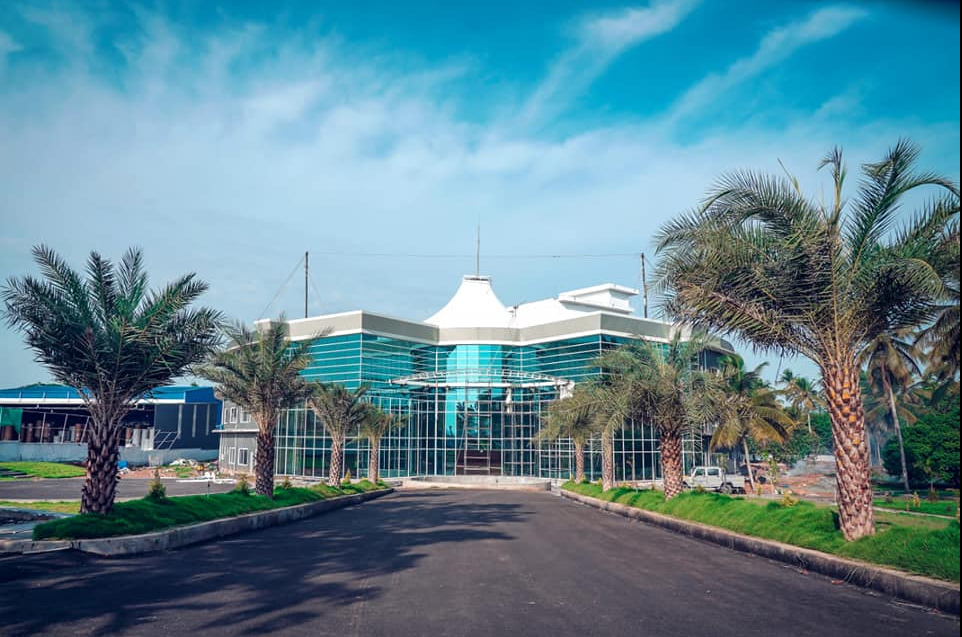
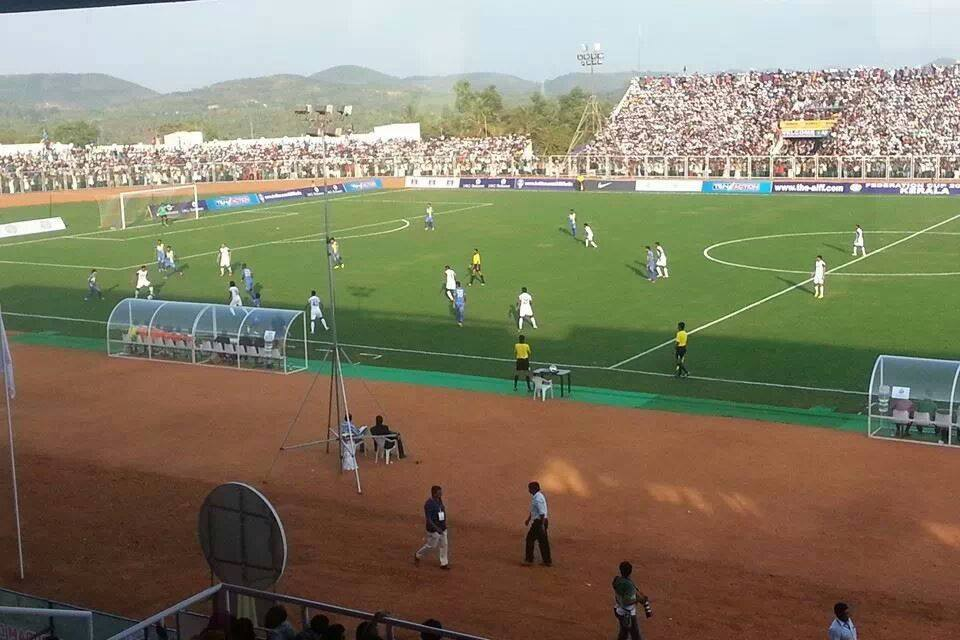
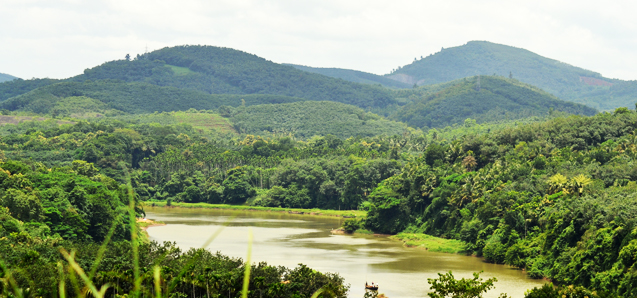
- Clockwise from top: Malappuram Down Hill, Town Hall, Kottakkunnu Hills, Vaidyar Smarakam, AI International College, MDSC Stadium, River view Chaliyar
- Nicknames: Town of Hills, Soccer Capital
- Interactive map of Malappuram
- Coordinates: 11°03′03.6″N 76°04′16.0″E
- Country: India
- State: Kerala
- District: Malappuram
- Established: 1959

Government
  - Type: Municipal council
  - Body: Malappuram Municipality
  - Chairperson: Adv. V. Rinisha (IUML)
  - Vice Chairperson: Jithesh G Anil (INC)

Area
  - City: 58.20 km^{2} (22.47 sq mi)
- Elevation: 38.21 m (125.4 ft)

Population (2011)
  - City: 101,386
  - Density: 1,742/km^{2} (4,512/sq mi)
  - Metro: 2,829,522
- Demonym: Malappuramite
- Time zone: UTC+5:30 (IST)
- PIN: 676505
- Telephone code: +91483xxxxxxx
- Vehicle registration: KL-10 KL-53 KL-54 KL-84 KL-71 KL-65 KL-55
- Official language: Malayalam, English
- Literacy rate: 98.47%
- Climate: Am/Aw (Köppen)
- Precipitation: 3,100 millimetres (120 in)
- Avg. summer temperature: 39 °C (102 °F)
- Avg. winter temperature: 20 °C (68 °F)
- Website: malappurammunicipality.lsgkerala.gov.in

Malappuram (also Malapuram) (Malayalam: [mɐlɐpːurɐm]) is a city in Kerala and the headquarters of the Malappuram district in Kerala, India.

Malappuram is situated 47 km southeast of Calicut and 90 km northwest of Palakkad. It is the first Indian municipal body to provide free Wi-Fi connectivity to its entire residents. Malappuram is also the first Indian municipal body to achieve the International Organization for Standardization certificate. It is also the first complaint-free municipality in the state. The Malappuram metropolitan area is the fourth largest urban agglomeration in Kerala after Kochi, Calicut, and Thrissur urban areas and the 25th largest in India with a total population of 3 million. It is the fastest growing city in the world with a 44.1% urban growth between 2015 and 2020 as per the survey conducted by Economist Intelligence Unit (EIU) based on the urban area growth during January 2020.

As per 2011 census of India, Malappuram city (Malappuram municipality + outgrowths) spread over an area of 58.20 km^{2} (22.47 sq mi) with a population of 101,386 and population density of 1,742/km^{2} (4,510/sq mi). The first municipality in the district formed in 1970, Malappuram serves as the administrative headquarters of Malappuram district. Divided into 40 electoral wards, the municipality has a population density of 2,027 per square kilometre (5,250 per square mile).

== Etymology ==
The term, Malappuram, which means "over the hill" in Malayalam, derives from the geography of Malappuram. The midland area of the district is characterised by several undulating hills such as Arimbra hills, Amminikkadan hills, Oorakam Hill, Cheriyam hills, Pandalur hills, and Chekkunnu hills, all of which lie away from the Western Ghats. However, the coconut-fringed sandy coastal plain is an exception for the general hilly nature.

== History ==
Malappuram was a military and administrative headquarters from ancient times, though several of the ancient history of the town is hardly seen recorded. However, there are some pre-historic relics, particularly rock-cut caves found in some parts of the city like Oorakam, Melmuri, Ponmala, and Vengara. Locality named like Valiyangadi, Kootilangadi, Pallipuram etc. points to the Jain - Buddhist history of Malappuram. Notably, the 1500-year-old Jain Temple above 2000 ft sea level at Oorakam Hill of Malappuram undoubtedly proves the same. During the Sangam period, Eranadan Malappuram was under the Chera Empire. Places like Pattar Kadav, Panakkad, etc. are possibly evolved out of Pattars and Panars having lived there. But no further details are available about the life and culture of the people either during the Sangam age or in the post-Sangam age.

Eranad was ruled by a Samanthan Nair clan known as Eradis, similar to the Vellodis of neighbouring Valluvanad and Nedungadis of Nedunganad. The rulers of Eranad were known by the title Eralppad/Eradi. Archaeological relics found in Malappuram also include the remnants of palaces of the eastern branch of the Zamorin reign. Malappuram was the military headquarters of the Zamorin in the Eranad region. The Zamorins held sway over Malappuram and their chieftain Para Nambi, ruled the area in early days with headquarters at Downhill (Kottappadi), Malappuram. Details of the rulers of erstwhile Malappuram, who were the ancestors of later Zamorins, figure in the Jewish copper plates of Bhaskara Ravi Varman (1000 AD) and in the Kottayam copper plates of Veera Raghava Chakravarthy (1225 AD). The later history of the city is interwoven with the history of Zamorin's rule.

During the colonial era, Malappuram was the headquarters of European and British troops. It later became the headquarters of the Malabar Special Police (M.S.P) formerly known as Malappuram Special Force formed in 1885. The British established the Haigh Barracks on top of the hill of Malappuram, at the bank of the Kadalundi River to station their forces, where once Tipu had a fort. Main Barracks has now been turned into the seat of the district administration as Civil Station, Malappuram. Malappuram was the headquarters of one of the five revenue divisions of erstwhile Malabar district, the others being at Thalassery, Kozhikode, Palakkad and Fort Cochin. Apart from the District Board at Calicut, Malappuram Taluk Board were one of the local boards constituted to manage the affairs in Malabar District along with Thalassery, Palakkad and Mananthavady (Wayanad) with jurisdiction corresponding to the divisional charges of the same names. Inscription of the Malappuram Taluk Board can still be seen on the wall of one of the remaining wells constructed in 1916, over 100 years ago at Valiyangadi in the city. Offices of the Divisional Revenue Magistrate and Assistant Superintendent of Police of Malabar district were located at Malappuram.

=== Kottakkunnu Hill station ===
Kottakkunnu hill station is located in the middle of Malappuram town. The name Kottakunnu comes from the fort built here when the area was the military headquarters of the Calicut rulers Zamorins. Due to the geographical importance of this area, the Malappuram Fort was built here and the town of Malappuram came up around it.

== Geography ==
=== Topography ===
Malappuram is situated in the mid land area of the state. As the name suggests, it is covered with small mountains of lush greenery, bonded with several freshwater streams flowing through the city. Kadalundi Puzha, a major river in Kerala is flowing around the city. Malappuram is one of the few municipalities in the state with a tremendous track record of keeping the city clean. It has been recognised as the second best municipality in upkeeping the cleanliness and health by the state government in 2011 and won second prize for Swachhata Excellence Awards in 2019 by Government of India. Unlike other district headquarters, Malappuram holds a significant position in west–east transit along with north–south. It makes the city accessible for everyone in the district through either National Highways or State Highways.

=== Climate ===
The city has more or less the same climatic conditions prevalent elsewhere in Kerala: a tropical monsoon climate (Köppen Am) that is generally hot and humid in nature. However, the South West Monsoon is usually very heavy. The best season to visit Malappuram is during the months of September to March as the weather conditions are quite pleasant. Owing to its natural habitat, Malappuram is also a city of fresh air. According to the Central Pollution Control Board data for the year 2010, of the 180 cities monitored for SO_{2}, NO_{2} and PM_{10}, Malappuram was one of the two cities which met the criteria of low pollution (i.e. 50% below the standard) for all air pollutants.

Climate data for Malappuram, Kerala
Month	Jan	Feb	Mar	Apr	May	Jun	Jul	Aug	Sep	Oct	Nov	Dec	Year
Mean daily maximum °C (°F)	32.0 (89.6)	32.9 (91.2)	34.0 (93.2)	33.8 (92.8)	32.7 (90.9)	29.3 (84.7)	28.1 (82.6)	28.7 (83.7)	29.7 (85.5)	30.3 (86.5)	31.1 (88.0)	31.4 (88.5)	31.2 (88.2)
Mean daily minimum °C (°F)	21.8 (71.2)	22.8 (73.0)	24.4 (75.9)	25.4 (77.7)	25.1 (77.2)	23.5 (74.3)	22.8 (73.0)	23.3 (73.9)	23.3 (73.9)	23.4 (74.1)	23.1 (73.6)	21.9 (71.4)	23.4 (74.1)
Average rainfall mm (inches)	1 (0.0)	9 (0.4)	16 (0.6)	101 (4.0)	253 (10.0)	666 (26.2)	830 (32.7)	398 (15.7)	233 (9.2)	281 (11.1)	140 (5.5)	24 (0.9)	2,952 (116.3)

== Demographics ==
According to the 2011 Indian Census, town had a total population of 101,386, of which 48,957 were males and 52,429 were females. The population within the age range of 0 to 6 years was 14,629. The Scheduled Castes and Scheduled Tribes population was 5,323 and 77 respectively. Malappuram had 19785 households in 2011. Muslims form 74.83% of the town's population while Hindus and Christian form the remaining 25%.

== Civic administration ==
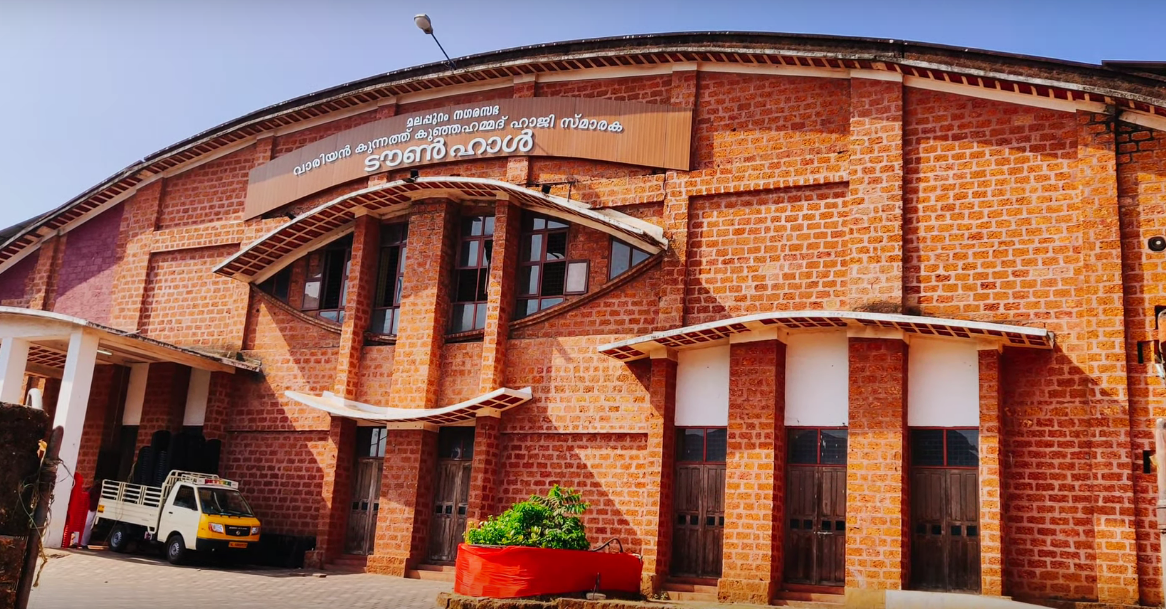
Malappuram townhall

Municipality officials
Chairperson	Adv. V. Rinisha (IUML)
Vice Chairperson	Jithesh G Anil (INC)
Elected representatives
Member of Legislative Assembly (Malappuram LAC)	P. Ubaidulla (IUML)
Member of Parliament (Malappuram HPC)	E. T. Mohammed Basheer (IUML)

The town is governed by the Malappuram Municipality, headed by a municipal chairperson. For administrative purposes, the city is divided into 40 wards, from which the members of the municipal council are elected for five years. The chairperson and deputy chairperson are elected by the councillors of the 40 wards. The municipality is currently governed by the United Democratic Front (UDF), with V. Rinisha of the Indian Union Muslim League (IUML) serving as Chairperson and Jithesh G. Anil of the Indian National Congress (INC) as Vice Chairperson since 2025. The functions of the municipality are divided into six departments: General Administration, Engineering, Revenue, Health, City Planning, and Welfare. All these departments function under the control of the Municipal Secretary, who is the administrative head.

Being the district headquarters city, Malappuram comprises the Civil Station area which consists of administrative and other Government offices of the district such as District Collectorate, District Treasury, Regional Transport Office, PWD Division Office, District Panchayat Office, Town planning Office, Text depot, District Medical office etc. to name a few. The city also hosts several important district-level offices, including the District Police Office, the Malabar Special Police headquarters, and the office of the Deputy Director of Education, among others.

=== Malappuram Municipality Election 2020 ===
S.No.	Alliance	Symbol	Number of Councillors
01	UDF		25
02	LDF		14
03	Independents		01

=== Police ===
The Malappuram Police Station, established in 1927, is responsible for law enforcement in the city and its surrounding suburbs. Its jurisdiction covers Malappuram, Melmuri, Kodoor, Koottilangadi, Ponmala, and Panakkad revenue villages. The limits of the police station include Malappuram Municipality, Koottilangadi Panchayat, Kodur Panchayat, and Ponmala Panchayat. Law and order in the region is maintained under the Malappuram subdivision of the Kerala Police, headed by a Deputy Superintendent of Police. The Malappuram police subdivision consists area of Eranad taluk; includes Malappuram, Vengara, Manjeri, and Kottakkal police stations, along with traffic and vanitha units.

Apart from these, there is 24/7 highway police patrol as well as a special pink patrol (Dial-1515) under Malappuram police division catering to women.

Malappuram also hosts the office of the District Police Chief and several special units, including the District Crime Branch, Special Branch, Crime Records Bureau, Narcotics Cell, District Headquarters Camp, and the Malabar Special Police, one of the oldest armed police battalions in the state.

=== Proposed Malappuram Municipal Corporation ===
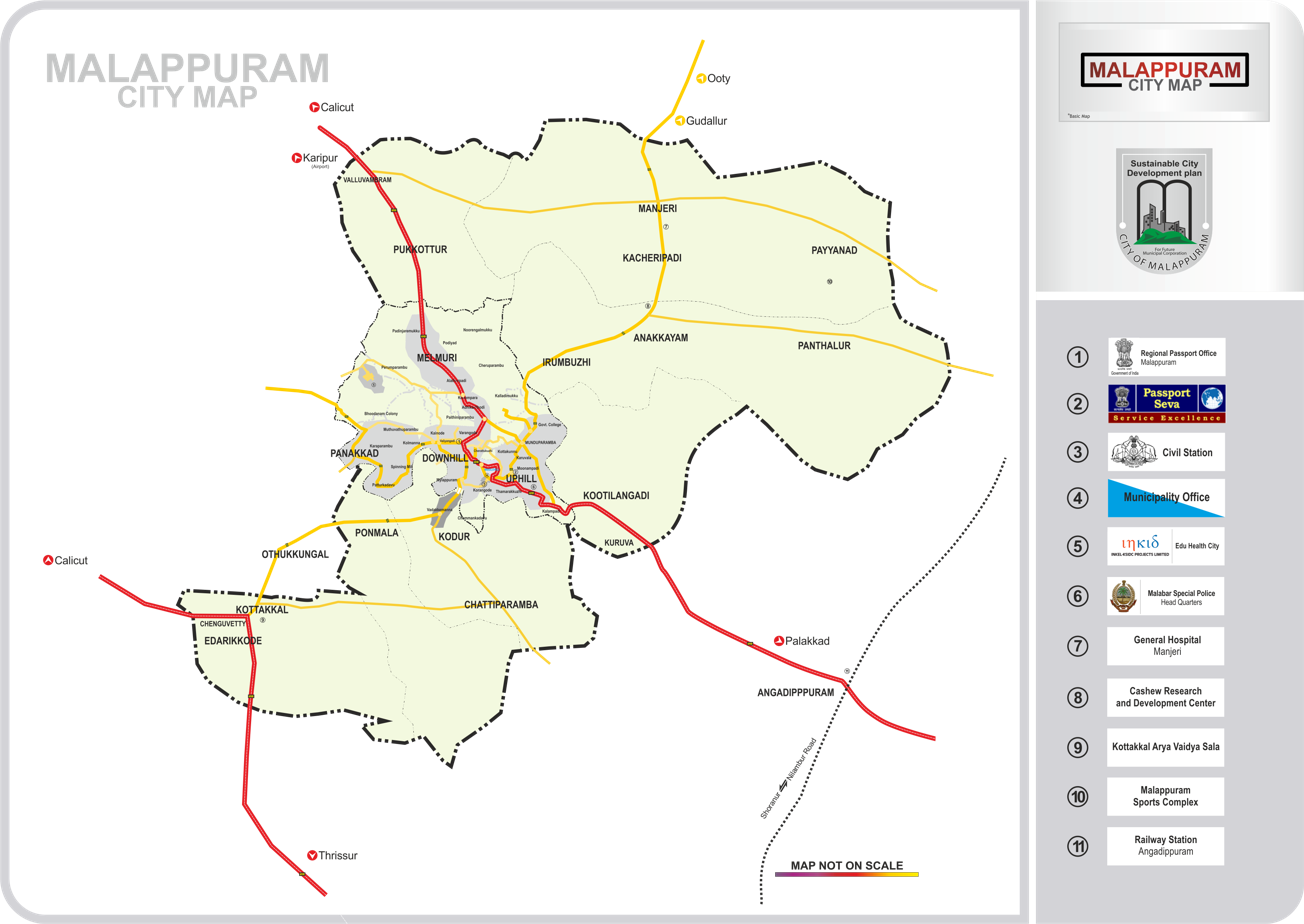
Malappuram City Map showing proposed corporation limit

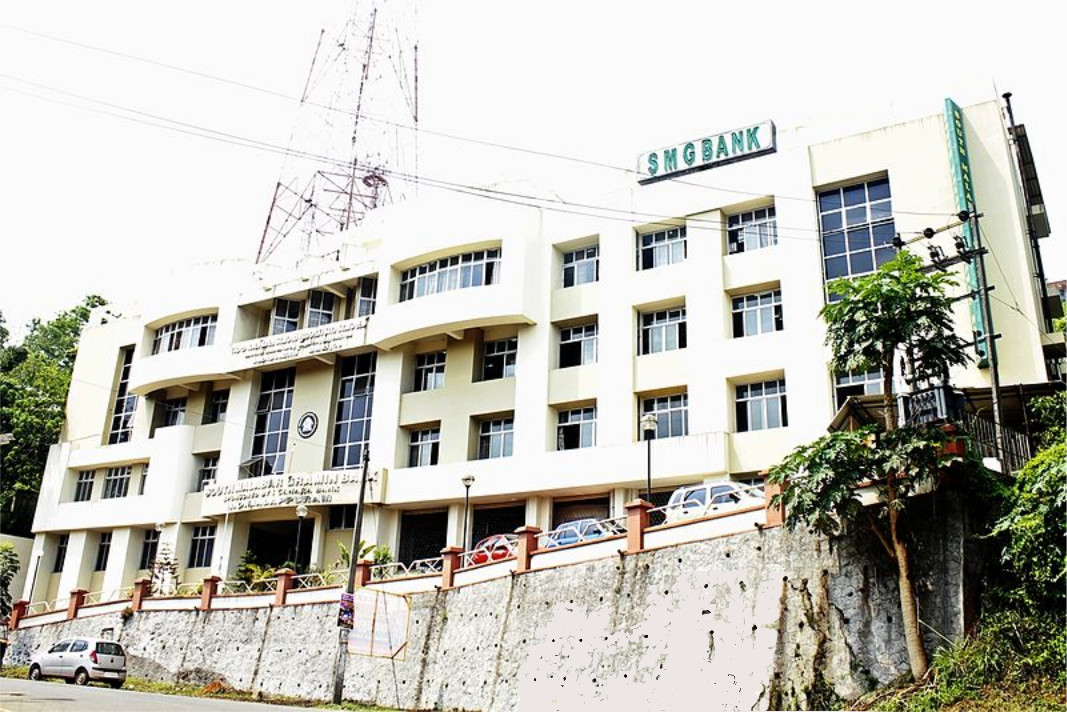
The headquarters of Kerala Gramin Bank

Malappuram is the only city in Kerala with a million-plus urban agglomeration that is yet to be upgraded to a Municipal Corporation. However, there is a demand to upgrade the Malappuram Municipality into a Municipal Corporation by incorporating the local bodies in the Greater Malappuram region. The proposed Malappuram Municipal Corporation comprises:

- Malappuram Municipality
- Manjeri Municipality
- Anakkayam, a suburban panchayat
- Pookkottur, a suburban panchayat
- Trikkalangode, a suburban panchayat
- Morayur, a suburban panchayat
- Kodur, a suburban panchayat
- Koottilangadi, a suburban panchayat

There are also suggestions to include the following local bodies in Malappuram Municipal Corporation:

- Kottakkal Municipality
- Ponmala
- Othukkungal
- Oorakam
- Kannamangalam
- Parappur
- Vengara
- Makaraparamba

== Education ==
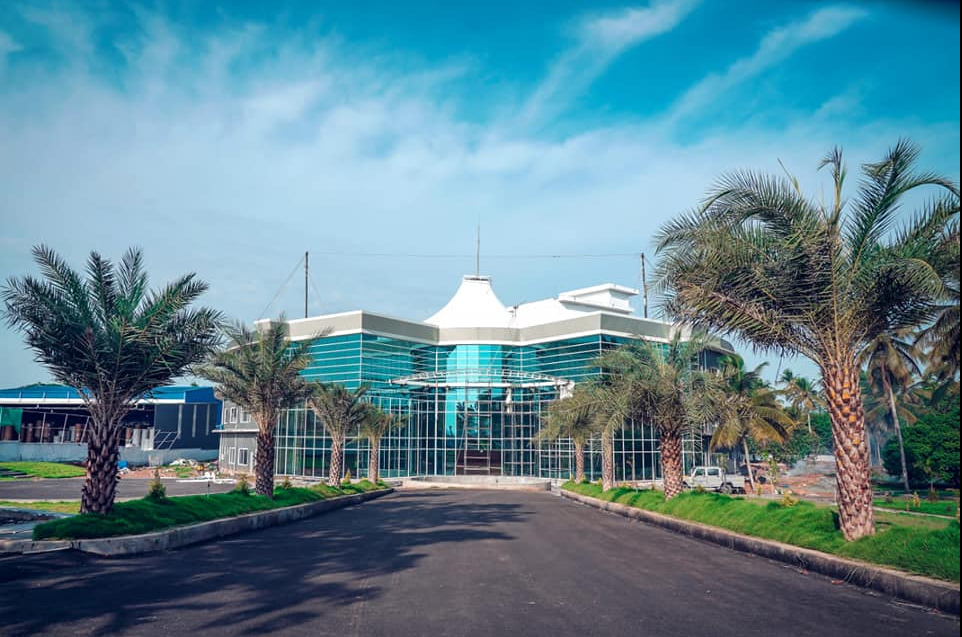
AI International College, Malappuram

The town has several educational institutions from the school level to higher education. These include Kendriya Vidyalaya, Malappuram, Jawahar Navodaya Vidyalaya, Malappuram, and Malabar Special Police HSS. Government College, Malappuram, which is the oldest college in the district started in 1972, College of Applied Science Malappuram started in 1987 and Govt. College for Women, Malappuram started in the year 2015, serve the higher educational purpose. Govt. TTI, Malappuram, MCT TTI and Fazfari TTI are teacher training institutes. MCT College of Legal Studies, one of the two law colleges in the district is located in the city. The Regional Directorate of Higher Secondary Education and Regional Office (Malabar) of State Open School are located in the city inside the Civil Station.

The district plays a significant role in the higher education sector of the state. It is home to two of the main universities in the state- the University of Calicut centered at Tenhipalam which was established in 1968 as the second university in Kerala, and the Thunchath Ezhuthachan Malayalam University centered at Tirur which was established in the year 2012. AMU Malappuram Campus, one of the three off-campus centres of Aligarh Muslim University (AMU) is situated in Cherukara, which was established by the AMU in 2010. An off-campus of the English and Foreign Languages University functions at Panakkad. The district is also home to a subcentre of Kerala Agricultural University at Thavanur, and a subcentre of Sree Sankaracharya University of Sanskrit at Tirunavaya. The headquarters of Darul Huda Islamic University is at Chemmad, Tirurangadi. INKEL Greens at Malappuram provides an educational zone with the industrial zone. Eranad Knowledge City at Manjeri is a first of its kind project in the state. The MES College of Engineering, Kuttippuram, is the first established engineering college under the self financing sector in Kerala, an urban campus that extends more than a mile (1.6 km) alongside the Bharathappuzha river. The KCAET at Thavanur established in 1963, is the only agricultural engineering institute in the state. The Govt. Ayurveda Research Institute for Mental Disease at Pottippara near Kottakkal is the only government Ayurvedic mental hospital in Kerala. It is also the first of its type under the public sector in the country. The Government of Kerala has proposed to establish one more university, the Ayurveda University, at Kottakkal.

The district has the most schools as well as the most number of students in Kerala as per the school statistics of 2019–20. There are 898 Lower primary schools, 363 Upper primary schools, Besides these, there are 120 CBSE schools and 3 ICSE schools.

== Media ==
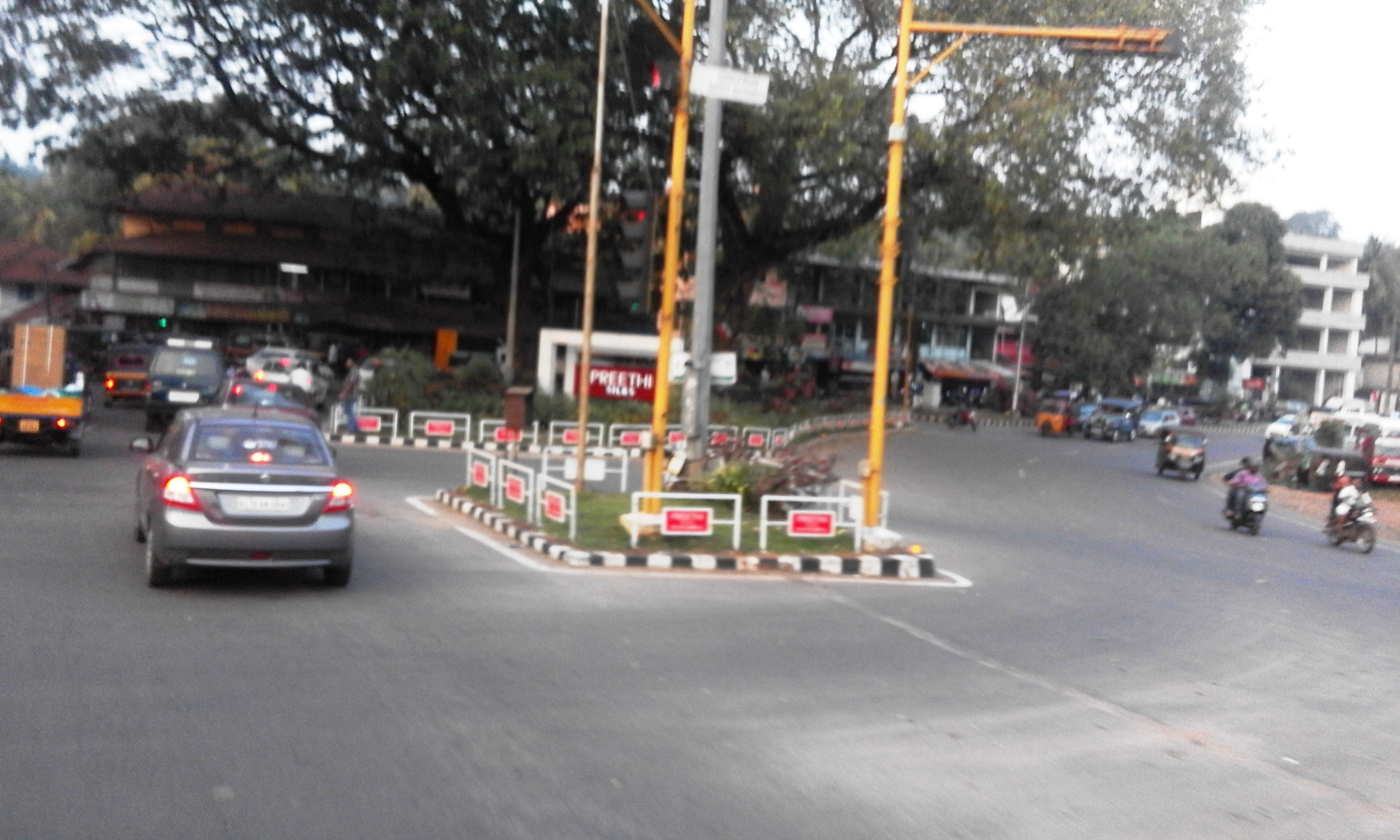
A junction in the town

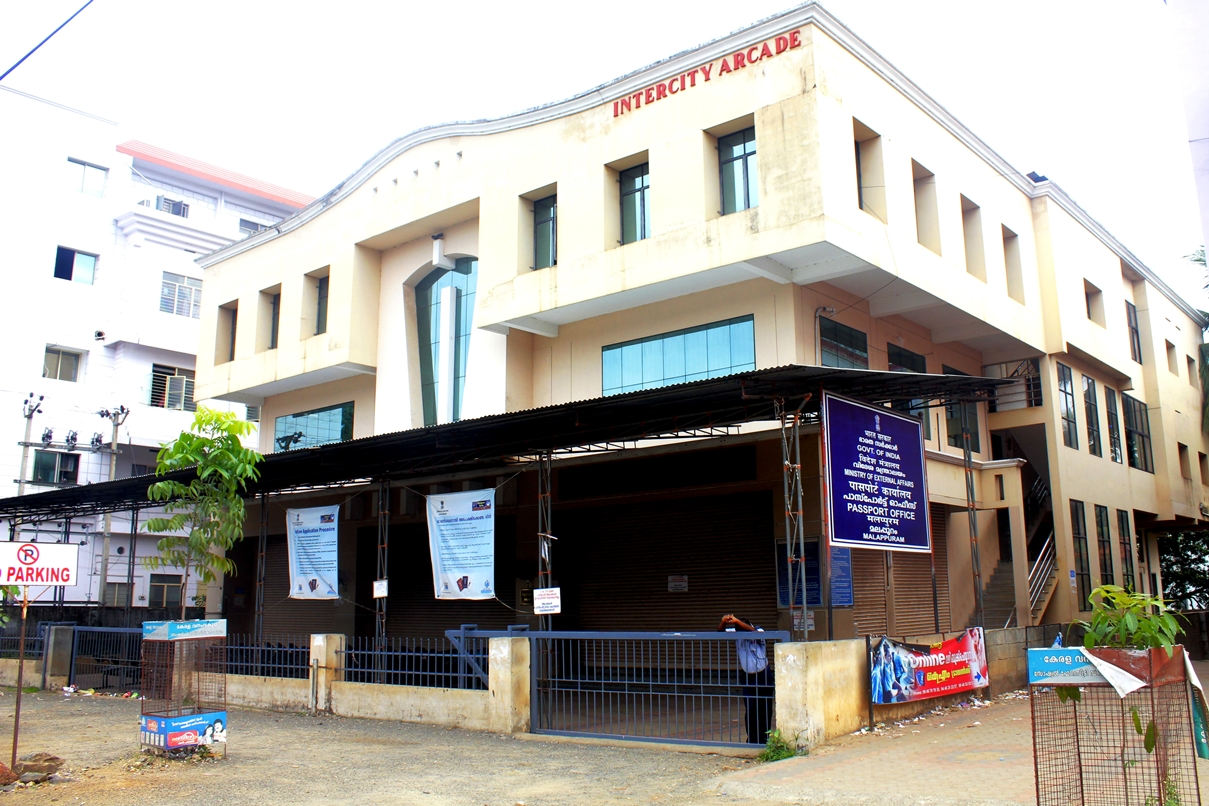
Passport office

Malayala Manorama, Mathrubhumi, Madhyamam, Chandrika, Deshabhimani, Suprabhaatham dailies have their printing centres in and around the city. The Hindu has an edition and printing press at Malappuram. A few periodicals-monthlies, fortnightlies and weeklies mostly devoted to religion and culture are also published. Almost all Malayalam channels and newspapers have their bureau at Up Hill. There are some local cable TV channels including (MCV), (ACV) etc. Malappuram Press Club is also situated at UP Hill adjacent to Municipal Town Hall. Doordarshan has its major relay station in the district at Malappuram. Government of India's Prasarbharati National Public Service Broadcaster has FM station in the district, broadcasting on 102.7 Mhtz. Even without any private FM stations, Malappuram is in the top ten towns with the highest radio listenership in India. There is a multiplex and four standalone cinema halls that screen movies in Malayalam, Tamil, English and Hindi. Rasmi Film Society, one of Kerala's oldest film forums is from Malappuram. The 72nd International film festival of Malappuram was conducted in March 2011. The government of India's Prasar Bharati National Public Service Broadcaster has an FM station in the district (AIR Manjeri FM), broadcasting on 102.7 Mhtz. Even without any private FM stations, Malappuram, Ponnani, and Tirur, are also part of the ten towns with the highest radio listenership in India.

== Sports ==
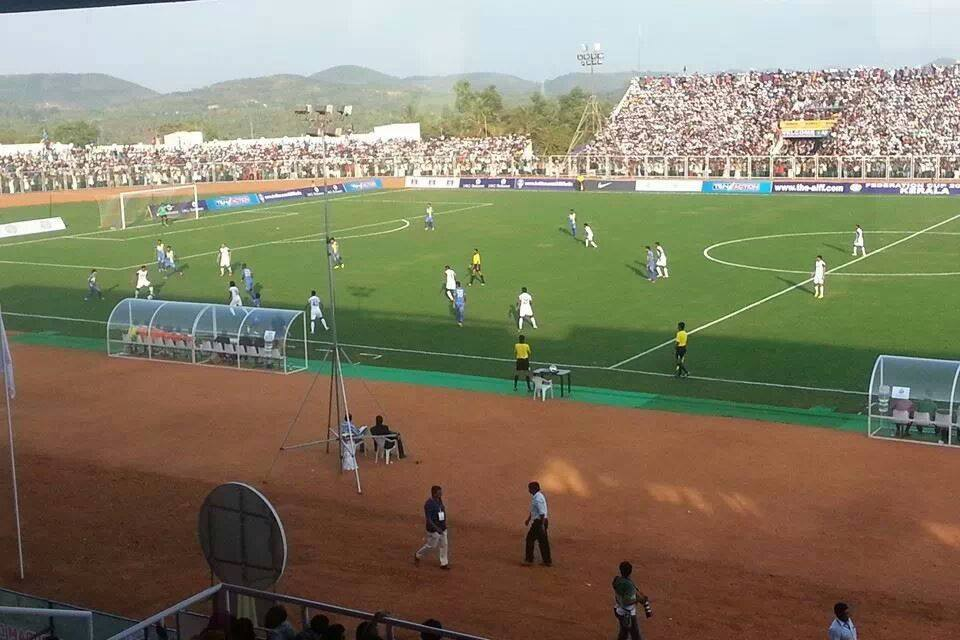
MDSC Stadium during 2013–14 Indian Federation Cup

Like elsewhere in Kerala, football is arguably the most popular sport among the locals. The Kottappadi Football Stadium is located right at the heart of Malappuram. The Malappuram District Sports Complex Stadium is situated at Payyanad in Manjeri. It was selected as one of two stadiums, along with the Jawaharlal Nehru Stadium, to host the group stages of the 2013–14 Indian Federation Cup. The stadium hosted groups B and D. It also hosted the 2023 Indian Super Cup along with the EMS Stadium. Malabar Special Police HSS is one of the best achievers in the Indian inter-school football tournaments. It is also the runner-up team of the 53rd and 55th Subroto Cup international inter-school football tournaments held in Delhi.

== Notable people ==
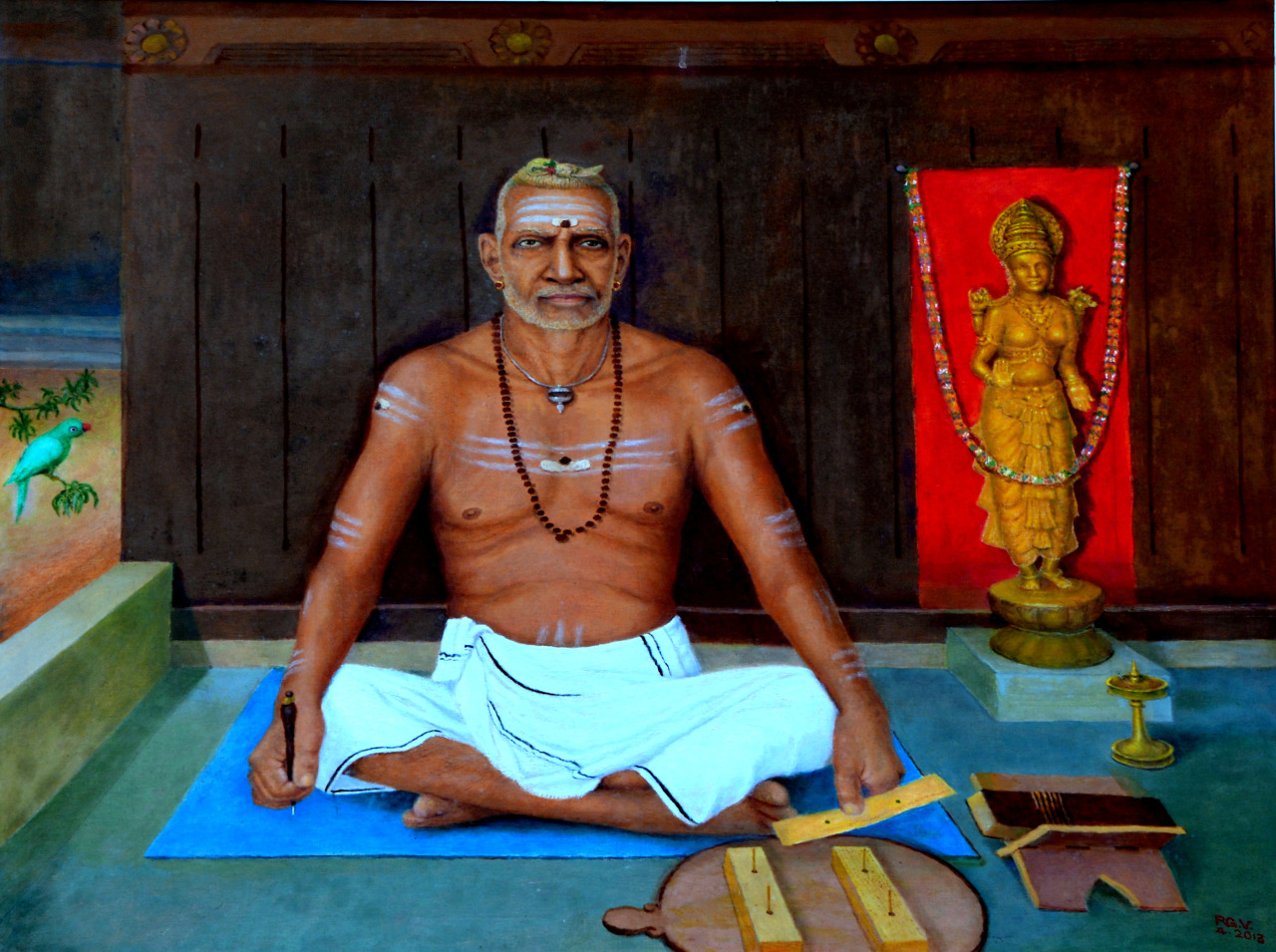
Thunchath Ezhuthachan who is regarded as father of modern Malayalam language was born in Malapuram

- Kurukkoli Moideen - Politician, MLA.
- A. Vijayaraghavan - Former member of Rajya Sabha and the state secretary of CPI(M).
- A. P. Anil Kumar - Former minister of Kerala.
- A. R. Raja Raja Varma - Malayalam poet and grammatician known as Kerala Panini (belongs to Parappanad royal family).
- Abdul Nediyodath - footballer.
- Abdurahiman Randathani - politician
- Achyutha Pisharadi - a Sanskrit grammarian, astronomer and mathematician.
- Adil Ibrahim - actor
- Ahmad Kutty - North American Islamic scholar.
- Ajijesh Pachat - Malayalam novelist, short story writer and columnist.
- Akkitham Achuthan Namboothiri - Malayalam poet and essayist. (Born at Kumaranellur, a border village between Malappuram and Palakkad districts. He was a writer from the Ponnani Kalari)
- Akkitham Narayanan - painter.
- Ammu Swaminathan - Independence activist and a member of Constituent Assembly of India.
- Anas Edathodika - Indian professional footballer.
- Aneesh G. Menon - Actor.
- Anikha - Actress.
- Aparna Nair - Actress.
- Arjun Jayaraj - Professional footballer.
- Artist Namboothiri - painter.
- Aryadan Muhammed - Former minister of Kerala.
- Aryadan Shoukath - Indian film producer.
- Ashique Kuruniyan - Indian professional footballer.
- Asif Saheer - Indian soccer player.
- Azad Moopen - Doctor and Philanthropist.
- B. M. Kutty - Journalist and Activist.
- Balamani Amma - Writer of Malayalam literature.
- C. Karunakara Menon - Journalist and Politician.
- C. Radhakrishnan - Writer and film director of Malayalam language.
- C. N. Ahmad Moulavi - Indian writer of Malayalam literature.
- Chakkeeri Ahemed Kutty - Former minister of Kerala and former speaker of Kerala Legislative Assembly.
- Chalilakath Kunahmed Haji - Social reformer.
- Cherukad Govinda Pisharody - Malayalam playwright, Novelist, Poet, and Political activist.
- Damodara - Astronomer-mathematician.
- Deepu Pradeep - Scriptwriter.
- Devdutt Padikkal - Indian cricketer.
- Dhanish Karthik - Actor.
- Dileep K. Nair - Educationist, skill development campaigner, social activist, and publisher.
- E. Harikumar - Malayalam novelist and short story writer.
- E. Moidu Moulavi - Indian freedom fighter, and an Islamic scholar.
- E. Sreedharan - Metroman of India.
- E. K. Imbichi Bava - Politician.
- E. M. S. Namboodiripad - The first Chief Minister of Kerala and the founder of CPI(M).
- E. T. Mohammed Basheer - Former minister of Kerala and Member of Lok Sabha.
- Edasseri Govindan Nair - Poet.
- Elamaram Kareem - Former minister of Kerala and Member of Rajya Sabha.
- Faisal Kutty - Lawyer, academic, writer, public speaker, and human rights activist.
- Gopinath Muthukad - magician, and motivational speaker.
- Govinda Bhattathiri - Indian astrologer and astronomer.
- Hari Nair - Cinematographer.
- Hemanth Menon - Actor.
- Hanumankind- An Indian rapper.
- Indrajith Sukumaran - film actor and playback singer.
- Nida Anjum Chelat - Indian equestrian.
- Iqbal Kuttippuram - Screenwriter and homoeopathic physician.
- Jayasree Kalathil - Writer, translator, mental health researcher, and activist.
- K. Abdurahman - Founder of Chaliyar movement.
- K. Avukader Kutty Naha - Former deputy chief minister of Kerala.
- K. C. S. Paniker - was a metaphysical and abstract painter.
- K. C. Manavedan Raja - Indian aristocrat.
- K. M. Asif - Cricketer.
- K. M. Maulavi - Indian freedom fighter, social reformer and the founding vice-president of IUML Malabar district committee.
- K. P. A. Majeed - Former Chief Whip of the Government of Kerala.
- K. P. Ramanunni - Novelist and Short-story writer.
- K. T. Irfan - Athlete.
- K. T. Jaleel - Minister of Kerala.
- K. T. Muhammed- Malayalam playwright and screenwriter.
- K. V. Rabiya - Social worker.
- K Ramachandran Master - Teacher
- K. V. Ramakrishnan - Malayalam–language poet and journalist.
- Kadavanad Kuttikrishnan - Malayalam poet and journalist.
- Kalamandalam Kalyanikutty Amma - Resurrector of Mohiniyattam.
- Kamala Surayya - Writer of Malayalam literature.
- Kerala Varma Valiya Koil Thampuran - Malayalam poet and translator, also known as Kalidasa of Kerala (belongs to Parappanad royal family).
- Krishnachandran - Actor, Dubbing artist, and Playback singer.
- Kuttikrishna Marar - Essayist and literary critic of Malayalam literature.
- Lakshmi Sahgal - a revolutionary of the Indian independence movement, an officer of the Indian National Army, and the Minister of Women's Affairs in the Azad Hind government.
- M. Govindan - Writer of Malayalam literature.
- M. Swaraj - Politician.
- M. G. S. Narayanan - Historian, and academic and political commentator.
- M. K. Vellodi - Former Indian diplomat.
- M. M. Akbar - Islamic scholar, and an expert in comparative religion.
- M. P. Abdussamad Samadani - Former member of Rajya Sabha.
- M. P. M. Ahammed Kurikkal - Former minister of Kerala.
- M. P. M. Menon - Indian diplomat, ambassador to several countries.
- M. T. Vasudevan Nair - Malayalam author, screenplay writer and film director. (Born at Kudallur, a border village between Malappuram and Palakkad districts. He is a writer from the Ponnani Kalari.)
- Malayath Appunni - Malayalam language poet and children's writer.
- Manjalamkuzhi Ali - Former minister of Kerala.
- Mankada Ravi Varma - Cinematographer and Director.
- Manorama Thampuratti - was a Sanskrit writer.
- Mashoor Shereef - Professional footballer.
- Melattur Sahadevan - Carnatic music vocalist.
- Melpathur Narayana Bhattathiri - Mathematical linguist.
- Mohammed Irshad - Professional footballer.
- Mohamed Salah - Footballer.
- Mohanakrishnan Kaladi - Malayalam poet.
- Moyinkutty Vaidyar - Mappila pattu poet.
- Mrinalini Sarabhai - Indian classical dancer.
- Muhammad Musthafa - Actor and Director.
- Muhsin Parari - Director, Writer, and Lyricist.
- Nalakath Soopy - Former minister of Kerala.
- Nalapat Narayana Menon - Writer of Malayalam literature.
- Nandanar - Writer of Malayalam literature.
- Nilambur Ayisha - Actress in the Malayalam film industry and drama.
- Nilambur Balan - Malayalam actor.
- Nirupama Rao - Former foreign secretary of India.
- P. Sreeramakrishnan - current speaker of Kerala Legislative Assembly.
- P. Surendran - Writer, Columnist, art critic, and a philanthropist.
- P. K. Abdu Rabb - Former minister of Kerala.
- P. K. Kunhalikutty - Former minister of Kerala.
- P. K. Warrier - Ayurvedic physician and a Padma Bhushan winner.
- P. P. Ramachandran - Malayalam poet.
- P. V. Abdul Wahab - Businessman, and a member of Rajya Sabha.
- Paloli Mohammed Kutty - Former minister of Kerala.
- Parameshvara - Indian mathematician and astronomer.
- Parvathy Jayadevan - Playback singer.
- Poonthanam Nambudiri - Malayalam poet.
- Premji - Social reformer, Cultural leader, and Actor.
- Prithviraj Sukumaran - actor, director, producer, playback singer, and distributor.
- Pulapre Balakrishnan - Economist and Educationalist.
- Pulikkottil Hyder - Mappila pattu poet.
- Rajeev Nair - Writer, Lyricist, and Producer.
- Ranjith Padinhateeri - Biological physicist and a professor.
- Rashin Rahman - Actor.
- Raja Ravi Varma - Indian painter and artist (belongs to Parappanad royal family).
- Ravi Menon - Actor.
- Ravi Vallathol - Actor.
- Rinshad Reera - Student Activist.
- Salam Bappu - Film director.
- Salman Kalliyath - Indian professional footballer.
- Sangita Madhavan Nair - Actress.
- Sankaran Embranthiri - Kathakali musician.
- Savithri Rajeevan - Indian poet, short story writer, and painter.
- Sayyid Sanaullah Makti Tangal - Social reformer.
- Shahabaz Aman - Playback singer and Composer.
- Shanavas K Bavakutty - Film director.
- Shweta Menon - Model, Actress, and Television anchor.
- Sithara - Playback singer, Composer, and an occasional actor.
- Sooraj Thelakkad - An actor.
- Sukumaran - Film actor and producer.
- Sunny Wayne - Film actor (stayed during higher education).
- Syed Muhammedali Shihab Thangal - Religious leader and politician.
- T. A. Razzaq - Screenwriter.
- T. K. Hamza - Former minister of Kerala.
- T. K. Padmini - Indian painter.
- T. M. Nair - Political activist of Dravidian movement.
- Thunchaththu Ezhuthachan- Father of Malayalam language.
- Tirur Nambissan - Kathakali singer.
- U. A. Beeran - Former minister of Kerala.
- U. Sharaf Ali - Former Indian International football player.
- Unni Menon - Playback singer.
- Uroob - Writer of Malayalam literature.
- V. C. Balakrishna Panicker - Indian poet and writer.
- V. T. Bhattathiripad - Social reformer (hailed from erstwhile Ponnani taluk).
- Vaidyaratnam P. S. Warrier - Ayurvedic physician.
- Vaidyaratnam Triprangode Moossad - Ayurvedic physician.
- Vallathol Narayana Menon - Malayalam poet.
- Variyan Kunnathu Kunjahammed Haji - Indian Freedom Fighter.
- Vazhenkada Kunchu Nair - Kathakali master and a Padma Shri winner.
- Vazhenkada Vijayan - Retired principal of Kerala Kalamandalam.
- Veliyankode Umar Khasi - Freedom fighter and poet.
- Vinay Govind - Indian film director.
- Zainuddin Makhdoom II - The author of Tuhfat Ul Mujahideen.
- Zakariya Mohammed - Film director, screenwriter, and actor.
- Zakeer Mundampara - Footballer.

== See also ==
- Administration of Malappuram
- Education in Malappuram
- History of Malappuram
- List of people from Malappuram
- Transportation in Malappuram
- Malappuram metropolitan area
- Malappuram district
- Largest Indian cities by GDP
