= Oorakam Hill =

Mountain in Kerala, India

- Urakam Hill
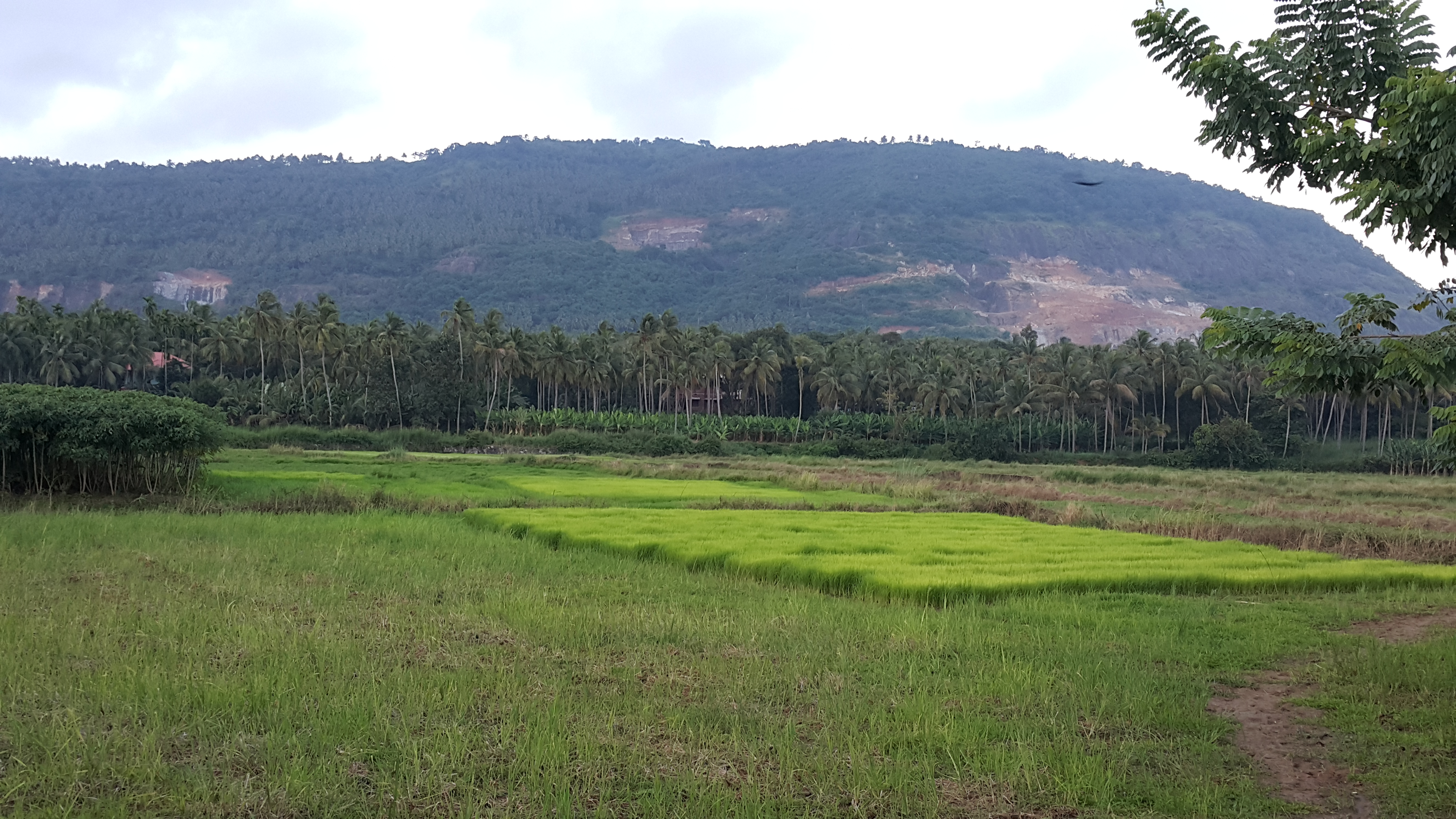
- Oorakam Hill, Malappuram district, Keralam, India

Highest point
- Elevation: 486.43 m (1,595.9 ft)
- Coordinates: 11.0882°N 76.0094°E

Naming
- Language of name: Malayalam

Geography
- Location within Kerala
- Location: Malappuram district, Keralam, India
- Country: India
- State: Keralam
- District: Malappuram district

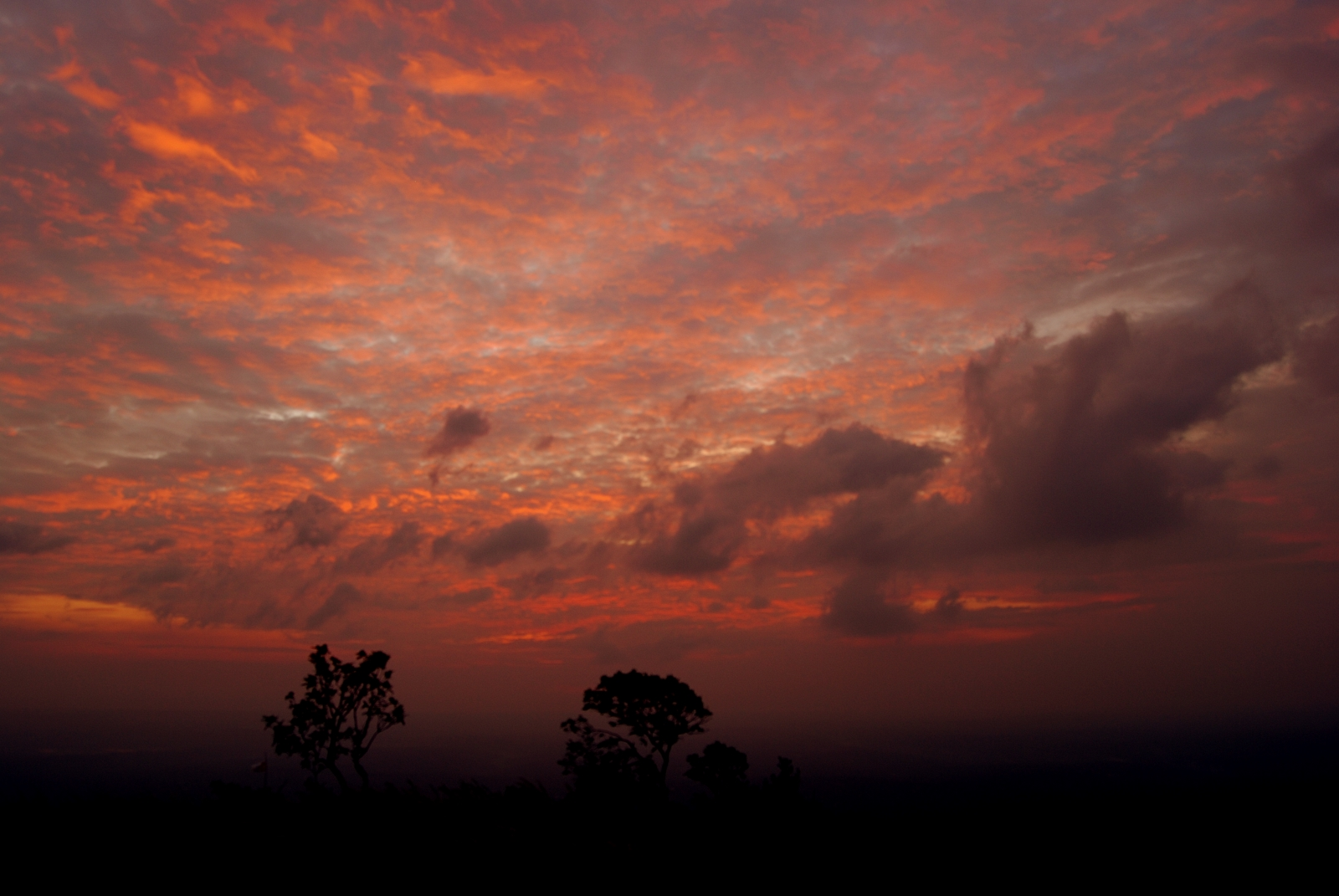
Oorakam Mala

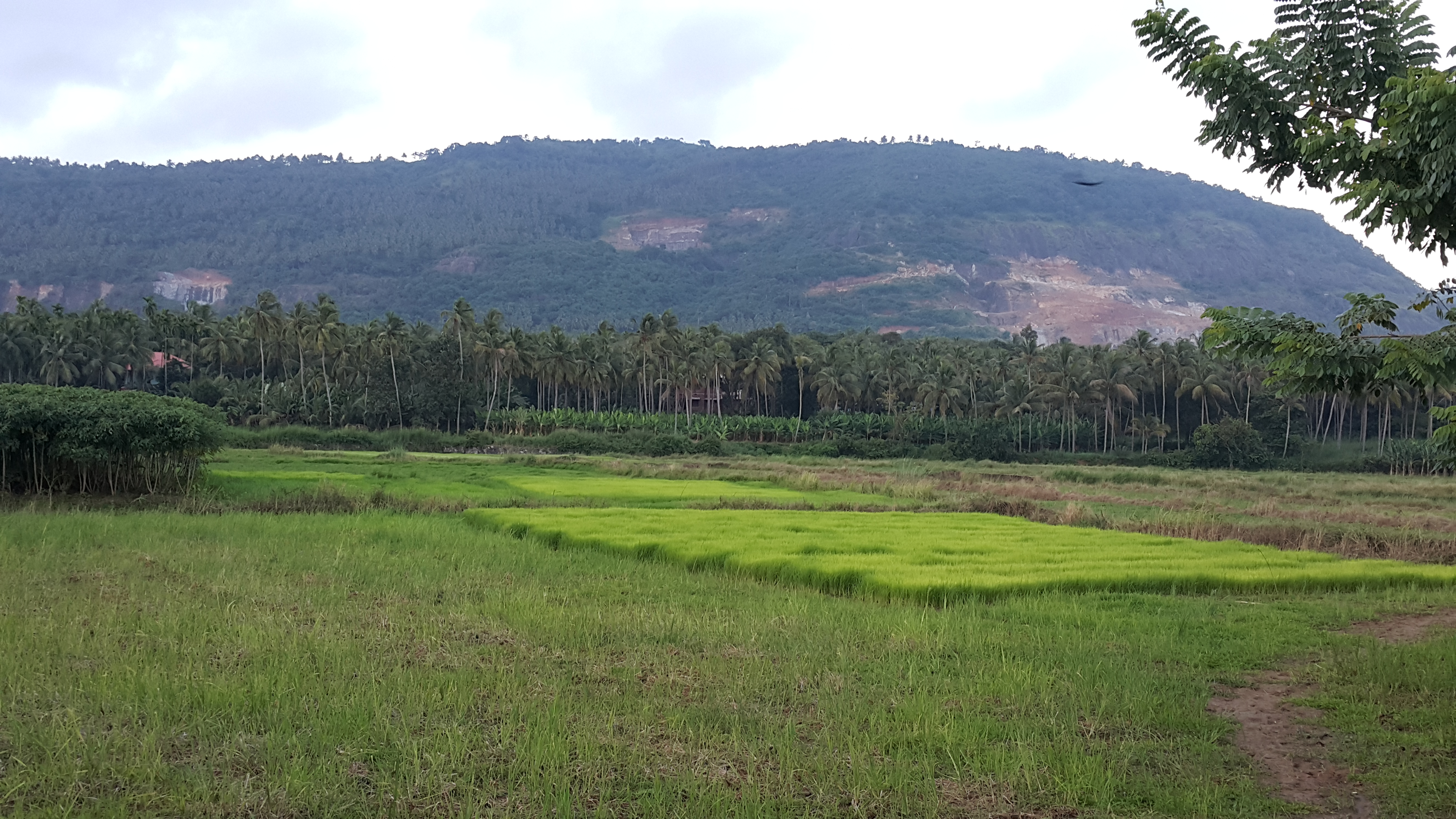
A view of Oorakam hills from Kilinakode

Oorakam Mala is a mount near Malappuram, Kerala, India.

== Location ==
It is in the Oorakam village, bordering the Nediyiruppu and Kannamangalam villages. It is visible from the Malappuram-Parappanangadi state highway between Vengara and Panakkad and is around 6 km to the peak of the mount from the highway. There is a Jain temple at the top of the mountain, which is around 2000 years old.
