= Kannamangalam =

Kannamangalam may refer to:

- Kannamangalam, Malappuram, a panchayath in Malappuram District, Kerala state, India
- Kannamangalam (Alappuzha), a village in Kerala state, India
- Kannamangalam (Sivaganga district), a village in Tamilnadu state, India
