= Shylan =

Indian writer

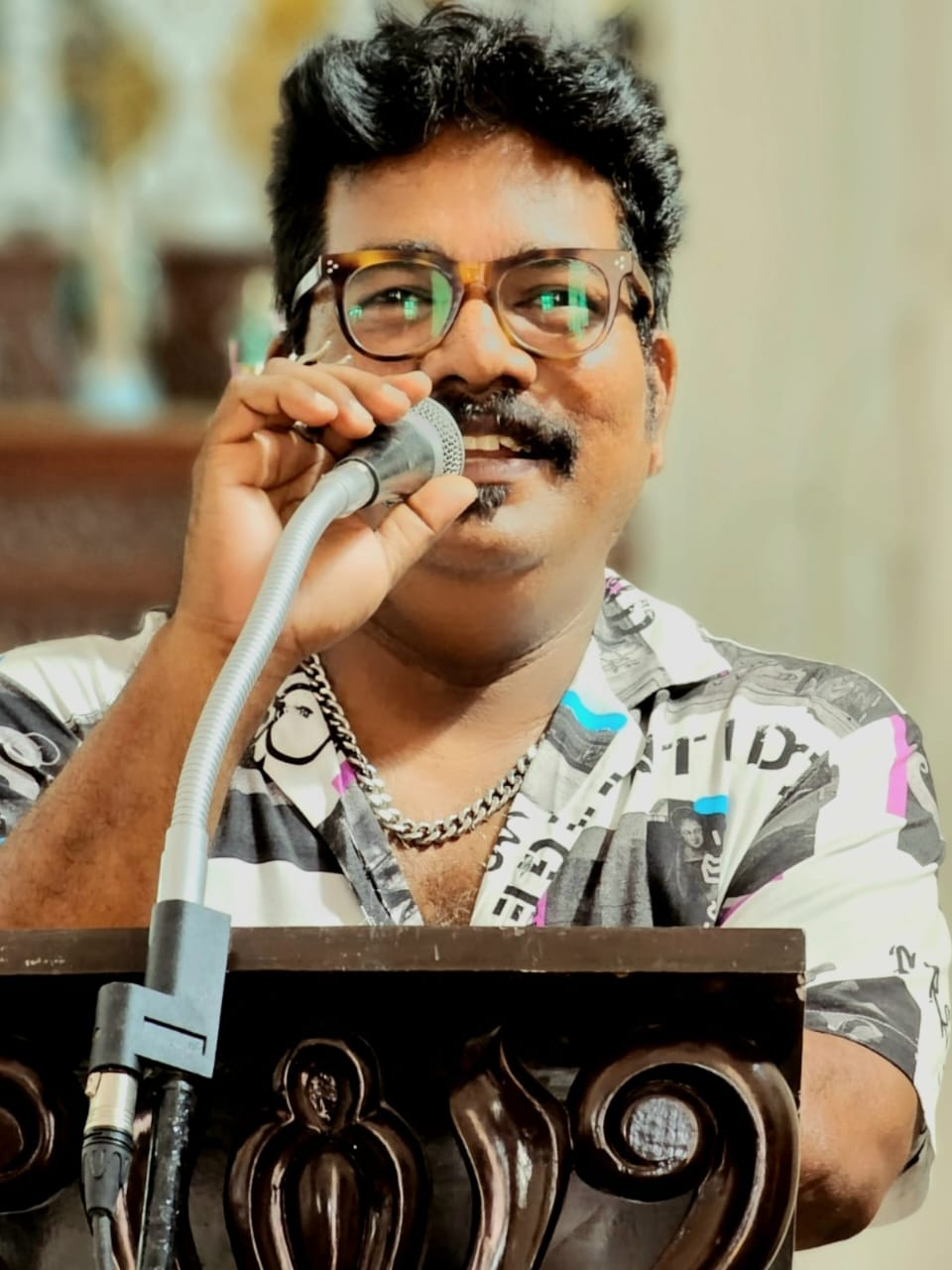
- Shylan in 2023
- Born: 29 March 1975 (age 51); Malappuram, Kerala, India
- Education: NSS College, Manjeri
- Occupations: poet, short story writer, film critic, columnist
- Writing career
- Language: Malayalam
- Years active: 2003–present
- Notable works: Rashtramee Mamsa; Nooru Nooru Yatragal; Vettaikkaran

Shylan Sailendrakumar (born 29 March 1975), known by his pen name Shylan, is a Malayalam language poet from Malappuram, Kerala, India. He is also a film critic, who has been reviewing movies for online publications.

== Life and career ==
Shylan was born on 29 March 1975 in Malappuram, Kerala. He completed his education from NSS College, Manjeri. Shylan started writing in some periodicals in Malayalam in the early 2000s. His first book titled Nishkasithante Easter was published in 2003. Shylan was noticedfor bringing new styles and vocabularies in Malayalam poems. Vettaikkaran, which is a collection of poems written by Shylan was published in 2017. In 2022, 'Rashtramee Mamsa', another collection of poems by Shylan was published. This was critically acclaimed for highlighting the contemporary issues in India. The same year, Shylan's first travelogue titled as Nooru Nooru Yatragal was published at the Sharjah International book festival.

== Bibliography ==
- Love eXXXperiences of a scoundrel poet -2010
- Rashtramee_maamsa -2022
- Nooru Nooru Yathrakal -2022

== Awards ==
- 2023: R Manoj Memorial Poetry Award – Rashtramee Maamsa
- 2023: Kanjikavu Kunjikrishnan Smaraka Kavitha Puraskaram– Rashtramee Maamsa
- 2024: Shravasti Award – Rashtramee Maamsa
- 2025: Pala Narayanan Nair Award – Rashtramee Maamsa
- 2025: Udaya Sahitya Award – Rashtramee Maamsa
