= Ajijesh Pachat =

Indian writer

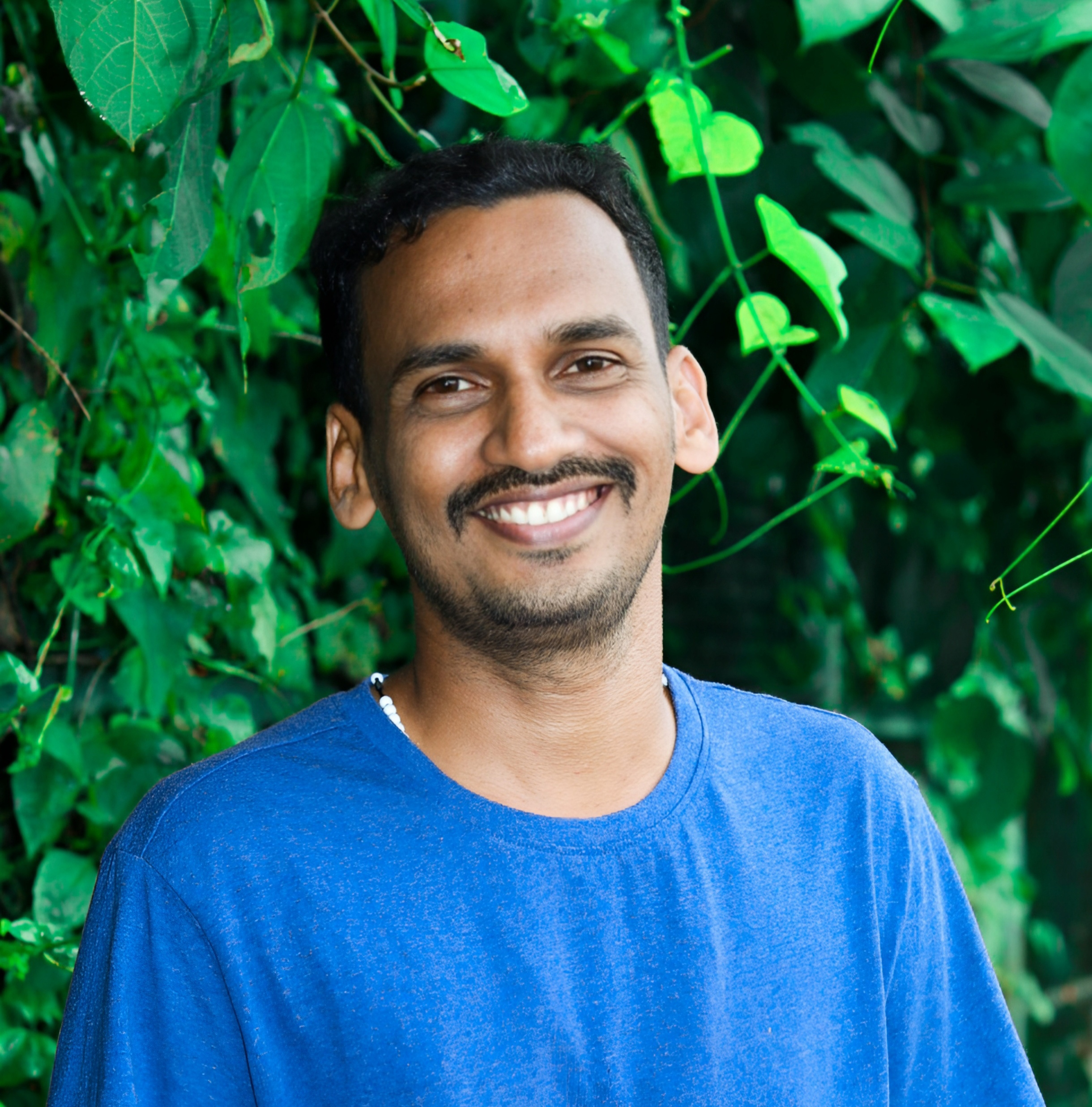
- Born: Malappuram
- Education: VPKMMHSS Puthur Pallikkal
- Occupations: Novelist, short story writer, columnist
- Writing career
- Language: Malayalam
- Years active: 2014 – present
- Notable works: Kisebi, Daivakkali, Athirazhisootram, Ezhampathippinte Adyaprathi

Ajijesh Pachat is a Malayalam novelist, short story writer and columnist from Malappuram district of Kerala, India. He has won numerous awards, including the Kerala Sahitya Akademi Geetha Hiranyan Award.

== Career ==
Ajijesh Pachat was born as the son of Krishnan and Shobana in Pallikkal, Malappuram, Kerala. His story Theevrashapam (The extreme curse) was published in the magazine Chandrika. In 2006, he won second place in short story contest conducted by Samakalika Malayalam weekly for his story To X-ray under 16. Pachat published his first collection of stories, Kisebi in 2016 . His Daivakkali (God's game), short stories collection, won the Geetha Hiranyan Endowment by Kerala Sahitya Akademi in 2017. His first novel Ezhampathippinte Adya Prathi ( The first copy of the seventh edition) was published in 2019. He has also wrote for The Indian Express, Madhyamam and Deshabhimani.

== List of works ==
=== Collection of short stories ===
- Kisebi
- Daivakkali
- Koovalkkinarugal
- Ponmoorcha
- Thakkolulla Kutti
- Radclifinte Katrika
- Pedippathipp
- Pashumathigal
- Castrolsavashesham
- Ma Enna Carnivalile Nayakanum Nayikayum
- Oru Rajesh Meshari Nirmithi
- Irachikkalappa
- Ara Manikkoor Dairgyam Ulla Chodyappeppar
- Koova
- Peda
- Paralux

=== Novels ===
- Athirazhisootram
- Ezhampathippinte Adyaprathi

=== Other works ===
- Orankutti vangiya aarthavappoometha (Memoir)
- Kayal Kandam Route(Novella)

== Awards and honours ==
- Kerala Sahitya Akademi Geetha Hiranyan Endowment
- Anganam TV Kochubava award
- PN Panicker Story Award
- Keli Short Story Award
- Kalakaumudy - K. Sukumaran Story Award
- M. P. Narayana Pillai Story Award
- K. S Bimal Story Award
- Chembil John Award
