= Deepa Palanad =

Indian Kathakali musician)

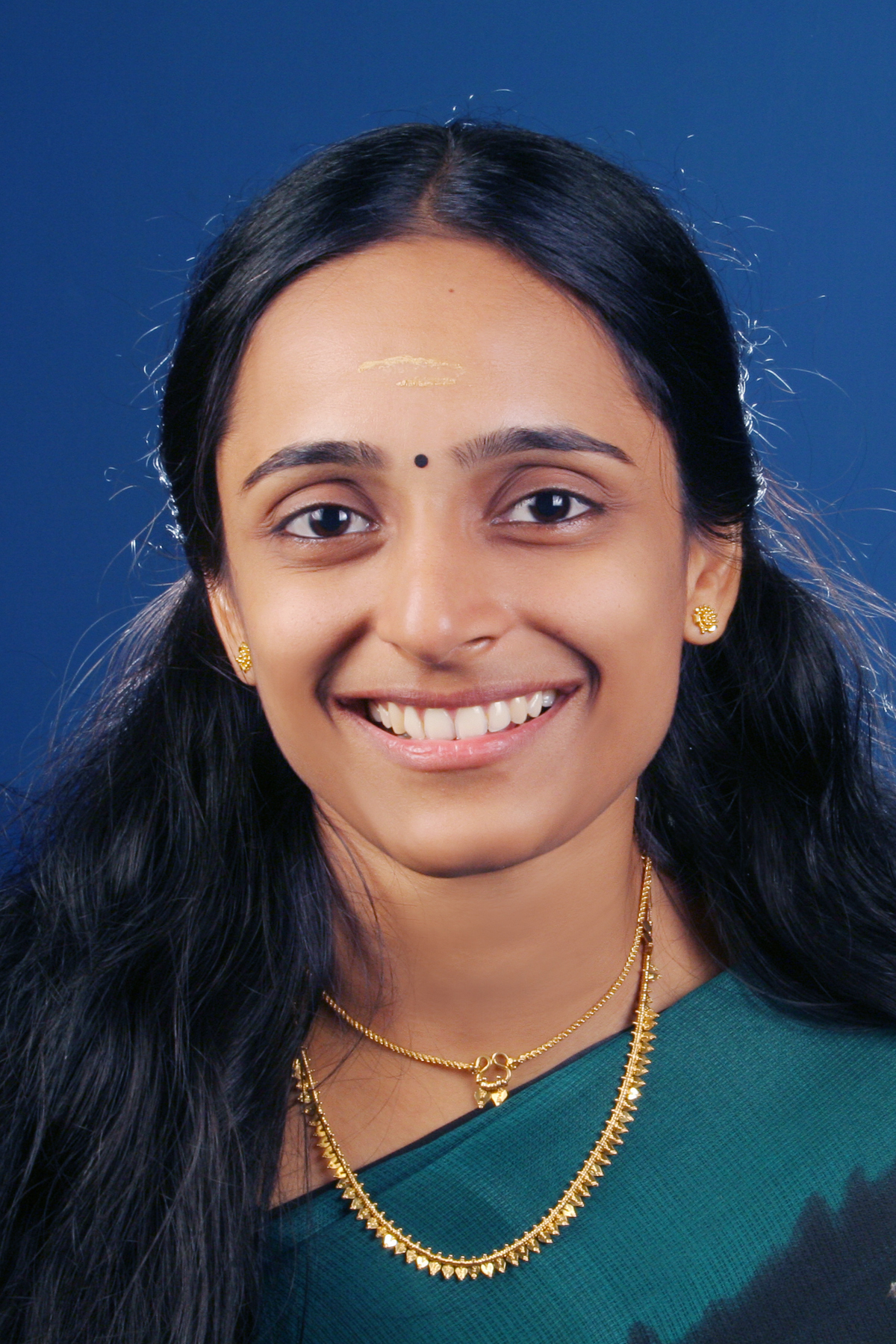
- Deepa in 2007
- Born: Deepa; 17 April 1982 (age 44); Pulamantol, Malappuram, Kerala
- Occupations: Kathakali musician, maths teacher

Deepa Palanad (born 17 April 1982) is one of the few female Kathakali musicians from the Indian state of Kerala. She is known to make a mark in the four-century-old classical dance-drama from a social system, that kept women away from temple art, which is mostly dominated by men.

== Life and career ==
Deepa was born at Kattupara in Pulamanthol village near Perinthalmanna in Malappuram district, Kerala as the daughter of Kathakali musician Palanad Diwakaran and Sudha. She started learning the basics of Carnatic music from her father at the age of three and later received first lessons in Kathakali music from her father's teacher, Kalamandalam Unnikrishna Kurup. She then learned advanced Carnatic music under V. V. Sadanandan, Velnezhi Subramanian, Punnapuzha Ramanathan and Vechur Shankar. She studied Kathakali music under Madambi Subrahmanyanambuthiri and Kottakkal Madhu. Deepa has also studied dance under Kalamandalam Sudha.

Deepa's stage debut was delayed because there was no other girl available to sing along with her. Finally in 1999, when Deepa made her debut at the age of seventeen, it was her brother Sudeep who sang with her. Since then, she has performed with artistes like Hyderali at many venues in Kerala. Deepa, who also completed her BEd in 2003, started her career as a maths teacher at UCNNM Porur Aided UP School in 2010.

Deepa has won first place in the Kerala State School Arts Festival for Kathakali music. She is also a winner of the Kalamandalam Unnikrishna Kurup Memorial Kathakali Music Competition. Deepa studied Kathakali music for ten years with a scholarship from the central government. In 2021, she was honoured with the Venmani Haridas Award, which is given for the young singers in Kathakali.
