= Kudallur =

- Village
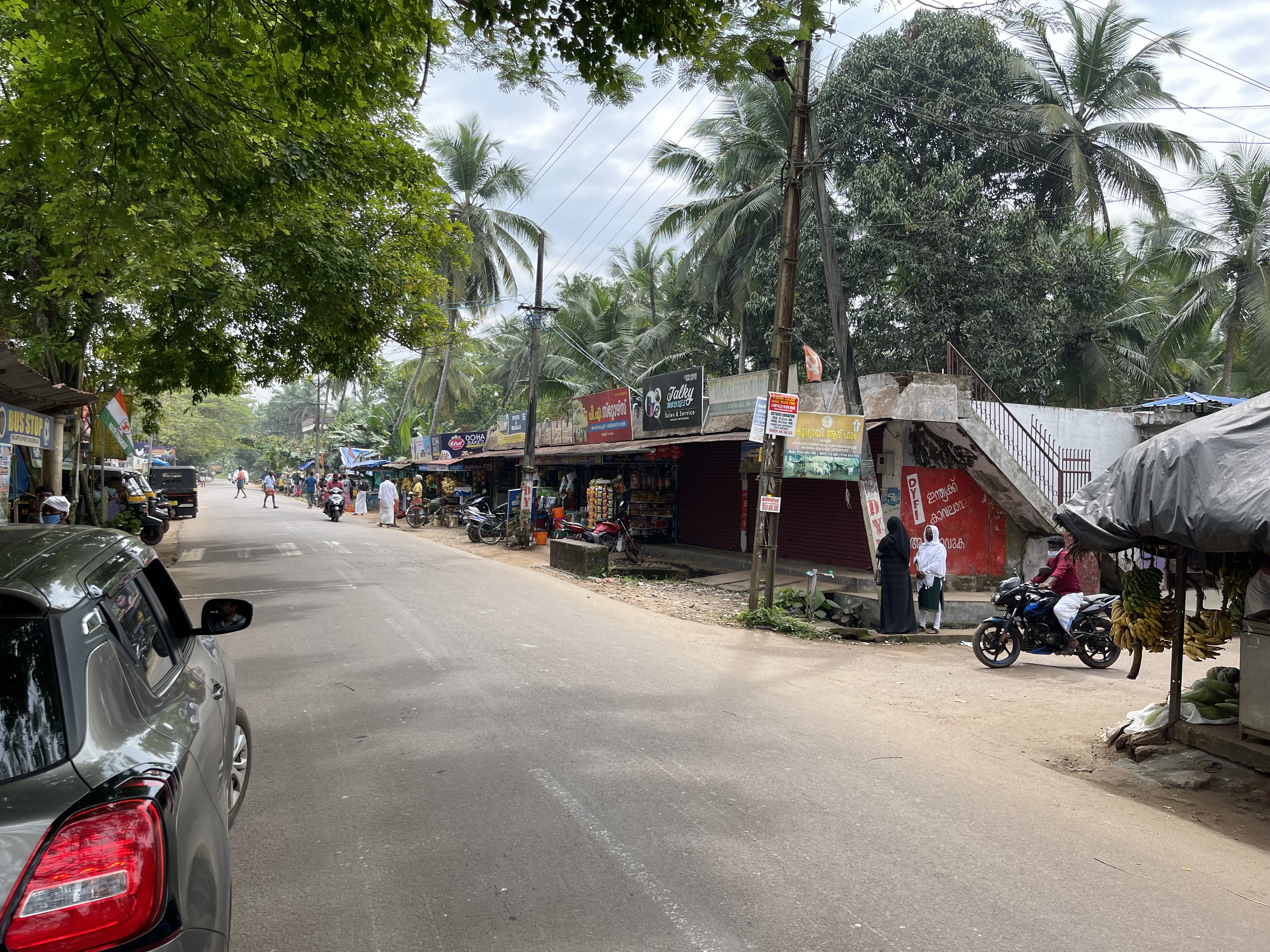

- Location in Kerala, India Kudallur (India)
- Coordinates: 10°50′0″N 76°5′0″E
- Country: India
- State: Kerala
- District: Palakkad

Languages
  - Official: Malayalam, English
- Time zone: UTC+5:30 (IST)
- Vehicle registration: KL-52

Kudallur is in the Palakkad district of Kerala. It is in Pattambi taluk, bordering Malappuram district, also on the banks of Bharathapuzha. The Bharathappuzha river separates Kudallur from Kuttippuram town in Malappuram district. Kudallur is a part of Thrithala (State Assembly constituency) and Ponnani (Lok Sabha constituency).

Kudallur is the meeting point of three Taluks - Pattambi Taluk, Ponnani taluk (neighbouring Thavanur village in Malappuram district), and Tirur Taluk (neighbouring Kuttippuram town).

== History ==
The famous Malayalam writer M. T. Vasudevan Nair was born there. The other well-known personality from here is artist Achutan Kudallur. Among the eminent personalities of the past, P.K. Moideen Kutty Sahib dominates a prominent position. He was a great freedom fighter who was put in British jail for several years. P.K. Moideen Kutty Sahib was an elected member to the Madras Assembly in 1937. He also served as the president of the Kerala Pradesh Congress Committee and as a All India Congress Committee member. During the flood of 1942, P.K. Moideen Kutty Sahib worked as a front-line warrior of all relief activities. He also played a vital role to restart the construction of Kuttippuram bridge which had been blocked because of World War II

His cousin P.K. Abdulla Kutty Sahib was another Freedom Fighter from this area. He spent many years in Kannur and Viyyoor jails during British reign. He was well-known Gandhian and participated in “Khadi-Prasthan” in the post British era.

== Administration ==
Kudallur is in the Palakkad district and Pattambi taluk which borders the Malappuram district. It is a part of Anakarra Panchayat, Thrithala (State Assembly Constituency) and Ponnani (Lok Sabha Constituency).

== Geography ==
It is at Kudallur, exactly at Koottakadavu the two rivers Nila and Thootha meet. Therefore, it is said that the place got the name from the confluence of these rivers, with 'koodal' meaning joining and 'oor' meaning place in Malayalam, thus a meeting place of the rivers. Kudallur Hills, mentioned in Nair's stories, are another point of attraction. The village is in Anakkara Panchayath, Thrithala block i.e. in Pattambi Taluk.'Vadakkumuri','Muthu Vilayum Kunnu' and 'Paarappuram' are important residential areas of Kudallur.
