= Vaidyaratnam Triprangode Moossad =

Indian Ayurveda practitioner

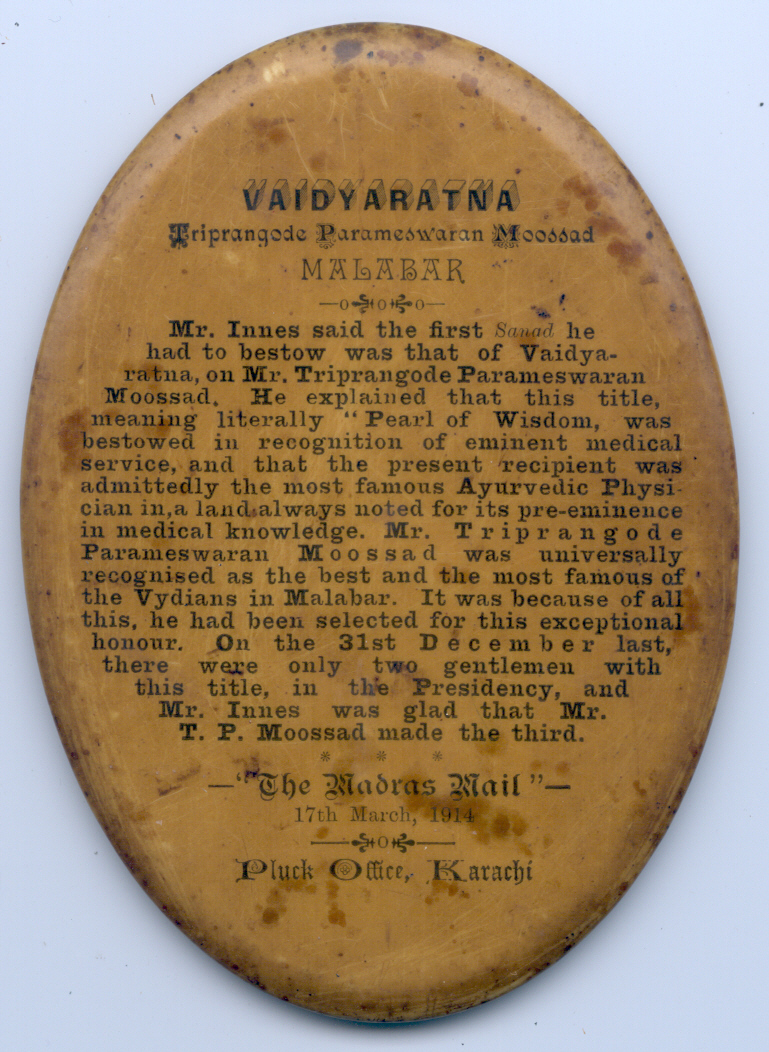
News Clip Souvenir on Vaidyaratna T P Moossad

Vaidyaratnam Triprangode Parameswaran Moossad (1847–1919) was an Ayurveda practitioner from Kerala, India. He is well-regarded as the First Ayurvedic practitioner in Kerala to be awarded with the title of "Vaidyaratna", given to the native medical practitioners in India, by the erstwhile British Raj in India. Vaidya, in Indian language means a medical practitioner, and ratna means jewel. Only three such awards were ever given by the British Raj in the state of Kerala, which was part of Madras Presidency then. The second award was given to E.T.Narayanan Mooss of Thaikkattussery, in the year of 1923 and third was given to Vaidyaratnam P. S. Warrier of Kottakkal in the year 1934. The second and third Vaidyaratna awardees had business acumen as well and they had established their Ayurvedic hospitals which are being run by their successors even today. In contrast, the first awardee, Triprangode Parameswaran Moossad had not established any commercial institutions. He had taken a lead role in establishing the Keraleeya Ayurveda Samajam, an organization founded by several scholars of those times, with the objective of making the benefits of Ayurveda system of treatment available to all the sections of the society, irrespective of the caste, creed and religion. It is notable that T.P. Moossad had lived during troubled times, wherein India was still under colonial rule of the British Raj, and the country was highly caste-driven, orthodox and very poor. Moossad, along with his several associates had established the Samajam, breaking several social barriers in their efforts to give relief to many from various diseases.

== Life and career ==
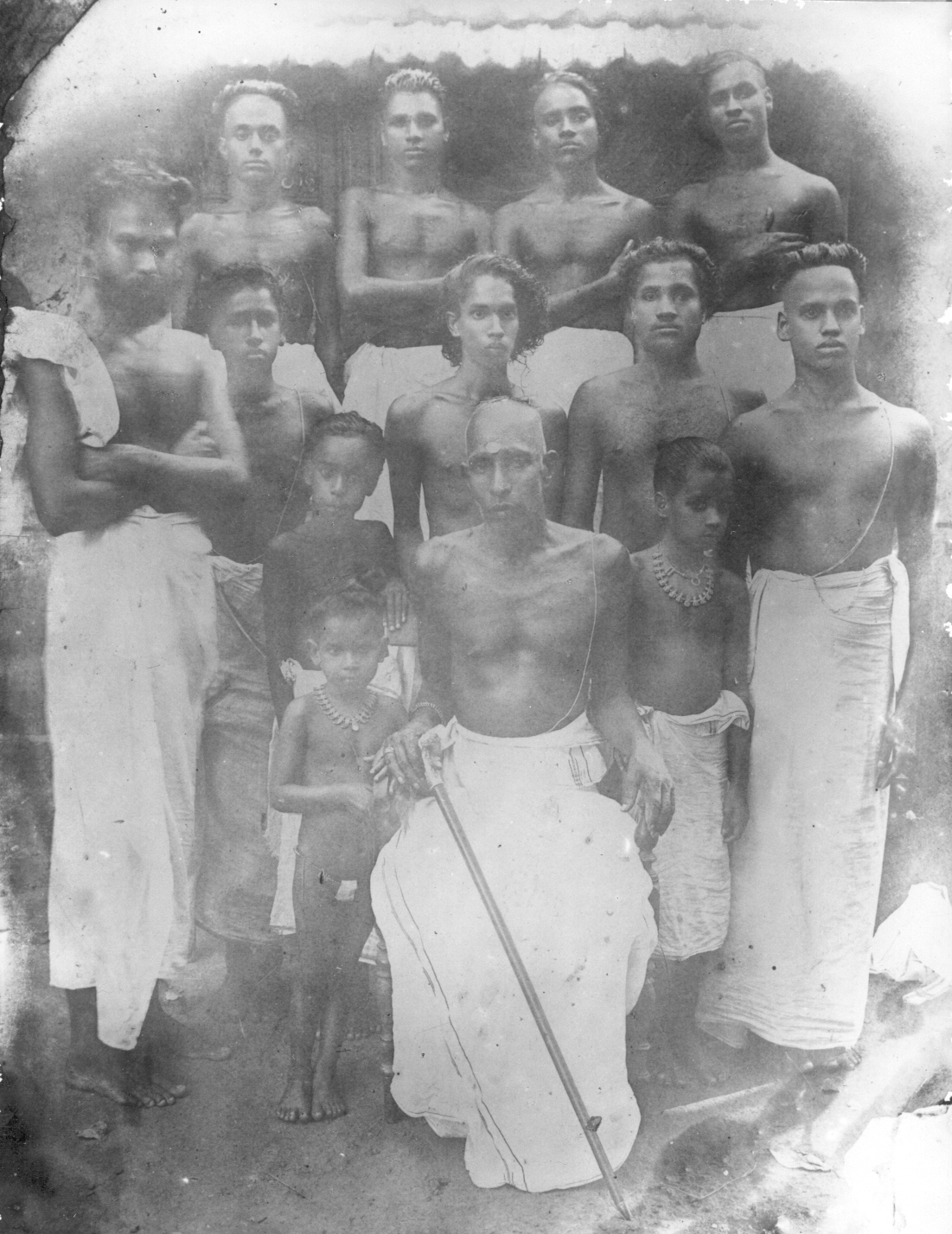
Vaidyaratnam T P Moossad with disciples and family members - photo dated 1914

Triprangode Kizhakkempullath Parameswaran Moossad was born in 1847 in Triprangode in Malappuram district in Kerala, India, in a family of Sanskrit and Ayurveda scholars belonging to the Moossad community.

He learned his lessons in Sanskrit and Ayurveda system of medicine under his own paternal uncle, Kizhakkempullath Sankaran Moossad (alias Kunjunni Moossad) who was a renowned scholar of his times.

Information on his life and career can be traced only through documents written in Malayalam. An old Malayalam book, published in the year 1920, and reproduced in a recent Malayalam book gives a very brief account of his life and career. According to this, he was a scholarly practitioner of Ayurveda and also a social reformer, highly acclaimed for his pro-people attitudes. He was part of the administration as Taluk Board Member and District Board Member for several years. He had been a medical adviser at several palaces - Kollenkode Palace, Kadathanadu Palace, Chirakkal Palace, Mankada Palace etc.

He died in 1919 at the age of 72. He was succeeded by his son Kizhakkempullath Narayanan Moossad, who was also a practitioner of Ayurveda, but could not reach the professional excellence as achieved by his father.

== Major awards and Recognitions ==
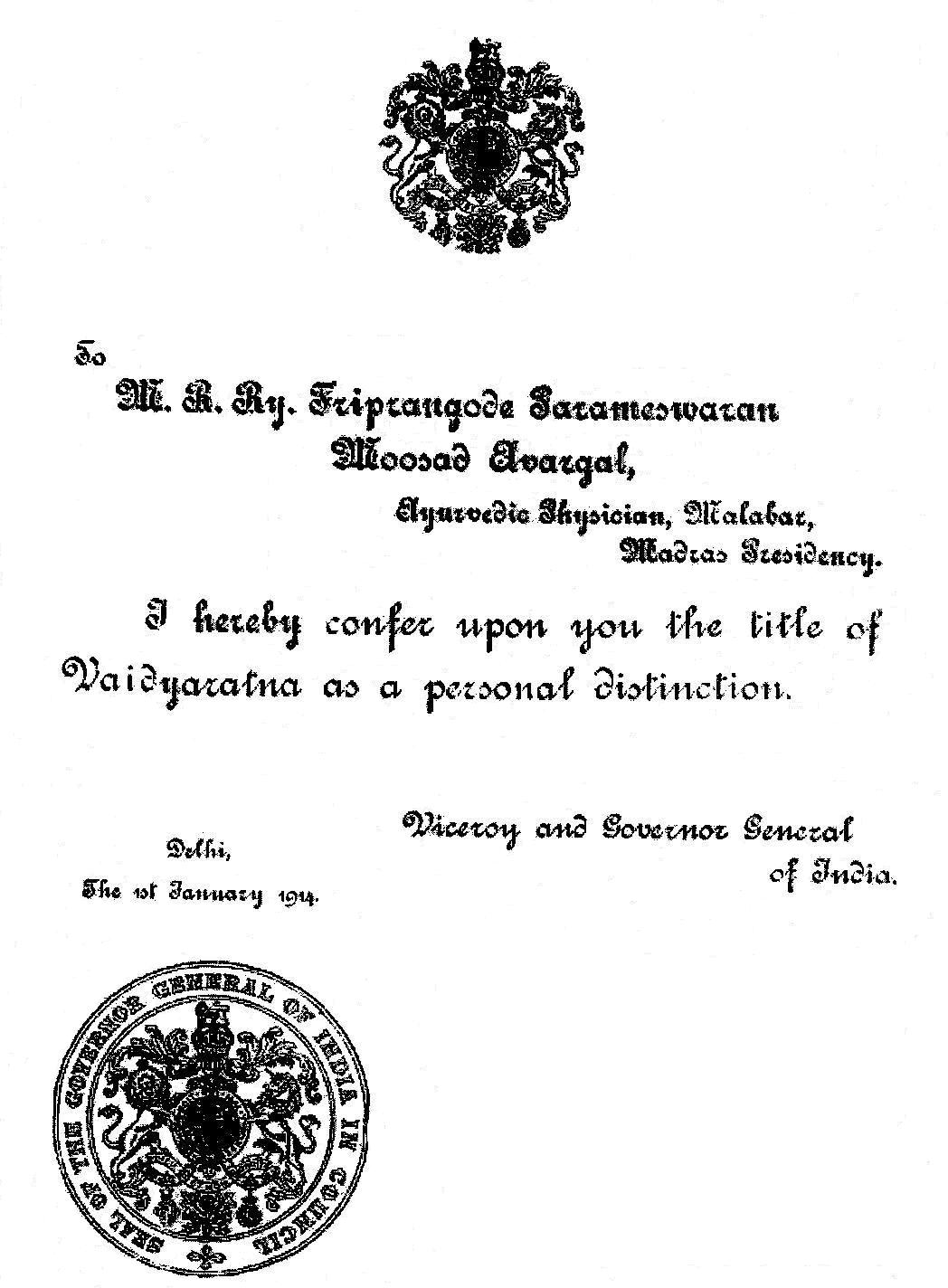
Citation of the Vaidyaratna title

In 1914, in recognition of his services to humanity, Triprangode Parameswaran Moossad was conferred the title of 'Vaidyaratna' by His Excellency the Viceroy and Governor General of India. Prior to this he was given various awards by the kings of Kingdom of Kochi and Travancore including jewel-studded gold bracelets known as 'Veerashringala'. Sometime around 1910, he was invited by the then Judge of Bombay High Court, Sir Narayan Chandavarkar, for treating a chronic disease in his family. Moossad could completely cure the ailing patient which was a great surprise for Sir Chandavarkar and more so for the Chief Justice of Bombay High Court, Sir Basil Scott. This incident paved the way for recommending Moossad's name for the award of the title of Vaidyaratna by the Viceroy of British Raj in India, which was eventually awarded to him on 1 January 1914. According to a Newsclip Souvenir available with the descendants of Moossad, he was the third awardee of Vaidyaratna in the Madras Presidency.
