= Veliyankode Umar Khasi =

Muslim scholar, freedom fighter and poet from British India

Valiyankode Umer Qazi
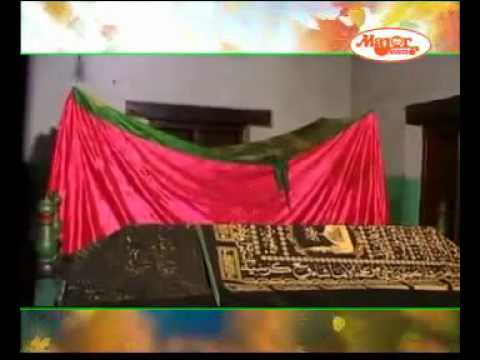
- Valiyankode Umer Qazi
- Born: c. 1757; Valiyankode, Ponnani Malappuram district, Kerala, India.
- Died: 1856
- Other names: Valiyullahi Umer Qazi, Valiyankode Umer Qazi
- Known for: the Civil disobedience movement

Valiyankode Umer Qazi (Arabic:عاشق الرسول عمر القاضي بلنكوتي المليباري, Malayalam: വെളിയങ്കോട്ട് ഉമര്‍ ഖാസി(റ) ) was a Muslim scholar, freedom fighter and poet. He was active in the Civil disobedience movement and refused to pay tax to the government in British India.

== Early life ==
QUaZi was born to Ali Musliyar, a decedent of Sheikh Hasan Tabee, and Amina, in the house known as "Kaziyarakath" in Hijra 1177 Rabee Awal 10 FRIDAY. His parents died before he was ten years old. He obtained the basic studies from his father in his early childhood.

When he was eleven, he was enrolled in Tanoor Darse, under the mentorship Ahmed Musliyar, a decedent of Makdoom family. He then studied with Aboobacker Hisham, also known as Aoukoya Musliyar. He was admitted in Ponnani Darse in his 13th year and accepted the guidance of Mammikutty Kazi. He learned Fathul Mueen and other authentic classical texts from there. After the six-year course at Ponnani, he left there after the death of his teacher Mammikutty Musliyar.

== The meeting with Mamburam Thangal ==
He travelled to Mamburam Thangal with his friend Aoukoya. It is believed he lost all of his knowledge by confusing in the authenticity of the Thangal as Sheikh Murabbe. He accepted Mamburam Thangal as his guide, and this meeting was recorded by Mamburam Mala.

== His social service ==
He was installed as the supreme judge in the Muslim locality, under Valiyangode Juma Masjid. He depended upon Thuhfa of Ibn Hajar to announce the verdicts. He was appointed as Mudarris, the chief dean in the mosque-based college. He was accompanied by his companion Aoukoya Musliyar, who served as his assistant and coworker. Debates occurred between them on the swalath between Tarvih namaz.

== As Freedom fighter ==
He was an early participant in the Civil disobedience movement in Indian peninsula, refusing to pay tax ordered by Amsham Adikari, the local chieftain appointed by the British government. Marakkar Sahib stepped in and promised to pay his tax until his death. When Marakkar Sahib died, the issue once again became problematic.

== As a poet ==
He wrote poetry. During his stay in jail, he conveyed his thought to Mamburam via poems. He used to send his letters with poems.

Transliterated title	Original title	Translated title	Theme
Swallal Ilahu	صلّى الإلٰه	Almighty Says Swalath	The life of Prophet and his specialty
Nafaesu Durar	نفائس الدّرر	The precious gems	Some rare knowledge
Lahal Ul Hilalau	لاه الهلال	Crescent emerged	lauding Prophet
Jafath Ni	جفتني	Covered me	The praise of Prophet
Lamma Dahar	لمّا ظهر	When appeared	About Prophet
Allafa al Aasi	الّف العاصي	A convicted composed	praise of Prophet
Maqasid ul Nikah	مقاصد النّكاح	Objectives of marriage	Islamic laws related to marriage based on Shafi School of Thought
Tarajim ul Muharramath	تراجيم المحرّمات	Explanation on forbidden	Islamic laws related to forbidden based on Shafi School of Thought
Kitabu al Swaidh Wal Isthiyad	كتاب الصّيد والإصطياد	Text on Slaughtering and hunting	Islamic regulation related to slaughtering and hunting
asool dabah wa kasaa'id	أصول الذبح والقصائد	Origin of slaughter and poems	

== Affection for Muhammed ==
He expressed his passion for the Islamic Prophet Muhammed in poems and prose. The lines which start with عمر الفقير are carved in the threshold of Muhammad's shrine in Medina.

== Death ==
Realising he would soon die, he prepared his own grave and awaited death.
