= U. Sharaf Ali =

Indian footballer

U. Sharaf Ali (born 30 May 1964) is a former Indian International football player from Malappuram district, Kerala. His playing position was defender. Sharaf played for Calicut University during his college days. On 6 February 2023, he was appointed as the President of Kerala State Sports Council.

Sharaf Eli joined Kerala Police. Several leading Indian players including, V. P. Sathyan, C. V. Pappachan, and I. M. Vijayan were his teammates in Kerala Police Team. They played a major role in strengthening the Kerala State Team during the 1990s and helped Kerala to win Santosh Trophy in 1992 and 1993. He was a Police commandant in Kerala.

In 1994, Sharaf played for the Indian national side against Beirut in the FIFA World Cup qualifying rounds held at Korea and Hong Kong. Now, he is in RRRF and functions as Police Commandant.
