= Dileep K. Nair =

Indian educationist, campaigner, activist and publisher

Dileep K Nair
- Born: 1978 (age 47–48); Tirur, Kerala, India
- Education: University of Calicut
- Occupations: Chancellor - NEFTU, educationist, skill development campaigner, social activist, publisher

Dileep K Nair is an Indian educationist, skill development campaigner, entrepreneur, social activist, and publisher. He is from Banglore, India. He is the first and the youngest Chancellor of North East Frontier Technical University (NEFTU) in Aalo, Arunachal Pradesh, India. He first setup the institute of Information technology and management in Pune.

== Positions held ==
- Chancellor – North East Frontier Technical University.
- Founder & Chairman – The Automobile Society of India.
- Founder & Chairman – The Engineers Outlook Magazine.
