= Nandanar (author) =

Indian writer (1926–1974)

P. C. Gopalan (Nandanar)
- Born: 5 January 1926; Angadipuram, Malabar, Madras Presidency, British India
- Died: 24 April 1974 (aged 48); Palghat, Kerala, India
- Occupations: Novelist, short story writer
- Spouse: Radha
- Children: 1 son
- Relatives: Parameshwaran Tharakan (father); Nanikkutty Amma (mother)
- Writing career
- Genres: Novel, short Story
- Notable awards: 1964 Kerala Sahitya Akademi Award for Novel

P. C. Gopalan (5 January 1926 – 24 April 1974), popularly known by his pseudonym, Nandanar was an Indian writer of Malayalam literature. He was known for his novels and short stories which had the backdrop of the Indian Army barracks of the 1940s and 1950s as well as for his children's literature. Anubhavangal, Ira, Thokkukalkkidayile Jeevitham, Athmavinte Novukal, Ariyappedatha Manushyajeevikal, Anubhoothikalude Lokam and a series of stories with Unnikkuttan as the lead character are some of his better known works. He received the Kerala Sahitya Akademi Award for Novel in 1964 for his work, Athmavinte Novukal.

== Biography ==
He walked along the crowded street towards the hotel. How crowded the street is! Is the street more crowded today? This time tomorrow, will these people be there on the face of this earth? How many of them will have merged with the eternal truth that is death. Will I be one among them? Excerpts from ‘’Life does not end’’, the short story Nandanar wrote just before committing suicide

P. C. Gopalan was born on 5 January 1926, in a poor family at Angadippuram, a village near Perinthalmanna in the present-day Malappuram district in the south Indian state of Kerala to Parameshwaran Tharakan and Nanikkutty Amma. His early schooling was at a local elementary school but due to poverty, he had to abandon his studies after 5th standard. He joined the Indian Army in 1942 where he served until his superannuation in 1964 after which he worked for three years as the National Cadet Corps inspector in Mysore. Returning to Kerala, he joined Fertilisers and Chemicals Travancore in 1967 as their Public Relations Officer.

Nandanar was married to Pandathuveettil Radha and the couple had a son, Sudakaran. He committed suicide on 24 April 1974, at the age of 48, at Commons Lodge, a lodging facility he used to stay at whenever he visited Palakkad, by consuming an overdose of sleeping pills.

== Legacy ==
Nandanr took his pseudonym after Nandanar, one of the 63 Nayanars in Shaivism. Considered among the major writers of his generation, Nandanar wrote six novels, eleven short story anthologies and Unnikkuttante Lokam, a book for children which comprises three parts viz. Unnikkuttante Oru Divasam, Unnikkuttan Schoolil and Unnikkuttan Valarunnu. His novels and short stories depict the nostalgic sentiments of army men who leave their families back home as well as lives in the villages of Kerala and the longing of youth of his time in matters of love. Besides works like Aathmavinte Novukal, Anubhavangal , Manjakettidam and Ariyappedatha Manushyajeevikal, he also published an autobiographical work, Anubhavangal details the penury of the writer's childhood. as well as two plays, Prashnam Avasaanikkunnilla and Hsuan Tsang. He received the Kerala Sahitya Akademi Award for Novel in 1964, his novel, Aathmavinte Novukal, earning him the award.

== In popular media ==
Atayalangal, the 2008 biopic which received four awards including the Best Director Award for M. G. Sasi at the 39th Kerala State Film Awards of 2008 is based on Anubhavangal, Nandanar's biographical novel. The name of the film was changed from Anubhavangal.

== Bibliography ==
=== Novels ===
- Nandanar (1963). Aathmaavinte Novukal (in Malayalam). Thrissur: Current Books. OCLC 20034023.
- Nandanar (1968). Manjakettidam (in Malayalam). Thrissur: Current Books. OCLC 31119036.
- Nandanar (1964). Anubhūthikaḷuṭe Lōkaṃ (in Malayalam). Thrissur: Current Books. OCLC 30562567.
- Nandanar (1999). Anubhavagṅaḷ. Kozhikode: P K Brothers. OCLC 47790718.
- Nandanar. Aayiravallikunninte Thazhvarayil. Green Books. ISBN 9788184231137.
- Nandanar. Ariyappedatha Manushyajeevikal. Poorna Publications. ISBN 8130000415.

=== Short stories ===
- Nandanar (1969). Oru Varṣhakālarāthr̲i (in Malayalam). Sāhitya Pravartraka Sahakaraṇasaṃghaṃ. OCLC 31068705.
- Nandanar (1971). Konnappookkaḷ (in Malayalam). Kōṭṭayaṃ: Sāhityapr̲avarttaka Sahakaraṇasaṅghaṃ. OCLC 31119089.
- Nandanar (1972). Ira. Kōṭṭayaṃ: Sāhityapravarttaka Sahakaraṇasaṅghaṃ. OCLC 31433529.
- Nandanar (1974). Oru Sauhr̥udasandarśanaṃ. Kōṭṭayaṃ: Sāhityapr̲avarttaka Sahakaraṇasaṅghaṃ. OCLC 30929027.
- Nandanar (1981). Niṣhkalaṅkathayuṭe Aathmāv (in Malayalam). Kozhikode: Poorna Publications. OCLC 10457963.
- Nandanar (1981). Jeevithattinte Pon Naāḷaṅgaḷ (in Malayalam). Kozhikode: Poorna Publications. OCLC 12016337.
- Nandanar (1993). Thōkkukaḷkkiṭayile Jeevithaṃ. Ciṅgavanaṃ; Kōṭṭayaṃ: Current Books. ISBN 9788124000748. OCLC 32842122.
- Nandanar (1999). Nandanārude Kathakal. Kōṭṭayaṃ: Current Books. OCLC 44774932.
- Nandanar (2007). Sampuoorṇṇakathakaḷ. Kozhikode: Poorna Publications. ISBN 9788130006307. OCLC 273841430.
- Nandanar (2011). Nantanāruṭe paṭṭāḷakkathakaḷ: kathakaḷ. Kōṭṭayaṃ: Grand Books. OCLC 769743756.

=== Children's literature ===
- Nandanar (1973). Uṇṇikkuṭṭant̲e Lōkaṃ (in Malayalam). Kōṭṭayaṃ: P. Radha; National Book Stall. OCLC 8627909.
- Nandanar (1969). Uṇṇikkuṭṭan Vaḷarunnu (in Malayalam). Kōṭṭayaṃ: Sāhityapr̲avarttaka Sahakaraṇasaṅghaṃ. OCLC 31119149.

=== Translations into other languages ===
- Nandanar (2000). Sigh for the dawn. Translated by N. Kunju. New Delhi: Vishv Books. OCLC 5867622.
