= Tirur Nambissan =

Indian Kathakali singer

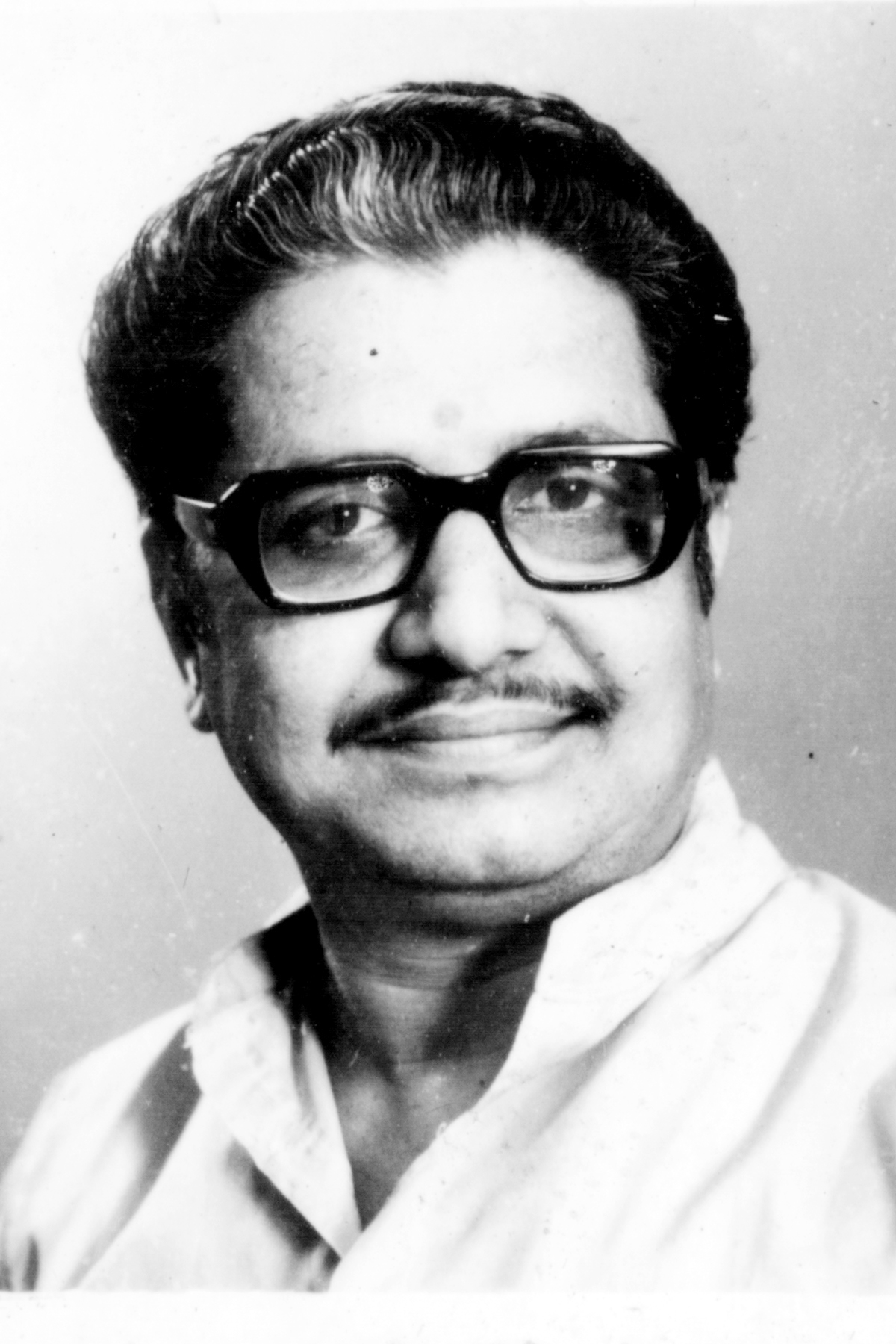
Tirur Nambissan

Tirur Nambissan (1942–1994) was a Kathakali singer. He was born as Narayanan Nambissan at Tirur in the Malappuram district of Kerala in southern India. He started learning music at the age of seven, while attending the local boys' high school. He could, however, not continue his formal education or his musical education because of the unexpected deaths of his mother, three brothers and father, as well as the suicide of his younger sister - all this before he was 15 years old.

Masters, including N K Vasudeva Panikkar, his first teacher in classical music, recognised his musical ability and guided him to Kerala Kalamandalam. Ending his school education, the eighth-form student started the journey to the world of Kathakali music under the guidance of Kalamandalam Neelakantan Nambisan, Sivaraman Nair, Kavungal Madhava Panikkar.

As a contemporary of Madambi Subramanian Namboodiri, Kalamandalam Hyderali, and Kalamandalam Sankaran Embranthiri, Tirur Nambissan studied Kathakali music at Kerala Kalamandalam under the traditional Gurukulam system. By their second year, students in the four-member cohort were capable of leading full Kathakali performances. Following the completion of the eight-year course with first-class honors, Nambissan began his career as a Kathakali musician.

After completing the course, each one started to struggle to earn money. Some of them reached ashore, but Nambeesan was alone. He considered it his duty to preserve the Kathakali tradition as he had learned it from his teachers. Despite changing attitudes in society, he maintained a conservative approach to Kathakali. He was not ready to compromise in the Kathakali chitta. it was his stand that, the peculiar style (called as sopanasamgeetham) of music composition is sufficient and apt for the Kathakali. In another meaning, as a supporting music of a classical art, Kathakali music is in its utmost. So he was against the experiments. Even he was a lover of light music, he concentrated to Kathakali music and was careful to keep the identity of that music which is different from other music. He considered that it is meaningless to compare Kathakali music with other music. According to him, the ragas fixed for each literature is sufficient for the expression of the Kathakali characters. Changing of raga is a mask to hide the inefficiency of singer to express the bhavam in the early composed raga. He used manodharmas to empower the bhavas of characters, standing inside the real frame of Kathakali. He was well regarded among Kathakali audiences.

He worked as a music teacher in PreurGandhiSevasadan, international Kathakali centre New Delhi, Bombay, Unnayivariyer Smaraka Kalanilayam irinjalakkuda, Parassini Kaliyogam, peingode Kathakali promotion Society, Kerala Kalamandalam in different periods. Students of these institutions of the same period including SadanamJyothi, and Radhakrishnan, Private students poomully Vasudevan Namboodirippad, and vellinezhi Achuthan Kutty are the students of Tirur Nambissan too He performed as ponnani (main singer) and as shakidi (helping singer) on thousands of stages in Kerala and out of Kerala. He was the main singer of the parassikkadavu muthappan kathakali yogam for a long period. He had been performing as ponnani with his classmates as the special invitees from parassini kaliyogam from second year of the kalamandalam course itself.

Nambissan died from a brain haemorrhage on 10 August 1994. He had been suffering various chronic illnesses, such as diabetes, for some time.

SUKHAMO DEVEE..
KATHAKALI MUSIC
