= Dhanish Karthik =

Indian actor (born 1989)

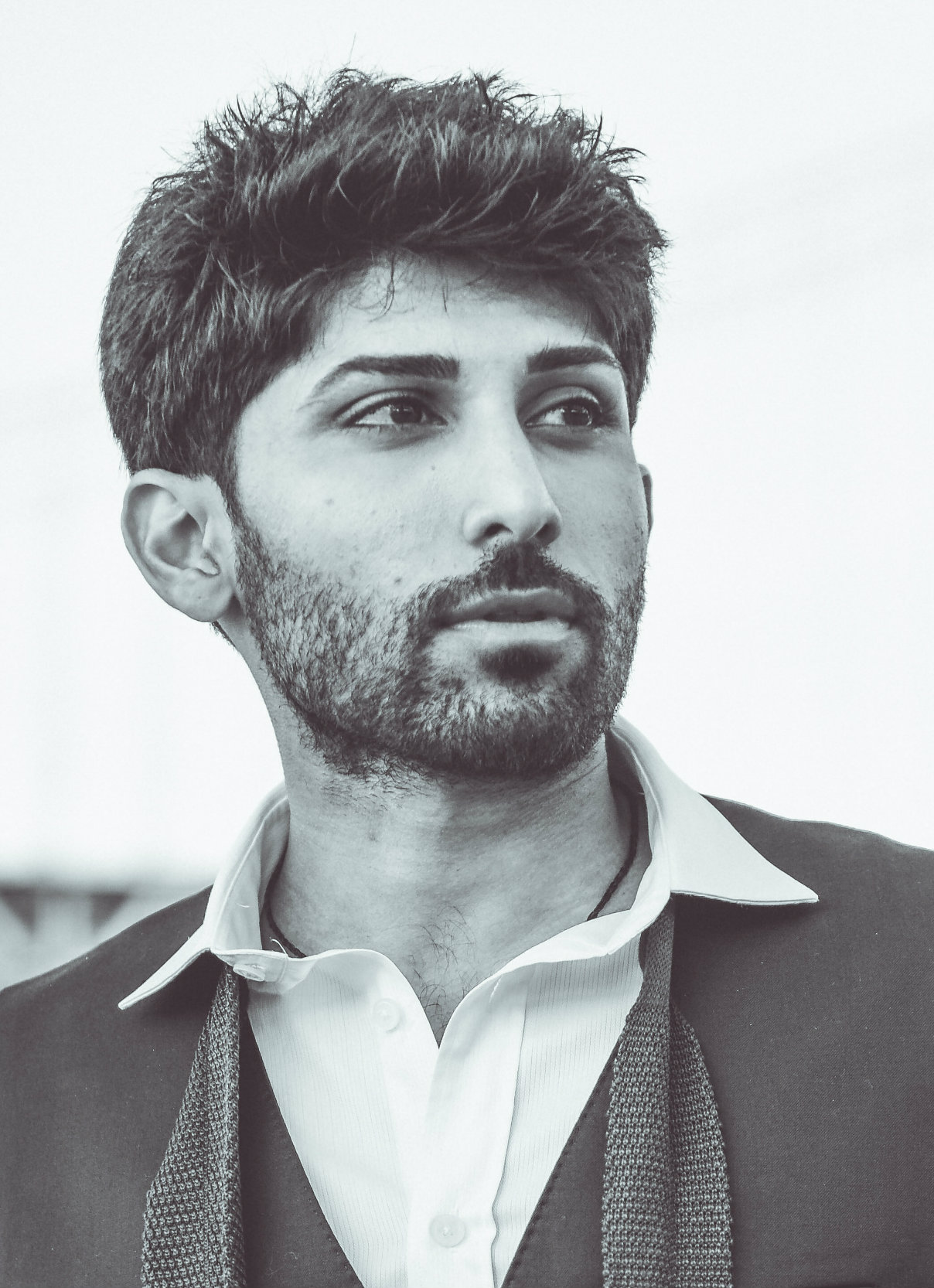
- Born: Nilambur, Kerala, India
- Occupation: Actor
- Years active: 2015-present

Dhanish Karthik is an Indian actor who works in Hindi, Malayalam and English films.

== Personal life ==
Dhanish Karthik was born in Nilambur, Kerala, India. He is the son of playback singer Nilambur Karthikeyan. Karthik currently resides in New York, USA.

== Filmography ==
Year	Title	Role	Language
2015	Ivide	Sanjeev Menon	Malayalam
2015	I Love You	Ponoose Kuriakose	Malayalam
2016	It's Free	Kesav Patel	English
2016	Hello Namasthe	RJ Dhanish	Malayalam
2017	Chef	Shahid Ahmed	Hindi
2018	Forbidden	Manpreet	Hindi
2019	Bull	Peter Mansley	English
2020	FBI	Aman Patel	English
2020	Katy Keene	Jorge's fan	English
