= Mohanakrishnan Kaladi =

Indian poet

Mohanakrishnan Kaladi is a Malayalam poet of the new age. He was born in 1978 at Kaladi (Malappuram, Kerala) and educated in chemistry. He is currently working as a chemistry professor at NSS College, Ottapalam. His poems are collected in six books: Palise, Mazhappottan' 'mambazhappaatha, Minukkam, Bhoothakkatta, and Rain Coat (D. C. Books, Kottayam) and Aanamazha (Kerala Balasahithya Institute). He has also published a prose-collection, Mattarum kanathey (Kairali books, Kannur)

Palise won the Kerala Sahitya Akademi "Kanakashree" award for poetry in 2006. He has also won the Vailoppilli-Shreerekha award, the K.B. Menon memorial award, the Atlas-Kairali award and Vailoppilli award for poetry.
