= K. C. Manavedan Raja =

Indian aristocrat and administrator

K C Manavedan Raja
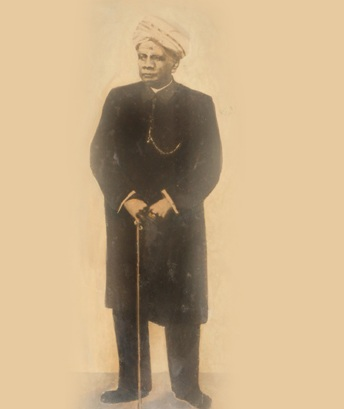

Zamorin Rajah Of Calicut
- In office 1932-1937
- Preceded by: PC Manavikraman Kunhunni Raja
- Succeeded by: K C Manavikraman Raja

Personal details
- Born: 1855
- Died: 1937 (aged 81–82)

His Highness Kizhakke Covilakam Manavedan Raja alias Cheriyanujan Raja (1855–1937) was an Indian aristocrat and administrator. He was the titular Zamorin of Calicut from 1932 to 1937.

Manavedan Raja was born in the Kottakkal branch of the Zamorin Royal family of Calicut in 1855. He graduated from the University of Madras and entered the provincial civil service, the first from the family. Appointed to the civil service on 4 June 1880, he rose to become Assistant Collector in 1882 and Sub-Collector by 1895. He also served as a District Collector and later a judge. In 1932, he succeeded to become the Zamorin of Calicut.

== As Zamorin ==
As the titular Zamorin, Manavedan Raja proved himself to be an able administrator and visionary. It was during his tenure, in 1934, that the famous Guruvayur Satyagraha happened. People, under the leadership of Gandhian K Kelappan, campaigned for the opening of Guruvayur Temple to all castes. Mahatma Gandhi himself came to Kerala in support of the movement, and met with the Zamorin Manavedan Raja, who was the chief administrator of Guruvayoor temple. Though the talks were not published, it is highly speculated that the Zamorin told Gandhi that he cannot take decisions which might cause great social unrest. Subsequently, Gandhi advised Kelappan to call off the Satyagraha.

Manavedan Raja started a Raja's High School in Kottakkal, for educating the children of Kovilakam. He also significantly improved and expanded Zamorins College at Calicut (now Zamorins Guruvayurappan College). Raja's children were well educated. His elder son became a District Collector. His fourth son, M. K. Vellodi joined Indian Civil Service and later became the first Chief Minister of Hyderabad State. Vellodi was the first High Commissioner of India to the UK. He later rose to the position of Cabinet Secretary.
