= Kannamangalam (Alappuzha) =

Village in Alleppy, Kerala

Kannamangalam Chettikulangara
- village
- Location in Kerala, India Kannamangalam (India)
- Coordinates: 9°13′0″N 76°29′0″E
- Country: India
- State: Kerala
- District: Alappuzha

Population (2011)
  - Total: 23,344

Languages
  - Official: Malayalam, English
- Time zone: UTC+5:30 (IST)
- Postal code: 690106 Mavelikara-6
- Vehicle registration: KL-31 or KL-29

Kannamangalam is a village in Mavelikkara Taluk in Alappuzha district in the Indian state of Kerala. It lies in Chettikulangara Grama Panchayath. Kannamangalam Mahadeva temple is the main landmark of the village. The deity of the temple is Lord Shiva. The temple is believed to be built by Kanvamahirshi. Kannamangalam Mahadevar is believed to be the father of Chettikulangara Devi. On the day of Shivarathri, Devi comes to meet her father and her devotees.

Notable junctions

- Chettikulangara
- Karippuzha
- Kochickal
- Panachammodu
- Puthisseriambalam
- Kadavoor
- Cherukara
- Vadakkethundam
- Kavunginvila
- Altharamoodu

Hospital

- Chettikulangara panchayat hospital

Markets

- Chettikulangara market
- Karippuzha market

Nearest villages

- Peringala
- Thekkekkara
- Pathiyoor

== Demographics ==
In the 2011 India census, Kannamangalam had a population of 23,344 with 10,873 males and 12,471 females.
