= Kapoor (disambiguation) =

Kapoor is a surname that originated with the Punjabi Khatri community.

Kapoor may also refer to:

- Karpoor, Sanskrit term for camphor as used in India in religious and other ceremonies

== People ==
- John Kapoor (born 1942/1943), Indian-American pharmaceutical entrepreneur
- Kapoor family, a Hindi-language acting family of India
- Venkat Kapoor, a character from Andy Weir's 2011 science fiction survival novel The Martian
  - Vincent Kapoor, the name of the character in the 2015 film based on the novel

== Places ==
- Kapoor Haveli (Kapoor House), Peshawar, Pakistan
- Kapoor Tunnel, an aqueduct for Victoria, British Columbia, Canada
- Kapoorgarh (Kapoor-village), Punjab, India

== See also ==
- Kapoor & Sons (2016 film), Indian Hindi-language family drama film
- Kapooria, a fungus genus discovered
- Kapur (disambiguation)
- Kapurpur (disambiguation)
- Kappur (disambiguation)
