= Haveli =

Traditional type of house in the Indian subcontinent

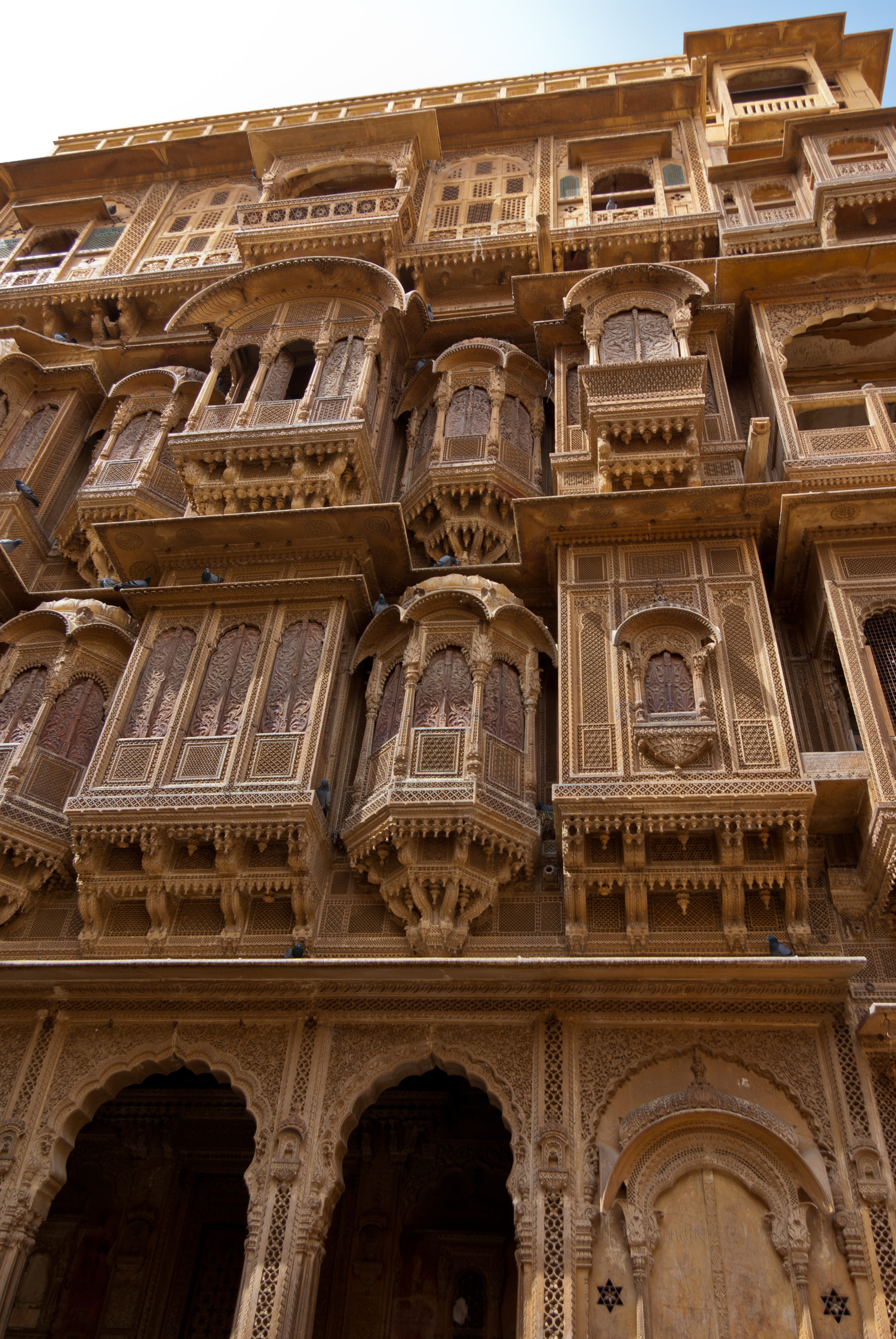
Patwon Ji Ki Haveli, Jaisalmer, Rajasthan, India.

A haveli is a traditional townhouse, mansion, or manor house, in the Indian subcontinent, usually one with historical and architectural significance, and located in a town or city. The word haveli is derived from Arabic hawali, meaning "partition" or "private space", popularised under the Mughal Empire, and was devoid of any architectural connotation. Later, the word haveli came to be used as a generic term for various styles of regional mansions, manor houses, and townhouses found in the Indian subcontinent.

== History ==
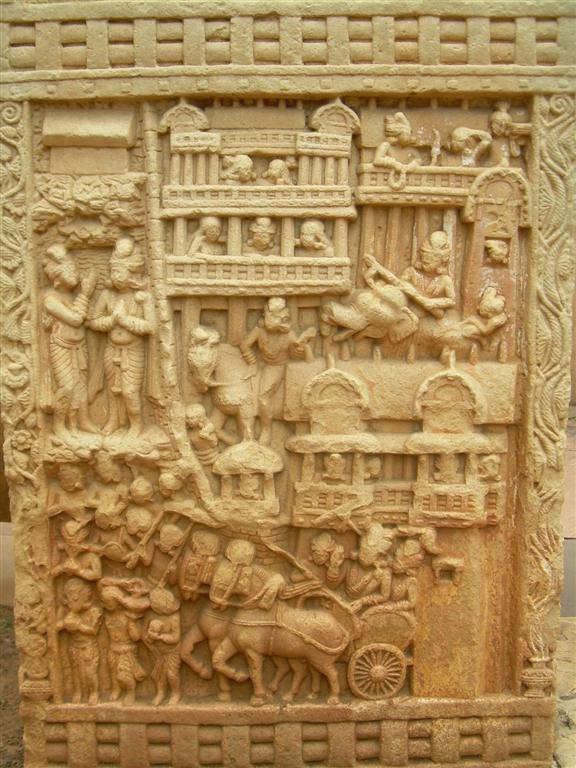
Multistorey structures and balconies during Mauryan Empire, 3rd century BCE

The term haveli originates from the Arabic word hawali, meaning "partition" or "private space", a term which was popularized under the Mughal Empire. Early havelis served Muslim rulers of the Indian subcontinent and became an important architectural component of urban environments under the Mughals. Although the term havelis originated from Indo-Islamic architecture, the existence of multi-story homes and courtyards in the region is claimed as early as 3300 BCE.

During the medieval period, the term haveli was also applied by some Vaishnava sects to refer to their temples in Gujarat under the Mughal Empire and Rajputana kingdoms. The generic term haveli eventually came to be identified with townhouses and mansions of the merchant class.

== Characteristics ==
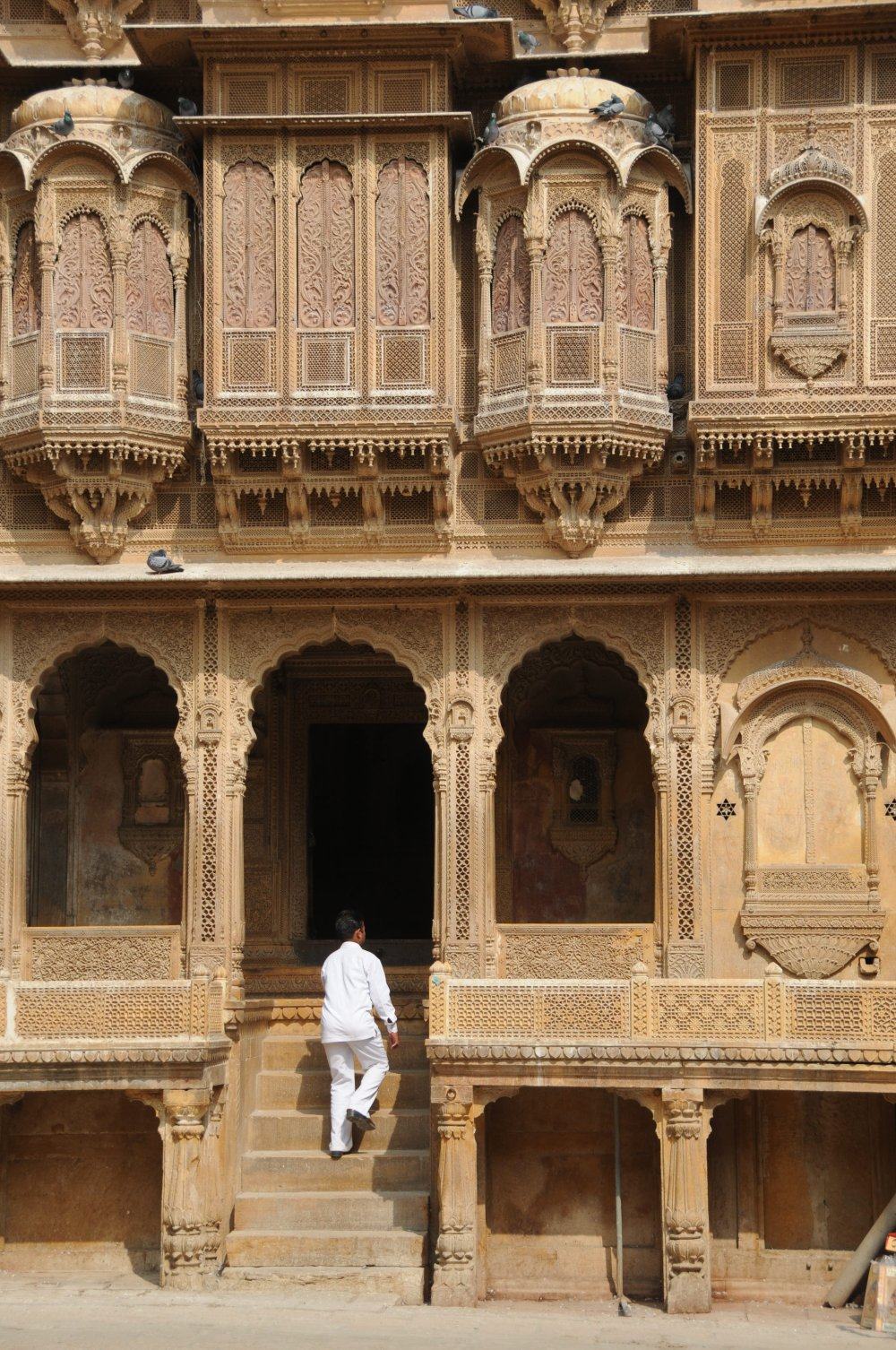
Townhouse Haveli with Jharokha windows.

=== Architecture ===
Courtyards are a common feature of traditional houses found on the Indian subcontinent, with early examples dating back to the Neolithic period, whether mansions or farmhouses. However, the architecture of these structures was very different from the traditional havelis developed under Muslim rule, which blended local and Islamic traditions. Traditional homes on the Indian subcontinent are built around a courtyard, and all family activities revolved around this chowk or courtyard. Additionally, the courtyard serves as a lightwell and helps ventilate the house in the hot and dry climates of the region.

All these elements join to form an enclosure and give the chowk a composed, secured feel. The architectural form of havelis has evolved in response to the climate, lifestyle, and availability of material. In hot climates where cooling is a necessity, buildings with internal courtyards for airflow and cooling were considered the most appropriate; in rainy places the houses were built to be kept dry from humid air. It provided shade while also allowing light inside. The arcade along the court, or the high wall around it, kept the interiors cool.

Many of the havelis of India and Pakistan were influenced by Rajasthani architecture. They usually contain a courtyard, often with a fountain in the center. The old cities of Agra, Lucknow, Jaisalmer and Delhi in India and Lahore, Multan, Peshawar, Hyderabad in Pakistan have many fine examples of Rajasthani-style havelis.

=== Usage ===
Sociocultural aspects
The chowk or courtyard served as the centre for various ceremonies and rituals. The sacred tulsi plant was placed here and worshipped daily to bring prosperity to the house.

Security and privacy
The chowk, at times, separated areas for men and women, and provided them with privacy.

Climate
Using open space in the building design to respond to the local climate, air movement caused by temperature differences assists in the natural ventilation of the building.

Different activities at different times
In the daytime, the court was used mostly by women to carry out their work and interact with other women in a private open space. Mansions of the merchant class often had more than one courtyard.

Articulation of space
In Mor chowk, part of the City Palace complex in Udaipur, there is the concept of the courtyard as a dancing hall. Similarly, in havelis, a courtyard has several functions, commonly used for weddings and festive occasions.

Materials
Bricks, sandstone, marble, wood, plaster, and granite are commonly used materials. Decorative aspects are influenced by various local cultures and traditions.

== Notable havelis by country ==
=== India ===
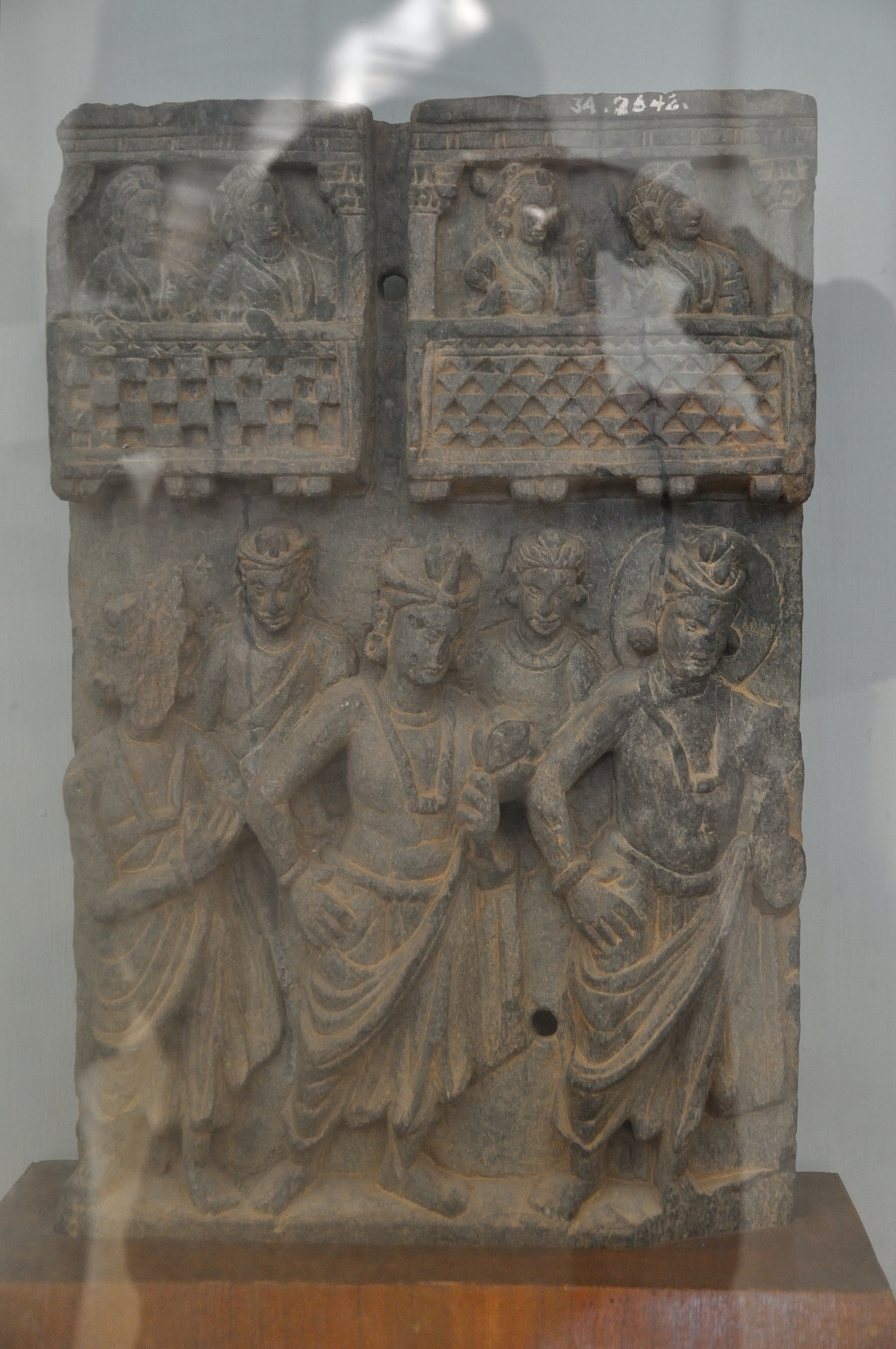
Relief depicting early form of Jharokha windows, 1st century CE

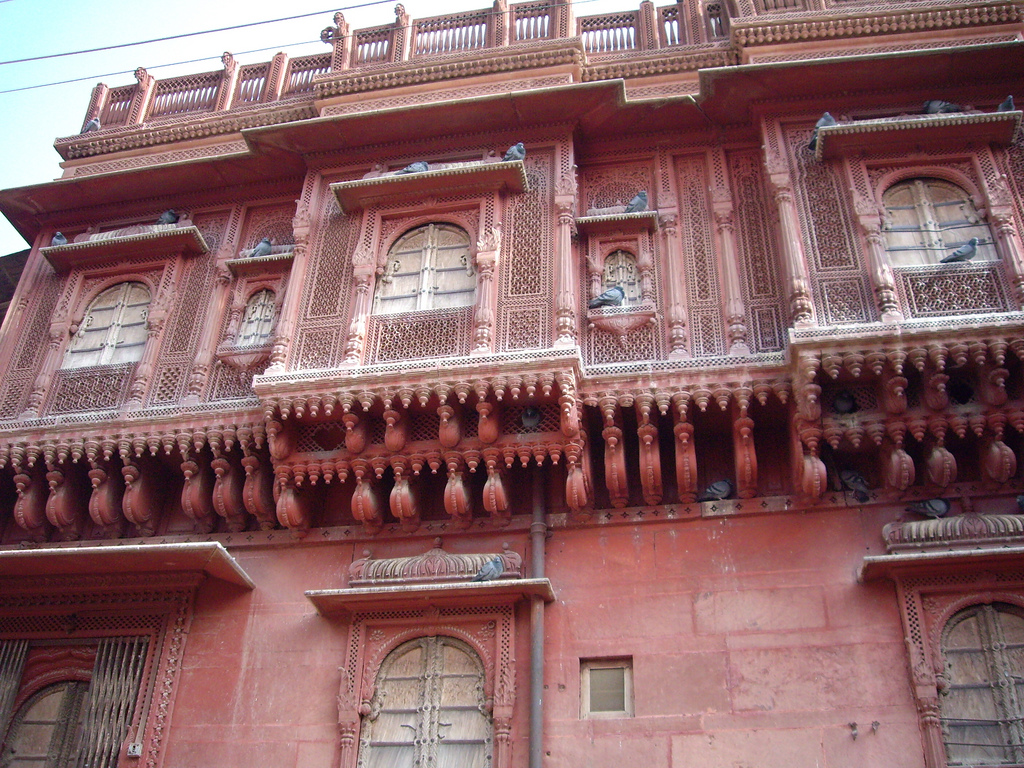
A haveli in Phalodi, Rajputana

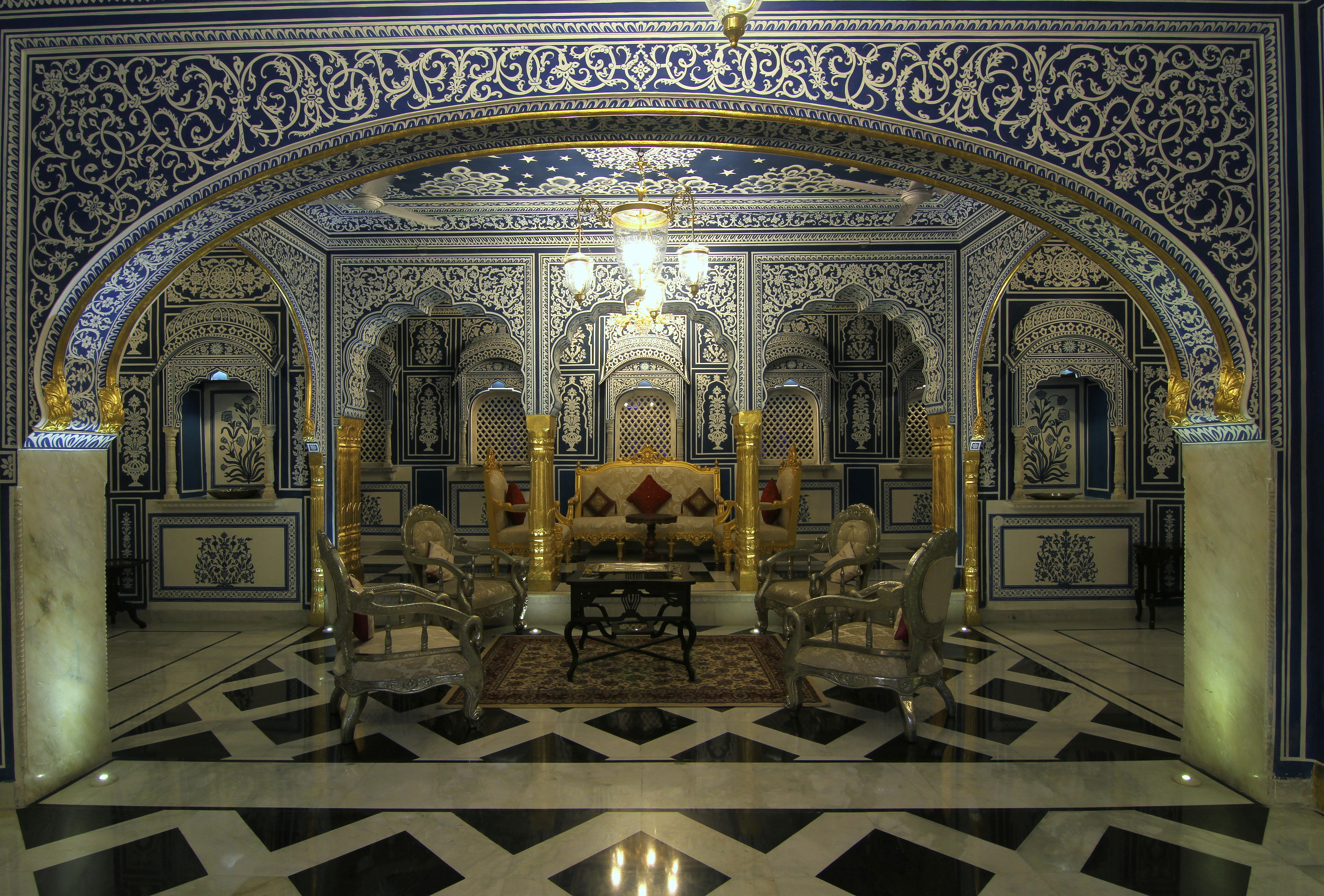
Badal Mahal at Shahpura Haveli, Shahpura, Rajputana

In the northern part of India, havelis for Lord Krishna with huge mansion-like constructions are prevalent. These havelis are noted for their frescoes depicting images of gods, goddesses, animals, scenes from the British colonization, and the life stories of Lords Rama and Krishna. The music here was known as Haveli Sangeet.

Later on, these temple architectures and frescoes were imitated while building huge individual mansions and now the word is popularly associated with the mansions themselves. Between 1830 and 1930, Marwaris erected buildings in their homeland Shekhawati and Marwar. These buildings were called havelis. The Marwaris commissioned artists to paint those buildings, which were heavily influenced by the Mughal architecture. Nangal Sirohi in Mahendragarh district, 130 km from Delhi, is popular for its havelis and architecture within NCR.

==== Ahirwati ====
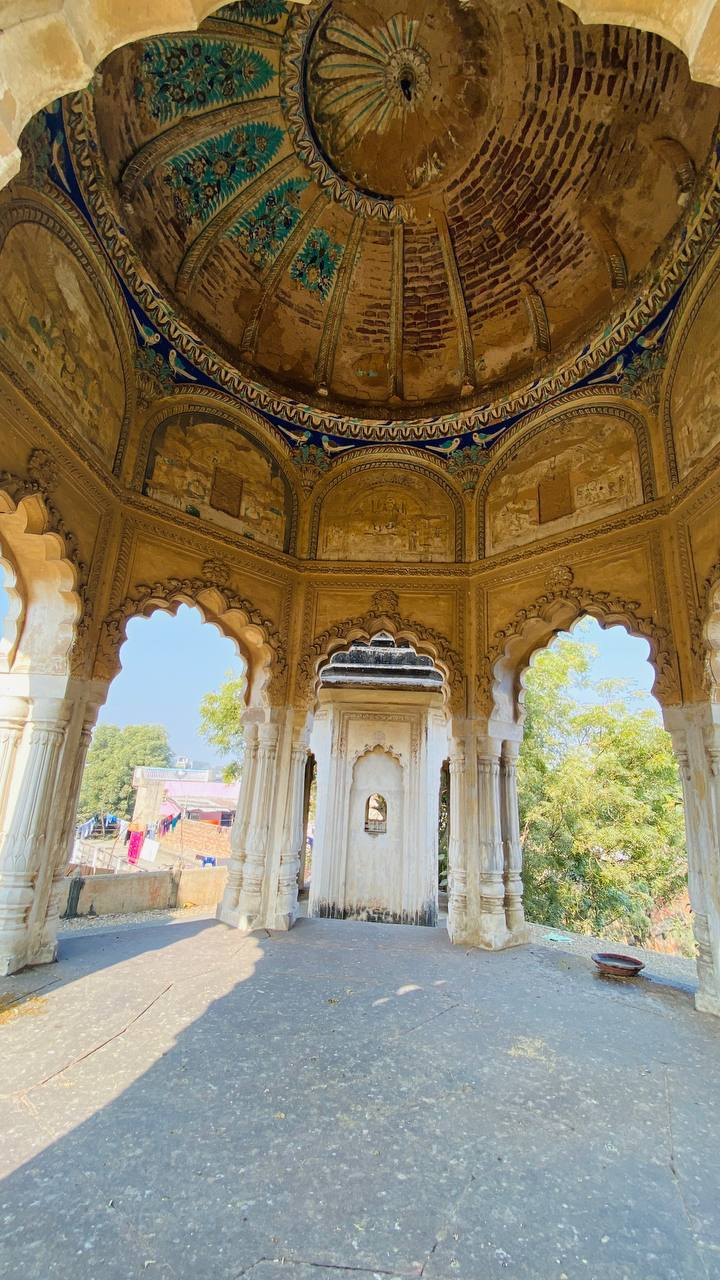
Frescoes developed during Raos Kings of Rewari.

The Ahirwati area of Haryana state also has big Havelis, such as the Rewari Rao Tej Singh Haveli, Rao Sawai Singh Haveli etc. The towns and villages of Ahirwal are as well famous for the embellished frescoes on the walls of their grandiose havelis depicting the Lord Krishna which was developed in late 17 Century to the point of still it will take time to becoming popular tourist attractions. In Rewari, the frescoes on Solahrahi and Tej Sarovar are very different from Shekhawati Frescoes.

==== Shekhawati ====
The typical havelis in Shekhawati in Rajasthan state incorporated two courtyards — an outer one for the men which served as an extended threshold, and the inner one, the domain of the women. The largest havelis could have up to three or four courtyards and were two to three stories high. Most of the havelis are empty nowadays or are maintained by a watchman, while others have been converted into hotels and tourist attractions. The towns and villages of Shekhawati are famous for the embellished frescoes on the walls of their grandiose havelis, to the point of becoming popular tourist attractions.

Shekhawati has one of the highest numbers of Havelis with 3 districts, Jhunjhunu, Sikar and Churu, alone having over 662 havelis. For the conservation, the Government of Rajasthan, has prepared the "Rajasthan Heritage Conservation Bill, 2025" and the Government of India also had undertaken projects costing Rs 124.13 crore.

Statistics on havelis of Shekhawati (c. 2025):

- Total: 662 havelis including 228 owned by non-resident Rajasthanis and the rest owner-occupied by the locals. 361 in good condition, 172 average, 29 dilapidated, and 64 in disputed ownership.
- Jhunjhunu: 278 havelis including 50 owned by non-resident Rajasthanis and the rest owner-occupied by the locals. 109 in good condition, 102 in average condition, 13 dilapidated condition, 54 disputed in ownership.
- Sikar, there are 272 havelis including 143 owned by non-resident Rajasthanis. 201 in good condition, 15 average, 46 in dilapidated condition, and 10 disputed.
- Churu: 112 havelis in the Churu district including 35 owned by non-resident Rajasthanis. 51 in good condition, 55 average, and 6 dilapidated.

==== Marwar ====
The havelis served as status symbols for the Marwaris of Rajasthan state as well as homes for their extended families, providing security and comfort in seclusion from the outside world. The havelis were designed to be closed from all sides with one large main gate.

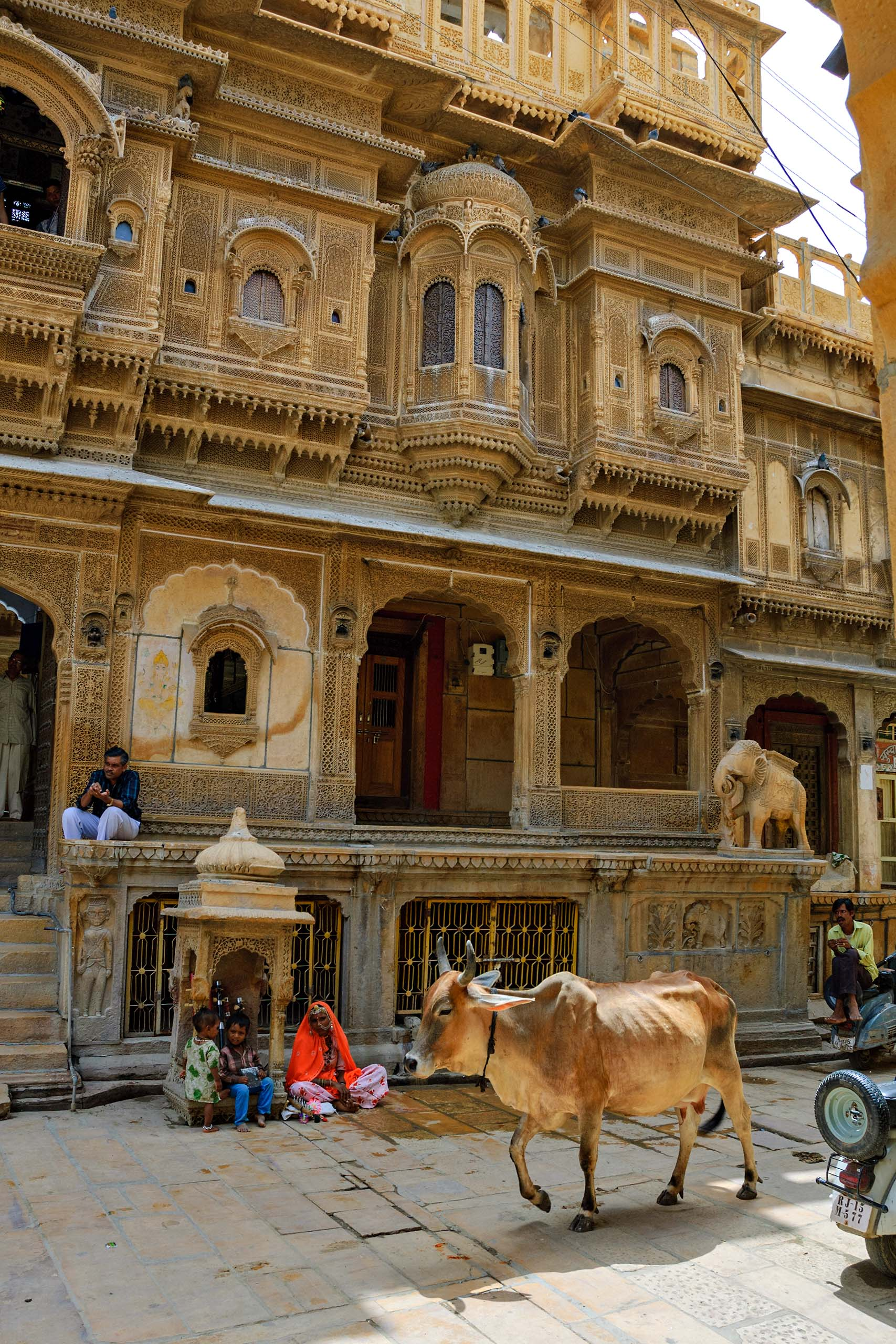
Nathmal-ki Haveli merchant house with a cow walking past, Jaisalmer, India

The havelis in and around Jaisalmer Fort (also known as the Golden Fort), situated in Jaisalmer, Rajasthan, of which the three most impressive are Patwon Ki Haveli, Salim Singh Ki Haveli, and Nathmal-Ki Haveli, deserve special mention. These were the elaborate homes of Jaisalmer's rich merchants. The ostentatious carvings, etched in sandstone with great detail and then painstakingly pieced together in lavish patterns, were commissioned to put on show the owner's status and wealth. Around Jaisalmer, they are typically carved from yellow sandstone. They are often characterized by wall paintings, frescoes, jharokhas (balconies) and archways.

The Patwon Ji ki Haveli was the first erected in Jaisalmer. It is not a single haveli but a cluster of five small havelis. The first in the row is the most popular, and is also known as Kothari's Patwa Haveli. Commissioned and constructed in the year 1805 by Guman Chand Patwa, then a rich trader of jewellery and fine brocades, it is the biggest and the most ostentatious of the five. Patwa was a rich man and a renowned trader of his time and he could afford and thus order the construction of separate stories for each of his five sons. These were completed in a span of 50 years. All five houses were constructed in the first 60 years of the 19th century. Patwon Ji Ki is renowned for its ornate wall paintings, intricate yellow sandstone-carved jharokhas (balconies), gateways and archways. Although the building itself is made from yellow sandstone, the main gateway is brown. Another notable haveli is Seth ji ri Haveli in Udaipur city; now known as Shree Jagdish Mahal, it is 250 years old.

=== Pakistan ===
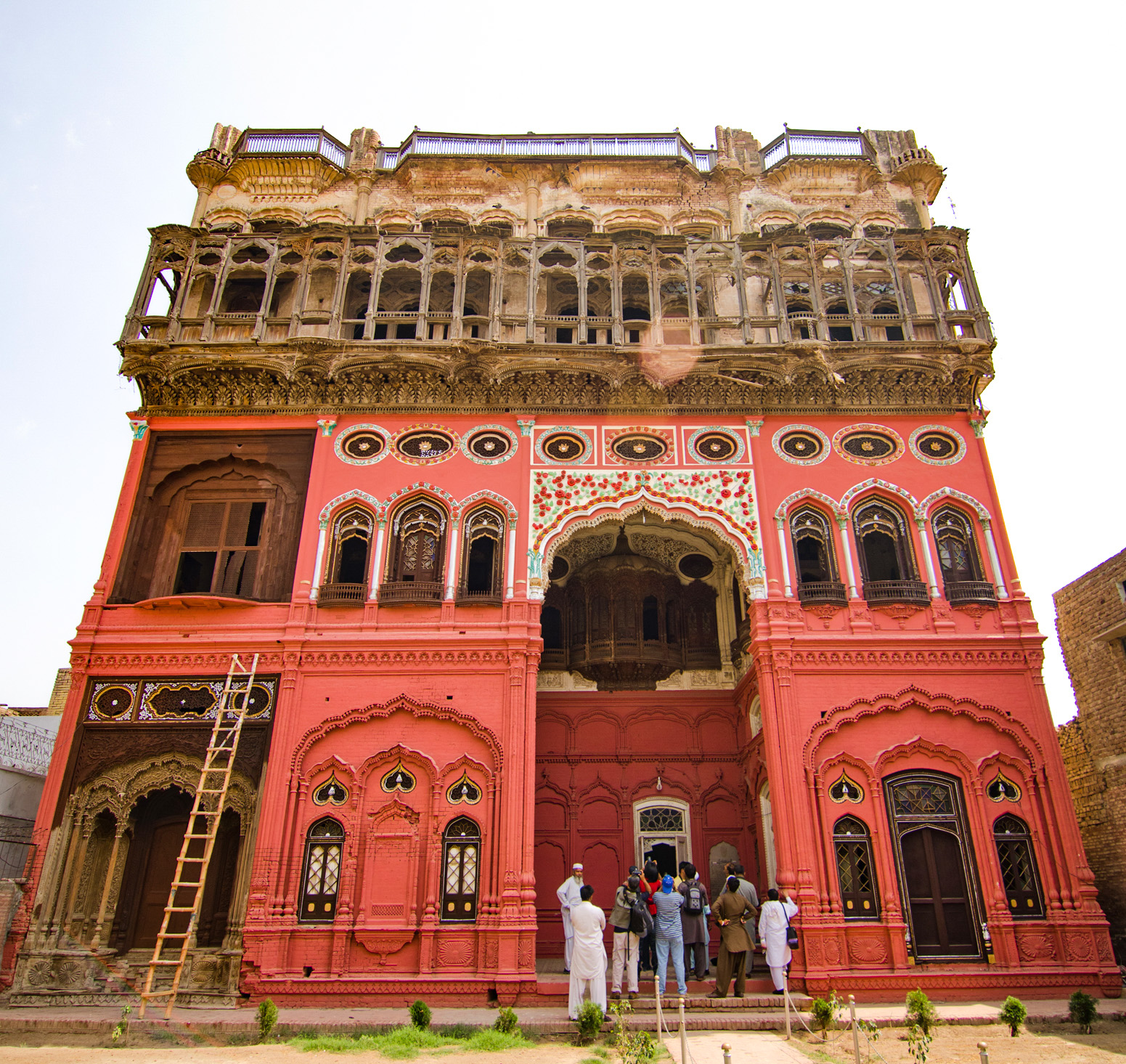
The Omar Hayat Mahal in Chiniot, Pakistan

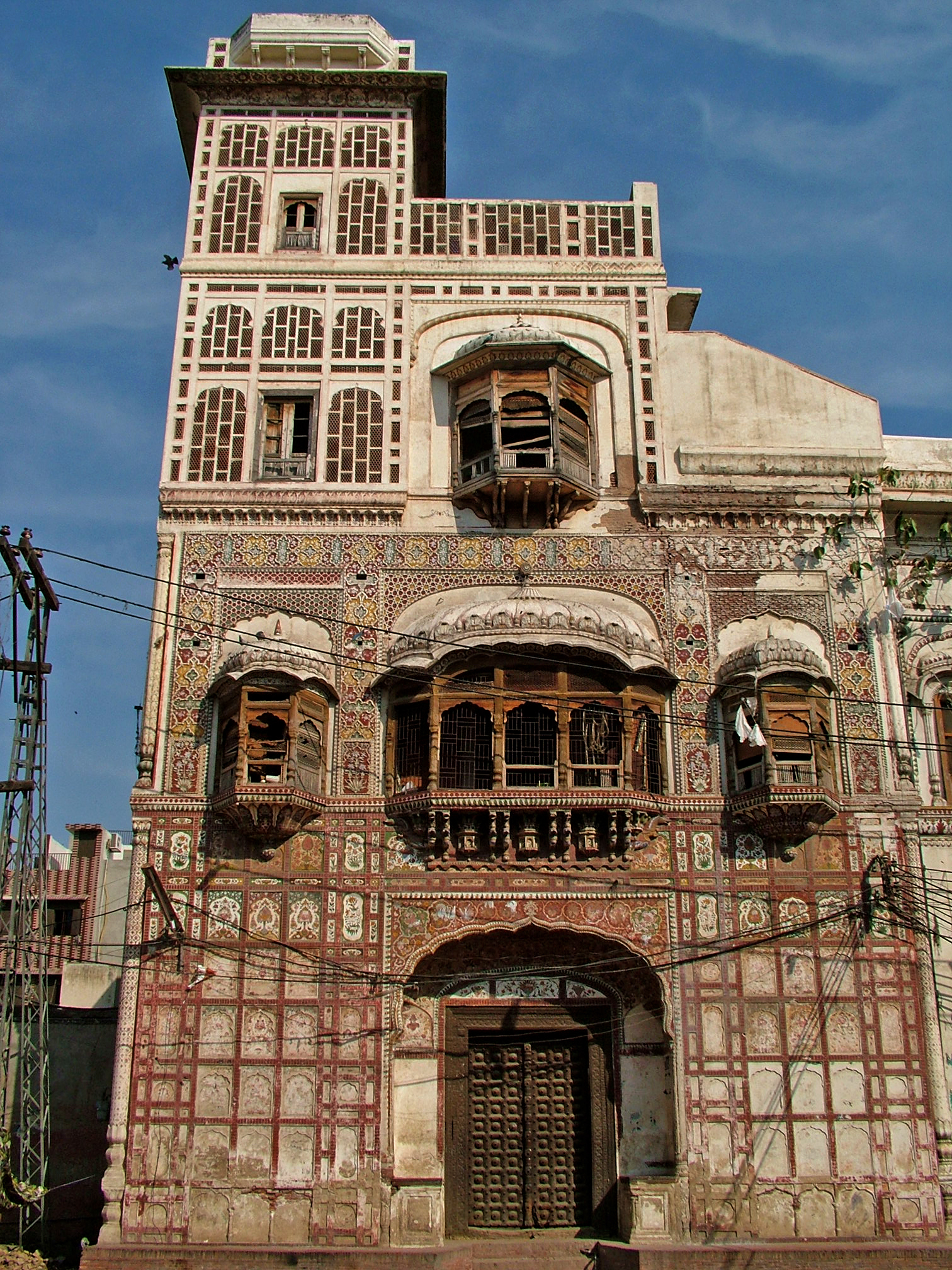
The Haveli of Nau Nihal Singh is a Sikh-era haveli in Lahore.

A number of historically and architecturally significant havelis survive in Pakistan, most of which are situated in the Punjab province. The most significant in Lahore, the Haveli of Nau Nihal Singh, dates from the Sikh era of the mid-19th century, and is considered to be one of the finest examples of Sikh architecture in Lahore. It is the only Sikh-era haveli that preserves its original ornamentation and architecture.

Some historically and architecturally significant havelis in Pakistan include:

- Kapoor Haveli in Peshawar
- Umar Hayat Haveli in Chiniot
- Sethi Haveli in Peshawar
- Dina Nath Haveli in Lahore
- Bedi Haveli in Rawalpindi
- Fakir Khana Haveli in Lahore
- Rang Mahal Haveli in Lahore
- Barood Khana Haveli in Lahore
- Lal Haveli in Rawalpindi
- Nau Nihal Singh Haveli in Lahore
- Sujan Singh Haveli in Rawalpindi
- Asif Jah Haveli in Lahore
- Man Singh Haveli in Jhelum
- Hari Singh Nalwa Haveli in Chakwal
- Choona Mandi Haveli in Lahore
- Haveli Awais Meer in Walled city Lahore
- Haveli Rani Jindan at the Lahore Fort in Lahore
- Haveli Wajid Ali Shah in Lahore
- Kharak Singh Haveli at the Lahore Fort in Lahore
- Mubarak Haveli in Lahore
- Saad Manzil in Kamalia
- Janjua Haveli in Malowal, Gujrat
- Gakhri Haveli in Gujrat
- Haveli Mubashar Ali Janjua in Matore, Kahuta, Rawalpindi
- Datar Kaur Haveli at the Sheikhupura Fort in Sheikhupura
- Havelis of the Mann Sardars of Mughalchak in Mananwala, Sheikhupura

== See also ==
- Walled City of Lahore
- Old Delhi
- Sethi Mohallah
- Jharokha
- Stucco
