= Kapurpur =

Kapurpur may refer to:

- Kapurpur, Pakistan, a settlement in Punjab, Pakistan
- Kapurpur, Jaunpur, a village in Uttar Pradesh, India
- Kapurpur, Raebareli, a village in Uttar Pradesh, India

== See also ==
- Kapur (disambiguation)
- Kapoor (disambiguation)
