= O. N. V. Literary Award =

Literary award for Indian writers

The O. N. V. Literary Award has been awarded annually by O. N. V. Cultural Academy since 2017 in memory of poet O. N. V. Kurup (1931–2016). The award is not limited to Malayalam–language authors but is a national award for which writers from across India are considered for their overall contribution to literature. The award comprises a statue, a citation, and a purse of ₹ 300,000.

== Recipients ==
Year	Recipient	Image	Jury	Ref.
2017	Sugathakumari		M. Leelavathy; C. Radhakrishnan; Prabha Varma	
2018	M.T.Vasudevan Nair		M. M. Basheer; K. Jayakumar; Prabha Varma	
2019	Akkitham Achuthan Namboothiri		C. Radhakrishnan; S. V. Venugopan Nair; Prabha Varma	
2020	M. Leelavathy		C. Radhakrishnan; Prabha Varma; Anil Vallathol	
2021	Vairamuthu		Anil Vallathol; Alankode Leelakrishnan; Prabha Varma	
2022	T. Padmanabhan		M. M. Basheer; George Onakkoor; Prabha Varma	
2023	C. Radhakrishnan			
2024	Pratibha Ray			
2025	Prabha Varma		M. Leelavathy; George Onakoor; Alankode Leelakrishnan	
2026	M. Mukundan			
