= Kappur (disambiguation) =

Kappur may refer to:

- Kappur, a village and gram panchayat in Villupuram district, state of Tamil Nadu, India
- Kappur (Palakkad district), a village and gram panchayat in Palakkad district, state of Kerala, India

== See also ==
- Kapur (disambiguation)
- Kapoor (disambiguation)
