= Akkitham Achuthan Namboothiri =

Indian writer (1926–2020)

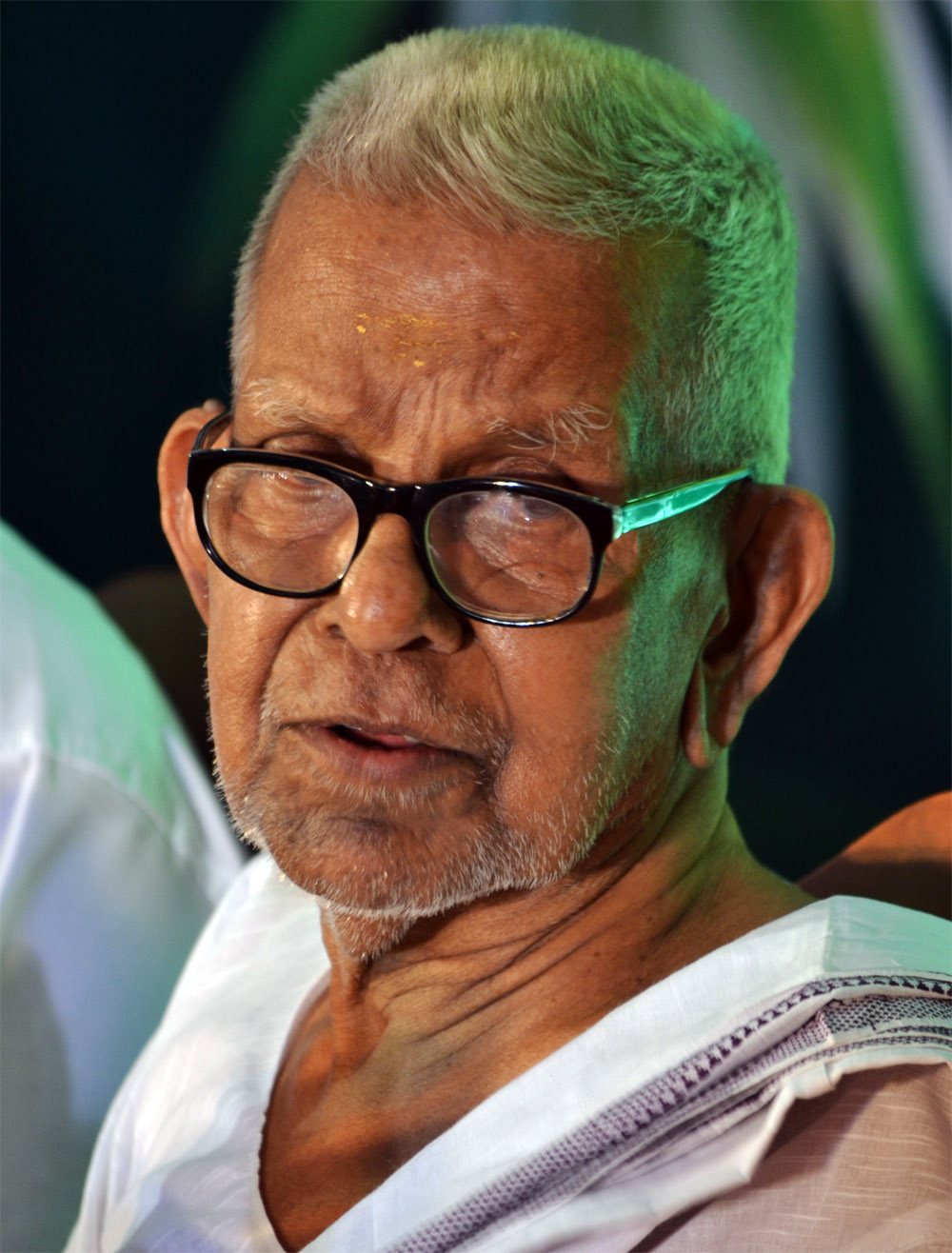
- Born: 18 March 1926; Kumaranellur, Ponnani taluk,Nowadays Pattambi taluk,Malabar District, Madras Presidency, British India
- Died: 15 October 2020 (aged 94); Thrissur, Kerala, India
- Occupations: Poet, social worker
- Relatives: Akkitham Narayanan, brother
- Writing career
- Pen name: Akkitham
- Language: Malayalam
- Notable works: Irupatham Noottandinte Ithihasam; Balidarshanam; Idinju Polinja Lokam
- Notable awards: Kerala Sahitya Akademi Award for Poetry (1972); Odakkuzhal Award (1973); Sahitya Akademi Award (1973); Aasan Prize (1994); Lalitambika Sahitya Award (1996); Vallathol Award (1997); Ezhuthachan Puraskaram (2008); Vayalar Award (2012); Padma Shri (2017); Jnanpith Award (2019); O. N. V. Literary Award (2019)
- Website: www.akkitham.in

Akkitham Achuthan Namboothiri (18 March 1926 – 15 October 2020), popularly known as Akkitham, was an Indian poet and essayist who wrote in Malayalam. He was known for a simple and lucid style of writing, exploring themes of profound love and compassion in his works. Some of his prominent works included Irupatham Noottandinte Ithihasam (English: Epic of the 20th century), Balidarshanam (English: The vision of Bali), and Nimisha Kshetram (English: Holy moment).

Akkitham was the recipient of India's highest literary honour, the Jnanpith Award in 2019, and other awards including Padma Shri, Ezhuthachan Award, Kendra Sahitya Akademi Award, Kerala Sahitya Akademi Award for Poetry, Odakkuzhal Award, Vallathol Award, Vayalar Award, Aasan Prize and O. N. V. Literary Award. He died on 15 October 2020, aged 94, in Thrissur.

== Early life ==
Akkitham Achuthan Namboothiri was born on 18 March 1926 at Amettikkara, near Kumaranellur in Palakkad district of the south Indian state of Kerala to Amettu Akkithathu Manayil Vasudevan Namboothiri and Checkur Manaykkal Parvathy Antharjanam. After schooling in Sanskrit, Astrology and Music, he started his college education but did not complete his graduate degree course. He is the first president of Thapasya (group of artists and literary fellows), an organization under RSS.

== Literary career ==
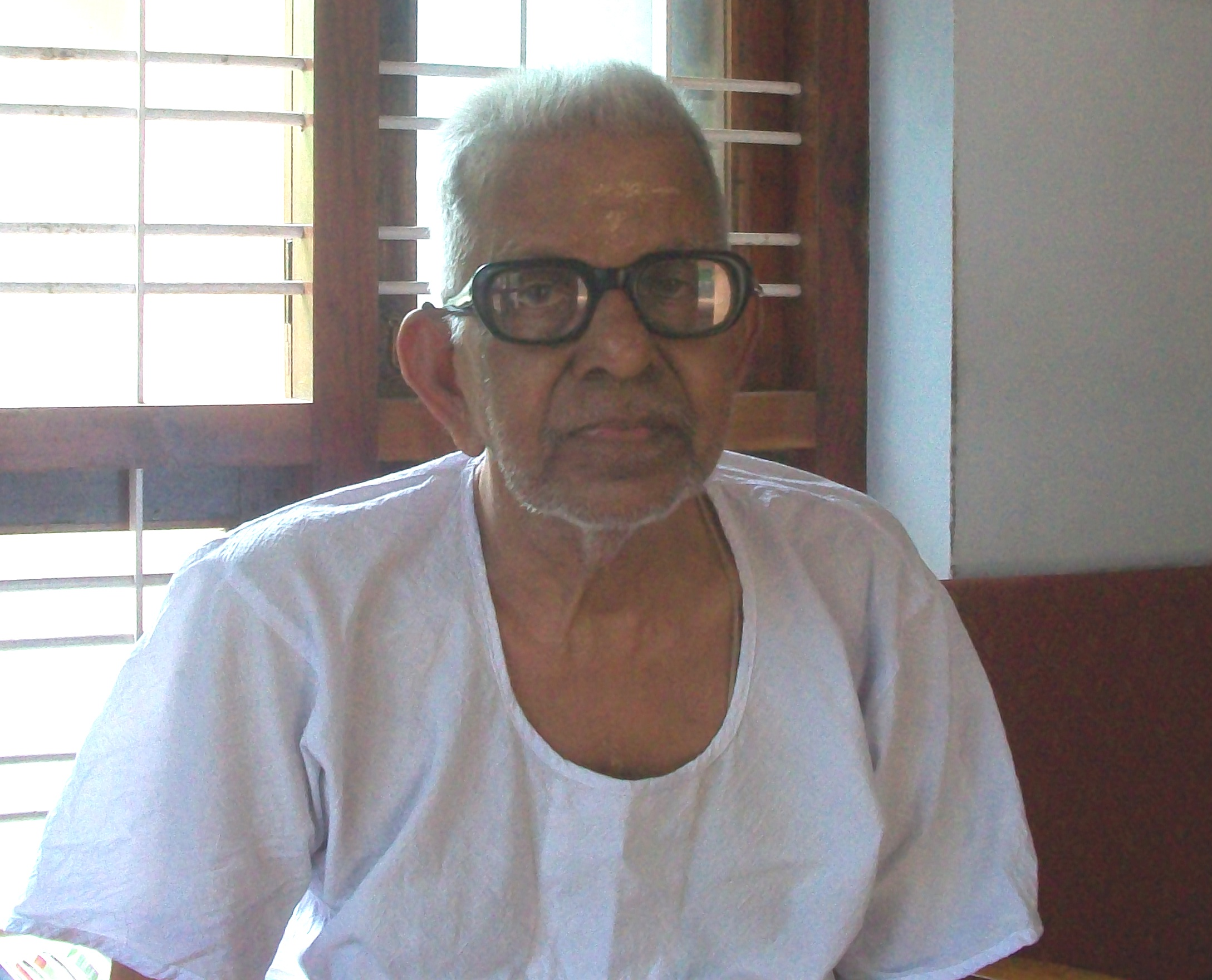
Akkitham in 2010

Akkitham started his career as an editor of Unni Namboothiri magazine, which he used as a platform for his social activities. He also worked as an assistant editor at Mangalodayam and Yogakshemam magazines. In 1956, he joined the Kozhikode station of the All India Radio (AIR) where he served until 1975 after which he was transferred to the Thrissur station of the AIR. He was also associated with Anaadi, a literary initiative for popularising studies of Vedas.

His literary works began to gain wide attention in the early 1950s and Irupatham Noottandinte Ithihasam (English: "Epic of the 20th Century"), a khandakavya is one of the first truly modernist poems in Malayalam literature, the book also won the Sanjayan Award in 1952. He published approximately 45 books comprising poetry anthologies, plays and short stories. Balidarsanam (English: "The Vision of Bali"), Arangettam, Nimisha Kshetram, Idinju Polinja Lokam, Amritaghatika, and Kalikkottilil are some of his notable poetry anthologies. Upanayanam and Samavarttanam, two collections of essays, feature among the writings in prose. Sree Mahabhagavatham, his translation of Srimad Bhagavatam, composed of 14,613 verses, covers over 2,400 pages. Some of the themes that Akkitham explored in his works included love and compassion. He is acknowledged to have introduced "meaningful modernism" as a central theme in his poetry.

Akkitham was involved in social reform activities and through his association with Yogakshema Sabha, he strived to bring in reforms in the lives of the Namboothiri Brahmins of Kerala. He was associated with various centres in Thirunavaya, Kadavallur and Thrissur, for the promotion of vedic studies. He was also associated with the Paliyam Satyagraha, a peaceful protest against untouchability in 1947.

== Awards and honours ==
Akkitham received the Sanjayan Award in 1952, for his work, Irupatham Noottandinte Ithihasam and the Kerala Sahitya Akademi Award for Poetry in 1971 for Balidarshanam. He received two major honours in 1973, the Sahitya Akademi Award for Balidarshanam and the Odakkuzhal Award for Nimisha Kshetram. He was selected for the Asan Smaraka Kavitha Puraskaram in 1994 and, two years later, for the 1996 Lalithambika Antharjanam Smaraka Sahitya Award, followed by the Vallathol Award in 1997.

The next major honour for Akkitham came by way of Vayalar Award which he received in 2012. The Government of Kerala awarded him Ezhuthachan Puraskaram, their highest literary award in 2008. He received Padma Shri, the fourth highest civilian award of the Government of India in 2017. He could not attend the investiture ceremony due to ill health and the award was later handed over to him by the district collector of Palakkad. In 2019 he received the O. N. V. Literary Award. He received the Jnanpith Award, the highest Indian literary award, in 2019. Reflecting on his lifetime contribution to Malayalam literature, the Jnanpith Award citation specifically noted him as "A poet of rare integrity" and noted that his poetry reflected "unfathomable compassion, imprints of Indian philosophical and moral values and a bridge between tradition and modernity, and delved deep into human emotions in a fast changing social space."

He was also a recipient of several other honours such as Krishna Geedhi Award, Nalappad Award(2012), Puthezhan Award, Deviprasadam Trust Award (2000), Moorti Devi Award of Bharatiya Jnanpith and Amrita Keerti Puraskar (2004). Arikil Akkitham is a documentary film directed by E. Suresh, which details the life of the poet from the perspective of his daughter, Sreeja.

== Personal life ==
Akkitham was married to Sreedevi Antharjanam and the couple had two sons, Narayanan and Vasudevan, and four daughters Sreeja, Indira, Parvathy and Leela. The family lives in Amettikkara. Antharjanam, died on 13 March 2019, at the age of 85. Noted painter Akkitham Narayanan is his younger brother.

Akkitham died on 15 October 2020, at the age of 94 in West Fort Hi-Tech Hospital in Thrissur. His funeral took place with full state honours at his home in Kumaranellur, on the same day.

== Bibliography ==
=== Poetry ===
- Akkitham (1971). Upanayanam. S.P.C.S. Archived from the original on 24 November 2020.
- Akkitham. Idinju Polinja Lokam: Kavithakal. Archived from the original on 24 November 2020.
- Akkitham. Samavarthanam. Archived from the original on 23 November 2020.
- Akkitham. Balidarsanam. Kottayam: S.P.C.S. Archived from the original on 24 November 2020.
- Akkitham (2002). Akkitham kavithakal: sampoorna samahaaram(1946-2001). Kottayam: Current Books. ISBN 9788124011157. Archived from the original on 23 November 2020.
- Akkitham (2013). Thiranjedutha Kavithakal. DC Books. ISBN 9788126423446.
- Akkitham (1997). Samanvayathinte aakaasham. Kottayam: D.C. Books. Archived from the original on 24 November 2020.
- Akkitham (1991). Sparsamanikal. Kottayam: D.C. Books. Archived from the original on 24 November 2020.
- Akkitham (1985). Amruthaghatika: Kavitha. Calicut: P. K. Brothers. Archived from the original on 24 November 2020.
- Akkitham (1980). Maanasa Pooja: Kavithakal. Archived from the original on 23 November 2020.
- Akkitham (1966). Oru kula mundiringa. Current books, Thrissur: Current Books. Archived from the original on 24 November 2020.
- Akkitham (1961). Sanjarikal. Current Books: Current Books. Archived from the original on 23 November 2020.
- Akkitham (1996). Slokapunyam. Akhila Kerala Akshara Sloka Parishath, Thrissur: Akhila Kerala Akshara Sloka Parishath, Thrissur. Archived from the original on 23 November 2020.
- Akkitham. Amrithaghadikam. Calicut: P.K. Brothers. Archived from the original on 23 November 2020.
- Achuthan Namboothiri, Akkitham (2013). Anthimahakalam (3rd ed.). Kozhikode: Mathrubhumi Books. ISBN 9788182657038. Archived from the original on 24 November 2020.
- Akkitham (1975). Kolaya Randu. National Bk Stall: National Book Stall. Archived from the original on 23 November 2020.
- Akkitham (1948). Prathikaradevatha. Mathrubhumi: Mathrubhumi. Archived from the original on 23 November 2020.
- Akkitham (1969). Karathalamalakam. Mangalodayam Ltd. Trissivaperur: Mangalodayam. Archived from the original on 23 November 2020.
- Akkitham (1966). Madhuvidhuvinusesham. Mangalodayam: Mangalodayam. Archived from the original on 24 November 2020.
- Akkitham (1969). Irupatham Noottandinte Ithihasam. Mangalodayam: Mangalodayam.
- Akkitham (1966). Sagarasangeetham. Mangalodayam: Mangalodayam. Archived from the original on 23 November 2020.
- Akkitham (1963). Madhuvidu. Mangalodayam: Mangalodayam. Archived from the original on 24 November 2020.
- Akkitham (1951). Manasakshiyude Pookkal. Mangalodayam: Mangalodayam. Archived from the original on 24 November 2020.
- Akkitham (1967). Oru Kudanna nilavu. Mangalodayam: Mangalodayam. Archived from the original on 23 November 2020.
- Akkitham (1947). Desasevika. Mangalodayam: Mangalodayam. Archived from the original on 24 November 2020.
- Akkitham (1965). Avathalangal. Mangalodayam: Mangalodayam. Archived from the original on 23 November 2020.
- Akkitham (1998). Ponnanikalari. Kottayam: Sahithya Pravarthaka Sahakarana Sankham, Kottayam. Archived from the original on 24 November 2020.
- Akkitham (1948). Prathikaradevatha. Yogakshemam Limited: Yogakshemam Limited.
- Akkitham (1990). Kalikkottilil. Trivandrum: State Institute of Children's Literature. Archived from the original on 24 November 2020.
- Akkitham (2016). Kedatha Sooryan. Sukapuram: Vallathol Vidyapeetham. Archived from the original on 24 November 2020.

=== Poetry translated into foreign languages ===
- Selected Poems of Akkitham: From God's Own country, translated into English by P.K.N. Panicker, New Delhi, Authors Press, 2018.
- The Berry in the Palm (Karatalamalakam), translated into English by Rizio Yohannan Raj, in: The Oxford India Anthology of Modern Malayalam Literature, vol. 1 (Poetry, Drama, Prose), New Delhi, Oxford University Press, 2017, pp. 89–93.

=== Essays and literary criticisms ===
- Akkitham Achuthan Namboothiri (2004). Kavithayile vruthavum chathuravum. Sukapuram: Vallathol vidyapeedham. ISBN 9788124014165. Archived from the original on 24 November 2020.
- Akkitham (1983). Vennakkallinde Kadha. Dakshina Books, Sukapuram: Dakshina Books, Sukapuram.
- Akkitham (1993). Hridayathilekku nokki ezhuthu. Sukapuram Vallathol: Sukapuram Vallathol. Archived from the original on 24 November 2020.
- Akkitham (2003). Southasasthra Parambaryam Keralathil. Kozhikode: Lipi Publications. Archived from the original on 23 November 2020.
- Akkitham (2014). Samskrithi:Akkithathinte therenjedutha lekhanangal. Calicut: Haritham Books. ISBN 9788192846989.
- Akkitham (2014). Smruthi:Akkithathinte therenjedutha lekhanangal. Kozhikode: Haritham Books. ISBN 9788192846996.
- Akkitham (2014). Sahithi:Akkithathinte therenjedutha lekhanangal. Kozhikode: Haritham Books. ISBN 9788192846972. Archived from the original on 24 November 2020.
- Achuthan Namboothiri, Akkitham (2011). Kavitha oru valiya sathyamanu. Kozhikode: Poorna. Archived from the original on 24 November 2020.

=== Children's literature ===
- Akkitham (1966). Ee Edathi None Parayu (Children's play). Mathrubhumi.
- Akkitham (1977). Akkithathinte Kuttikkavithakal. Archived from the original on 26 November 2020.

=== Translations ===
- Sarma, C. R.; Akkitham (1979). Thelumku kathakal. Kottayam: National Book Stall. Archived from the original on 24 November 2020.
- Sharma, C. R.; Akkitham (2010). Thelugu kadhakal:dhanagupthanenna kachavadakkarante athyarthi (2nd ed.). Kozhikode: Haritham Books. Archived from the original on 26 November 2020.
- Kusidhu Biddha Lokha (2022). Idinju Polinja Lokam: Kavithakal. by Dr. Sushma Shankar, Bangalore

=== Others ===
- Akkitham, ed. (1980). Samskrtha Malayala Nighantu. Archived from the original on 26 November 2020.

== See also ==
- Malayalam literature
- List of Malayalam-language authors
