= The Defog =

American indie rock band

- Origin: Philadelphia, Pennsylvania, United States
- Genres: Indie rock Electronic
- Years active: 1997–present
- Labels: Self Released
- Members: Charles Stieg; Nick Schuenemann; Jeff Hurtado; Zach Wirjosemito
- Past members: Louis Tumolo
- Website: http://www.thedefog.com/

The Defog is a Philadelphia-based indie rock band. Formed in 1997, The Defog consists of Charles Stieg (songwriting/guitar/vocals/engineer/production), Nick Schuenemann (songwriting/bass/organs), Jeff Hurtado (songwriting/piano/keyboard) and Zach Wirjosemito (songwriting/drums/sampler). The band's sound is made up of both electric and electronic instruments, ranging from Wurlitzer electric piano and Moog synthesizer to samplers and computer-driven loops and effects.

The Defog's 2004 EP, Sounds from the Stars, was the subject of much media praise. Music Connection Magazine wrote, "The catchy tunes, tight musicianship and spirited performances deserve a listen," giving it the top rating for the issue. 2 Walls Webzine wrote that the band, "...brews the indie-emo sensibility of Failure with synth hooks once perfected decades ago by The Cars."

As well as being in the running for 5 Grammy Nominations by Big Noise, including Best New Artist, the tracks "Downstream" and "Calibrated" were featured on MTV's "The Real World" as well as the MTV show "Meet the Barkers." This EP was also responsible for the band's Semi-Finalist position in Billboard's Independent Music World Series contest.

In 2006, the band released their second album Ebb and Flow, which had great media praise. Obscuresound.com wrote, "The Defog should not have a difficult time finding new fans as they tackle new cities, coasts, and countries." Pluginmusic.com wrote, "It is that piano sound, along with the band dabbling in electronics, that makes The Defog’s “Ebb And Flow” a versatile and varied album." The Daily Vault gave the album an A rating and wrote, "The Defog is every bit as refreshing as a new act full of promise can be."

In 2007, the band released the single, "All Paths Away," which played on national radio stations, as well as some international stations (UK & Germany). The band was also Clear Channel Music's Alternative Artist of the Week for the week of 10-29-07.

In April 2008, the band played an acoustic performance of the song "Loves Gone" on MTVs TRL in preparation for their next album release.

== Discography ==
=== EPs ===
- Sounds from the Stars CD (2004)

=== LPs ===
- Dying in Crosswalks CD (2002)
- Ebb and Flow CD (2006)
- Light Bright CD (2009)
- The Shadow Companion Digital Release (2011)
