= Kumaranellur =

- Village
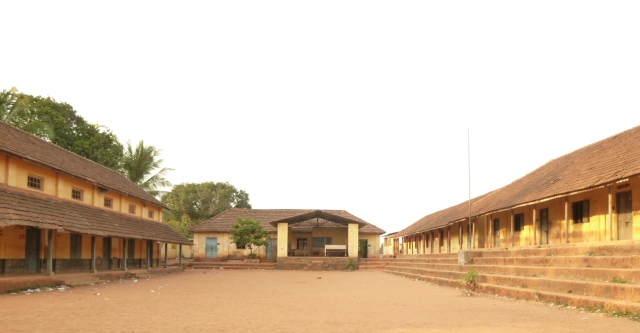
- GHSS Kumaranellur

- Location in Kerala, India Kumaranellur (India)
- Coordinates: 10°46′0″N 76°3′0″E
- Country: India
- State: Kerala
- District: Palakkad district

Population (2011)
  - Total: 7,553

Languages
  - Official: Malayalam, English
- Time zone: UTC+5:30 (IST)
- PIN: 679552
- Telephone code: 0466
- Vehicle registration: KL-09, KL52
- Nearest city: Palakkad
- Vidhan Sabha constituency: Thrithala

Kumaranellur is a small Village/hamlet in Pattambi Taluk in Palakkad District of Kerala, India. It comes under Kappur Grama Panchayath. It is located 75 km westwards from District headquarters Palakkad, 48 km southwards from the neighbouring district headquarters Malappuram, 27 km from Tirur, 22 km from Valanchery, 20 km from Pattambi, 20 km from Kunnamkulam, 15 km from Ponnani, 14 km from Kuttippuram, 8 km from Thrithala, and 5 km from Edappal town. This Place is in the border of the Palakkad District and Malappuram District. Malappuram District Kuttippuram is North towards this place and Edappal is westward from this place. Kumaranellur basically depends upon neighbouring Ponnani, Edappal, and Kuttippuram in Malappuram district for education and healthcare purposes. It is a part of Thrithala (State Assembly constituency) and Ponnani (Lok Sabha constituency).

== Local administration ==
The region is administered by the Kappur Grama Panchayat. It is composed of 18 wards:

Ward	Name	Party	Alliance	Member
1	Chekkode	INC	UDF	Noorul Ameen T. V.
2	Parakulam	INC	UDF	Smitha
3	Kalladathoor	CPI(M)	LDF	Geetha Jayanthi
4	Mavara	CPI(M)	LDF	Sindhu
5	Kappur	CPI(M)	LDF	Rahmath Mol
6	Pallangattuchira	CPI(M)	LDF	Sujitha
7	Mannaraparambu	IUML	UDF	Sakkeer
8	Mullamkunnu	CPI(M)	LDF	Rajani
9	Kozhikara	CPI(M)	LDF	Sivan
10	Kollannur	CPI(M)	LDF	Moosa
11	Kanjirathani	CPI(M)	LDF	Salma
12	Eravakkad	IUML	UDF	Shihab
13	Amettikkara	CPI(M)	LDF	Usha Kumari
14	Marayamkunnu	IUML	UDF	Ali M. V.
15	Kumaranellur	IUML	UDF	Noorul Ameen
16	Kallikkunnu	INC	UDF	Vimal
17	Kannamthali	IUML	UDF	Abdu Samad
18	Vellaloor	CPI(M)	LDF	Usha

== Notable residents ==
- V. T. Bhattathiripad, Dramatist and a prominent freedom fighter
- Maha Kavi Akkitham Achuthan Namboothiri (Jnanpit Award Winner)
- Thrithala Kesava Poduval, Thayambaka Maestro
- M. T. Vasudevan Nair, Malayalam Writer & Jnanpit Award Winner

== Demographics ==
As of the 2011 India census, Kumaranellur had a population of 7,553, consisting of 3,627 males and 3,926 females.
