= Akkitham Narayanan =

Indian painter

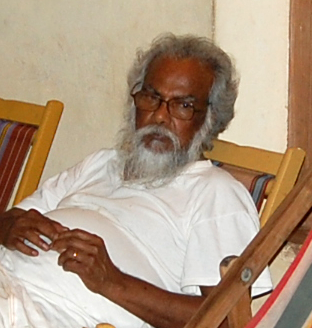
- Born: 1939 (age 86–87); Kerala, India
- Known for: Painter
- Awards: 1963 Lalit Kala Akademi, Chennai Award; 1965 Association of Young Painters and Sculptors Award; 1966 Lalit Kala Akademi, Chennai Award; 1972 Cagnes-sur-Mer International Painting Festival Award; 2009 Kerala Lalithakala Akademi K. C. S. Paniker Award; 2017 Kerala Lalithakala Akademi Raja Ravi Varma Award

Akkitham Narayanan (born 1939) is a Paris-based Indian painter from Kerala. A student of such artists as K. C. S. Paniker, D. P. Roy Choudhury and Jean Bertholle, Narayanan's paintings are on display at various museums and galleries in many countries such as India, France, Japan, Poland and Germany. He is a three time recipient of the Tamil Nadu State Lalit Kala Akademi Award, Raja Ravi Varma Award of the Kerala Lalithakala Akademi and the Cagnes-sur-Mer International Festival of Painting Award.

== Biography ==
Akkitham Narayanan was born in 1939 at Amettikkara, near Kumaranallur in Palakkad district of the south Indian state of Kerala to Akkithathu Manayil Vasudevan Namboothiri and Checkur Manaykkal Parvathy Antharjanam. In 1956, he joined the Government College of Fine Arts, Chennai from where he secured a diploma in 1961 and, on receiving a Government of India scholarship, he did advanced studies until 1964. His days at the Government College of Fine Arts gave him the opportunity to come in contact with D. P. Roy Choudhury, the then principal and K. C. S. Paniker, who was the vice principal of the institution, and Narayanan was also involved with Paniker's efforts to found Cholamandal Artists' Village in 1966. In between, he worked at Ethiraj College for Women for a short while, as a teacher of batik painting. He received another scholarship, this time from the Government of France, which assisted him to move to Paris to study at École des Beaux-Arts, where he studied until 1970; at the institution, he studied monumental art under Jean Bertholle and engraving under Lucien Couteau. Subsequently, he settled in Paris where lives.

Akkitham Achuthan Namboothiri, noted Malayalam poet, is Narayanan's elder brother.

== Awards ==
Narayanan received the state award of the Lalit Kala Akademi, Chennai, in 1963 and twice more in 1965 and in 1966. In between, he received the Association of Young Painters & Sculptors Award, sponsored by the Akademi in 1965 and in 1972, he received an award at 4th International Painting Festival, Cagnes-sur_Mer. Kerala Lalithakala Akademi awarded him the K. C. S. Paniker Puraskaram in 2009. The Akademi honoured him again with the Raja Ravi Varma Award to Narayanan in 2017. The Akademi has also produced a 27-minute documentary film on the life of the artist, which was directed by K. N. Shaji.
