= Haveli of Nau Nihal Singh =

Historic Haveli (historic mansion) in Lahore, Pakistan

Coordinates: 31.5795161°N 74.3109558°E

- نونہال سنگھ دی حویلی
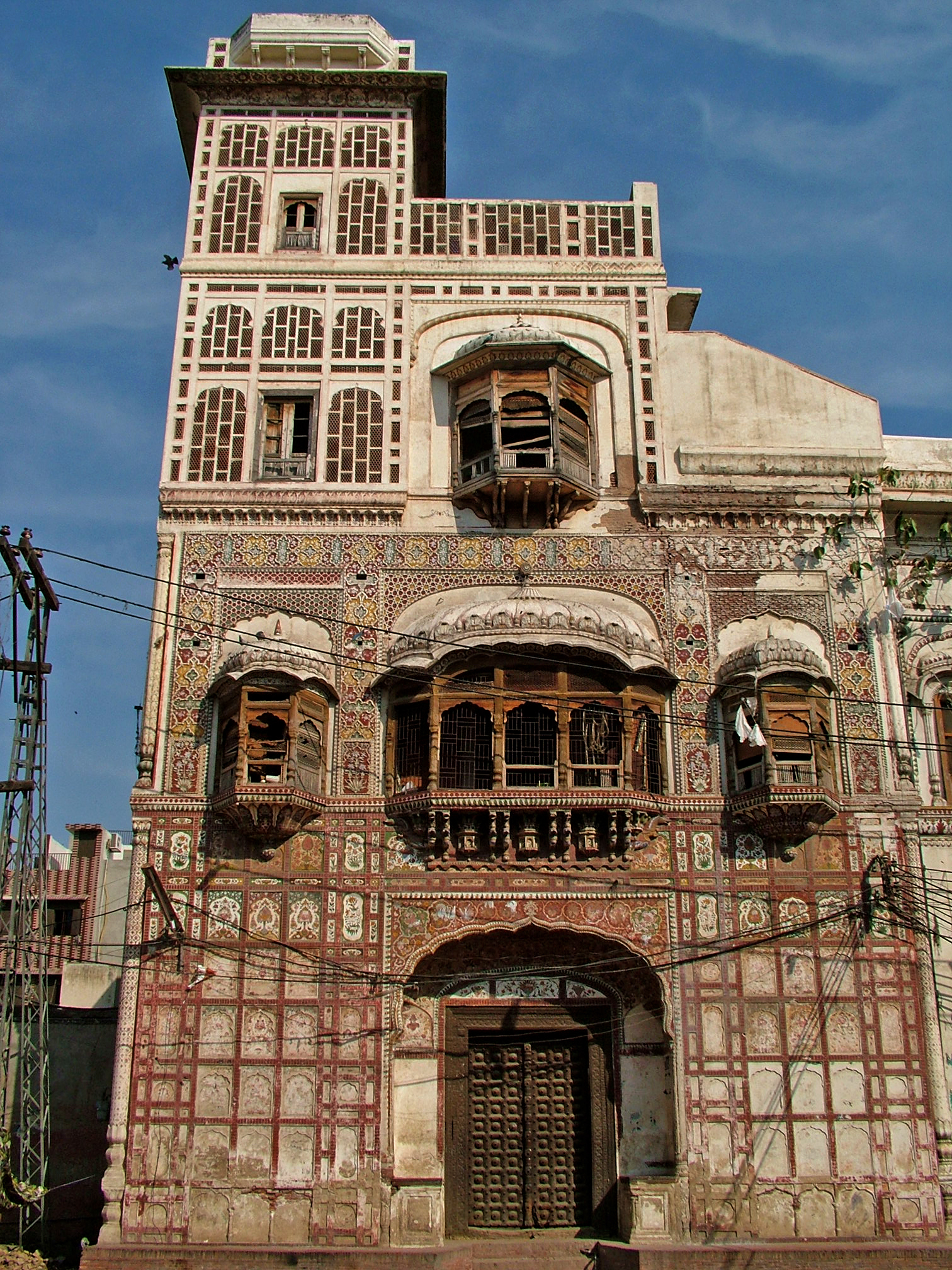
- The haveli's northwest façade is lavishly decorated.
- Interactive map of Haveli of Nau Nihal Singh
- Location: Lahore, Punjab, Pakistan
- Type: Haveli

The Haveli of Nau Nihal Singh (Punjabi: نونہال سنگھ دی حویلی), officially known as Government Victoria Girls' High School, is a haveli (mansion) that houses a government school located in Lahore, Punjab, Pakistan.

Dating from the Sikh era of the mid-19th century, the haveli is considered to be one of the finest examples of Sikh architecture in Lahore, and is the only Sikh-era haveli that preserves its original ornamentation and architecture. Nau Nihal Singh was a grandson of Maharaja Ranjit Singh.

== Location ==
The haveli is located within the Walled City of Lahore, near Mori Gate in the southern half of the walled city. The haveli is also near the Bhatti Gate and Lohari Gate.

== History ==
The haveli was built around late 1836-37 for Nau Nihal Singh, by his grandfather and founder of the Sikh Empire, Ranjit Singh. The mansion was intended to be a personal residence for Nau Nihal Singh. His grandmother, Datar Kaur, too played a considerable role in habilitation of the haveli.

In 1841 Nau Nihal Singh's widow, Bibi Sahib Kaur, delivered a stillborn son minutes before her own death. This prompted his mother, Chand Kaur to give up her claim as a regent to the golden throne of Punjab. The dowager Maharani retired to this haveli and received a pension of 900,000 rupees. However, her enemies still saw her as a threat and she was battered to death with wooden pikes by her servants on 11 June 1842.

The haveli has been used for over 100 years, since the British colonial era, to house the Victoria Girls' High School.

== Architecture ==
The base of the haveli is rectangular in shape, with its entrance on the western side. The façade is divided into two sections, with the portion housing the haveli's entryway profusely decorated with frescoes painted in the vivid Kangra style, and the other pierced with numerous windows.

A large jharoka balcony with sculpted brickwork and a small bulbous half dome is above the haveli's entry, which acted as a Jharoka-e-Darshan from which the Maharaja could view his subjects gathered below. The jharoka features 5 small arches, and is embellished imagery of winged humans, parrots, and frontally-viewed fish that are carved in a style which displays East Asian influences. The winged humans resemble both Islamic descriptions of angels, but also reflect influences of the mythical Hindu garuda. The base of the dome is decorated with a serpent-like figure which echoes the Hindu snake god Naga. The Jharoka-e-Darshan is flanked by two smaller jharokas. Each of the haveli's jharokas is decorated with a floral pedestal.

The building has four stories, and a basement level. The fourth level is made of a small room known as Rang Mahal ("Colour Palace"), or alternatively as Sheesh Mahal ("Mirror Palace"), with large screens that form a space in which to catch breezes. The remaining floors were built with high ceilings, to exaggerate the height of the structure in order to give the appearance of a citadel, rather than a private residence.

The ceilings of the haveli are made of decorated wood inlaid with glass and mirror, as well as sun-motifs in the central portion of the roof. Walls within the haveli are decorated with false arches that each contain a small 457.2 mm by 457.2 mm painting, with blues, golds, reds, and oranges dominating the haveli's colour palette. The interior is also decorated with carved wood, brickwork, and floral frescoes.

The haveli features a large 2-storied inner courtyard which was also profusely decorated - the bottom level of which has since been whitewashed. In front of the haveli is a small plaza known as Maydan ka Bhaiyan that was once used as the haveli's garden.

== Conservation ==
The haveli is protected by the Antiquities Act 1975.

== Gallery ==
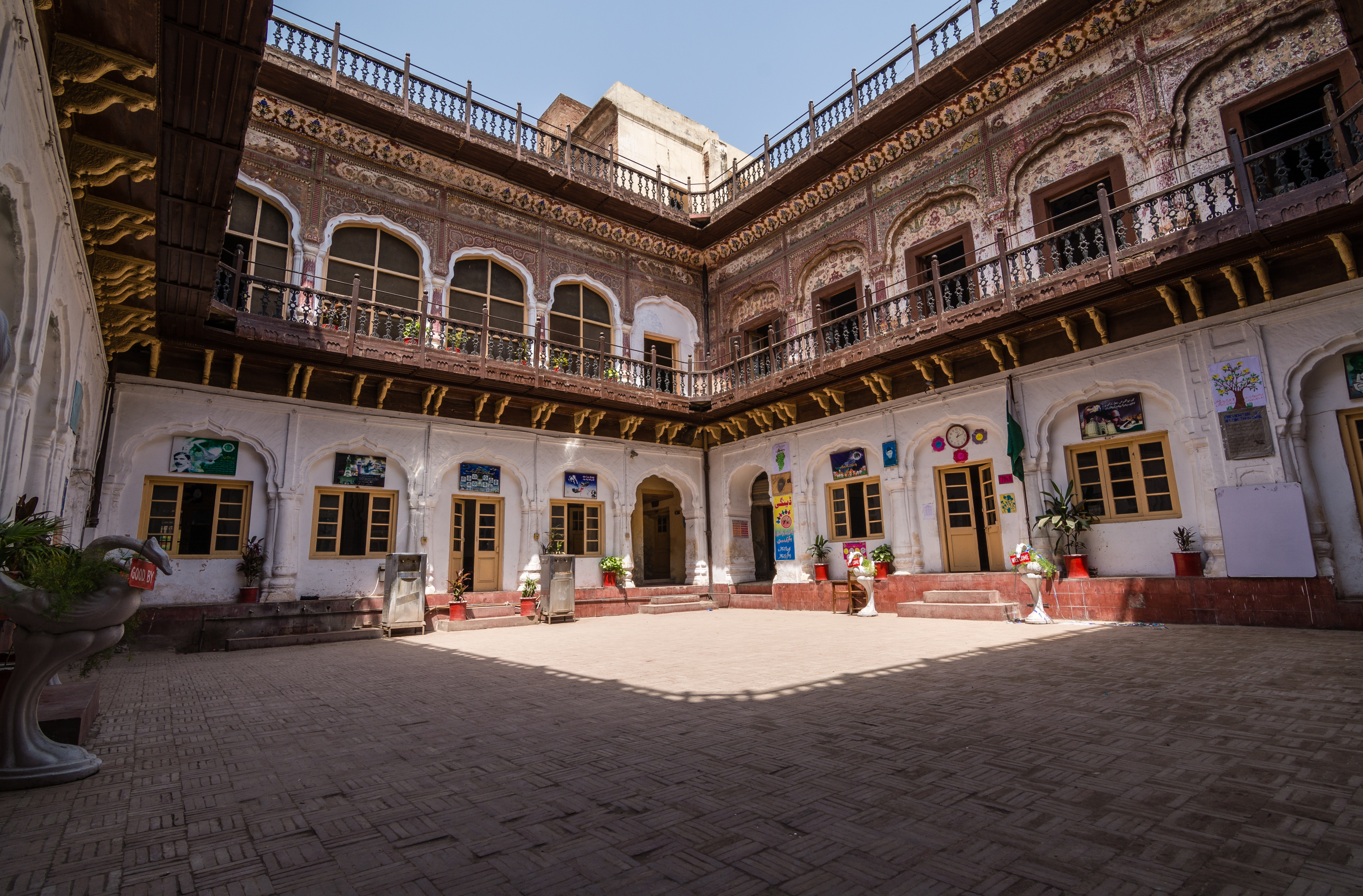
The haveli's inner courtyard

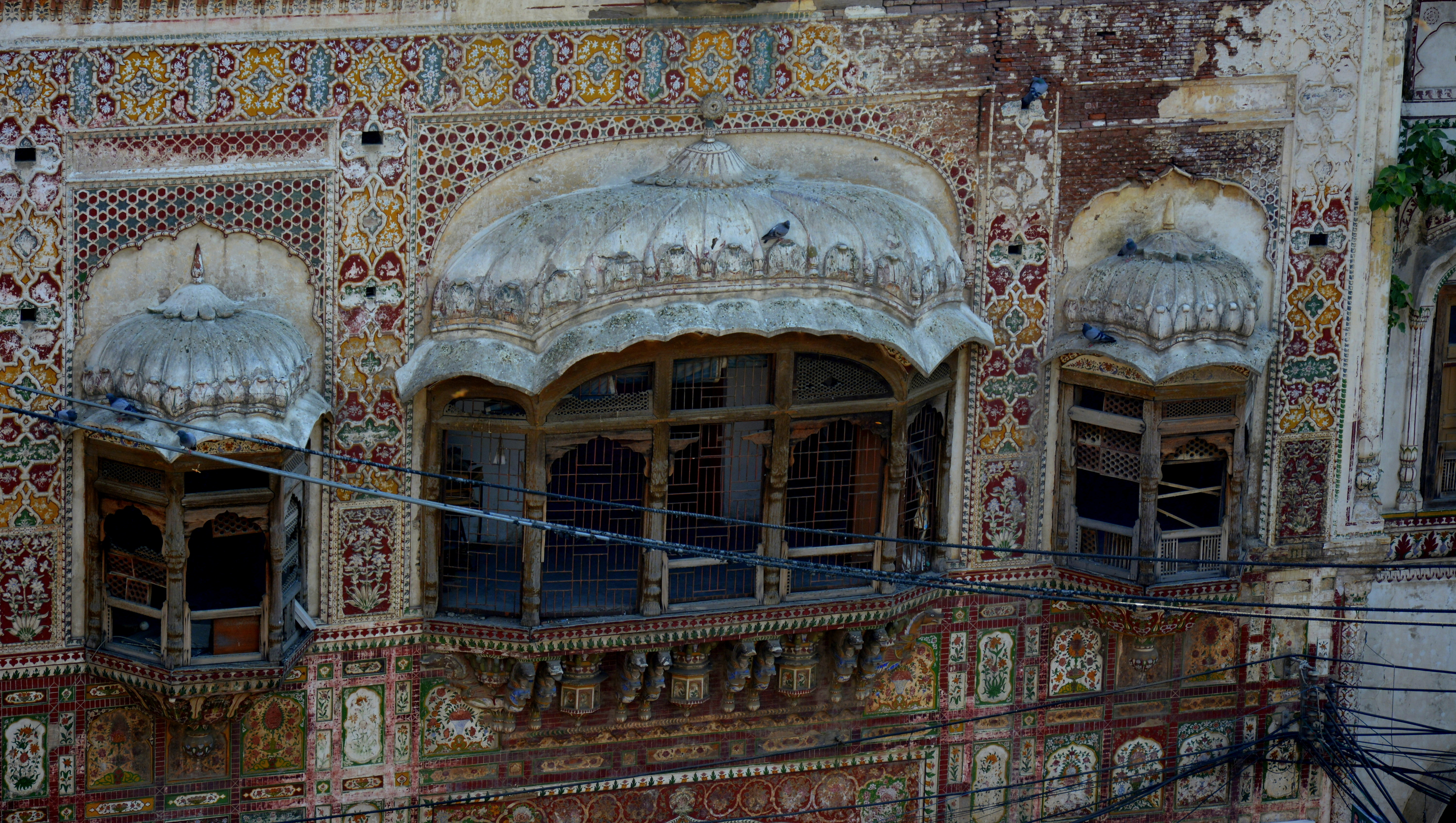
The haveli's large jharoka-e-darshan

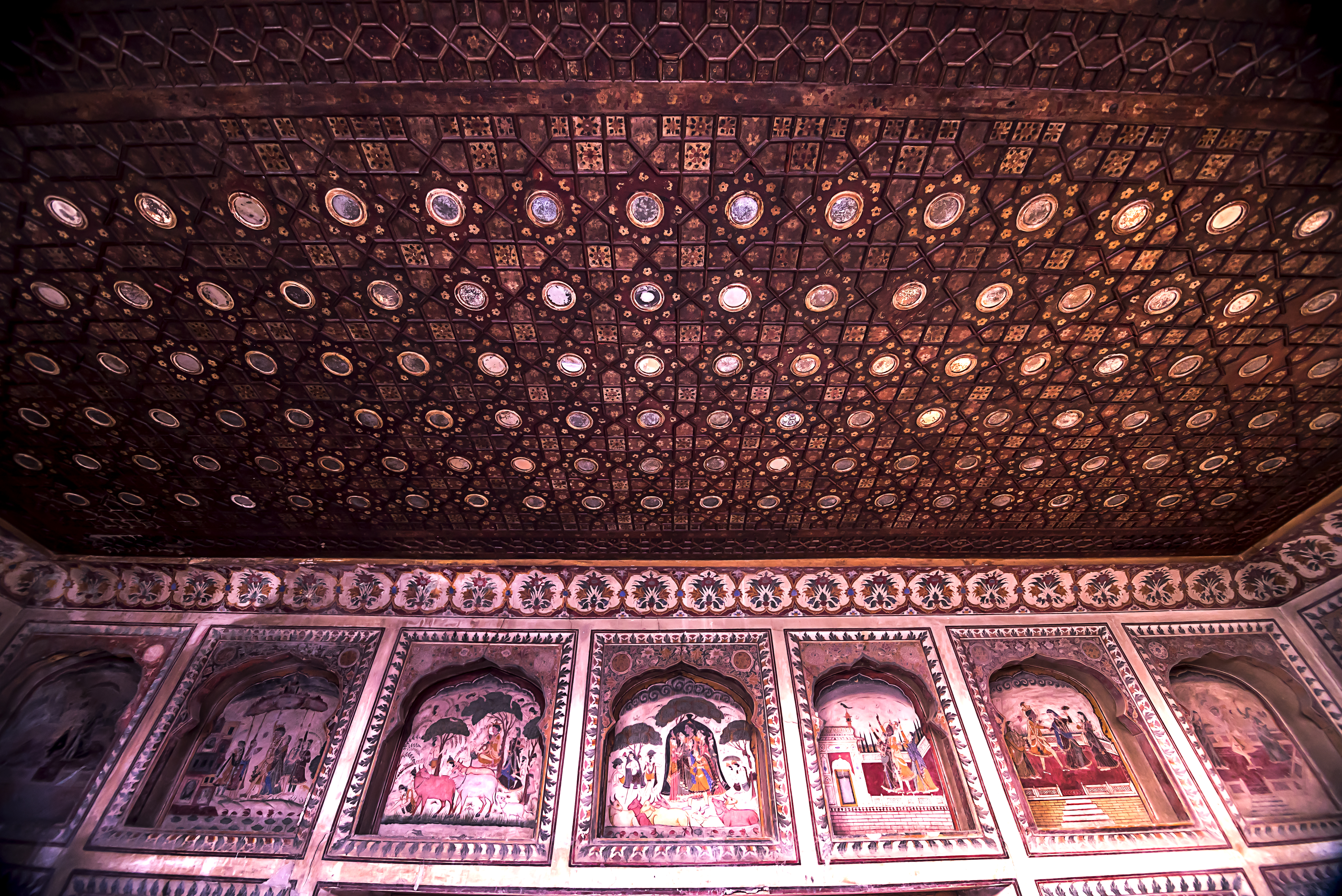
The haveli's ceiling is made of carved and inlaid wood

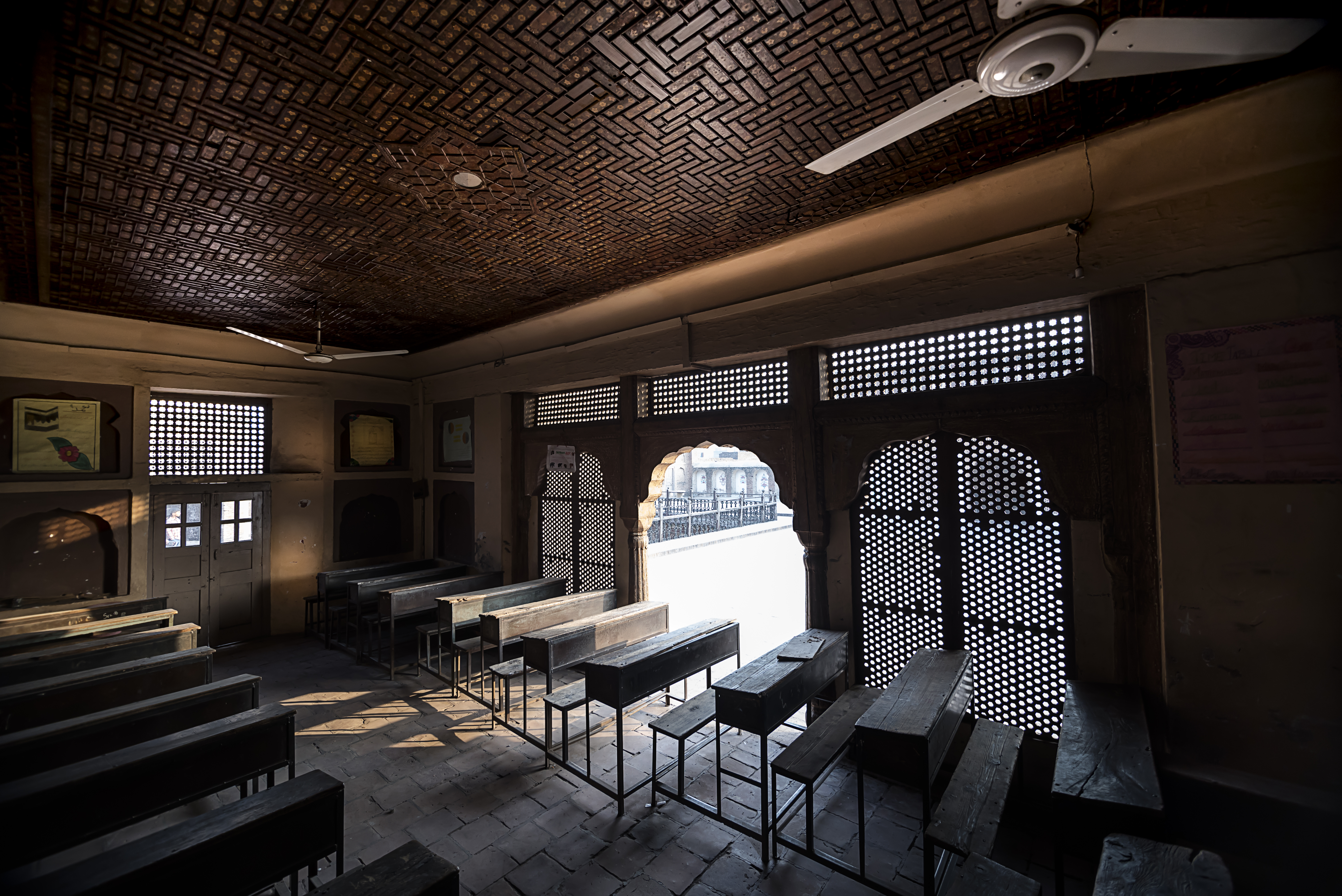
Rooms in the haveli are used as classrooms

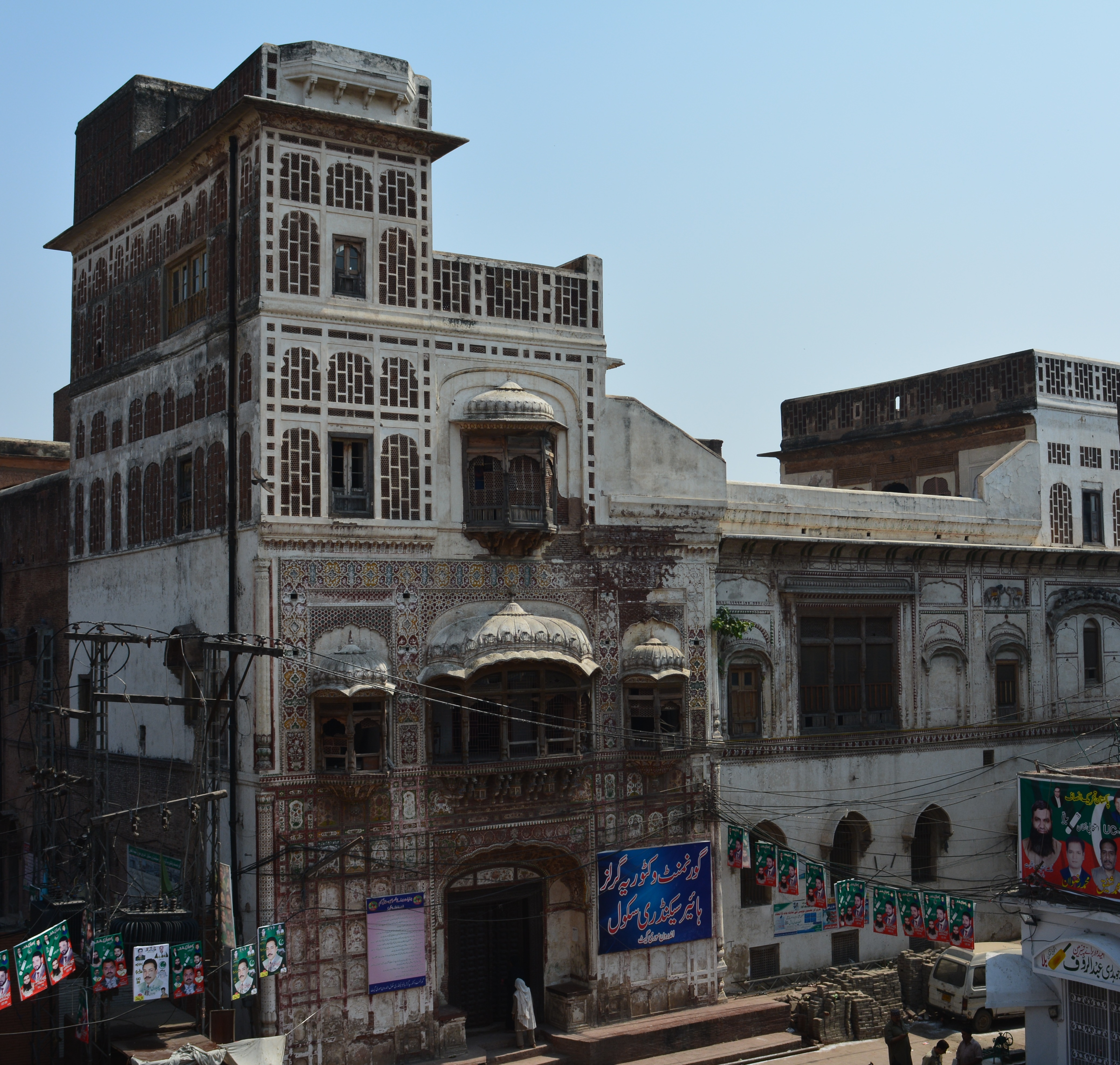
A view of the entire western façade

== See also ==
- House of Dilip Kumar, Peshawar
- Kapoor Haveli
