= Kapurpur, Jaunpur =

Kapurpur
- Village
- Location within Uttar Pradesh Location within India
- Coordinates: 25.8136°N 82.4625°E
- Country: India
- State: Uttar Pradesh
- District: Jaunpur
- Elevation: 86 m (282 ft)

Population (2011 Census)
  - Total: 555

Languages: Awadhi, Hindi
- Time zone: UTC+5:30 (IST)
- Postal code: 222141
- Vehicle registration: UP 62

Kapurpur is a small village in the Jaunpur district of the Indian state of Uttar Pradesh. It is under the local administration of Kapurpur Panchayath in the Varanasi division. The village is located 27 kilometres (17 mi) west of district headquarters in Jaunpur, 9 kilometres (5.6 mi) from Baksha, and 222 kilometres (138 mi) from state capital Lucknow.

Kapurpur's pin code is 222141.

== See also ==
- Jaunpur (Lok Sabha constituency)
- Malhani (Assembly constituency)
- Khunshapur
