= Kapur (disambiguation) =

Kapur is an Indian and Pakistani surname of Punjabi origin.

Kapur may also refer to:

- Kapur (wood), a South-east Asian dipterocarp hardwood
- 9141 Kapur, an asteroid
- Kapur, West Kalimantan is an Indonesian town in West Kalimantan

== See also ==
- Kapoor (disambiguation)
- Kappur (disambiguation)
- Kapuram (disambiguation)
- Kapurpur (disambiguation)
- Kapur Commission, a commission of inquiry into the assassination of Gandhi
- Camphor, a white transparent solid widely used in religious ceremonies in Hinduism
- Kot Kapura, a city in Punjab, India
