= David Vogel (author) =

Jewish writer and poet (1891–1944)

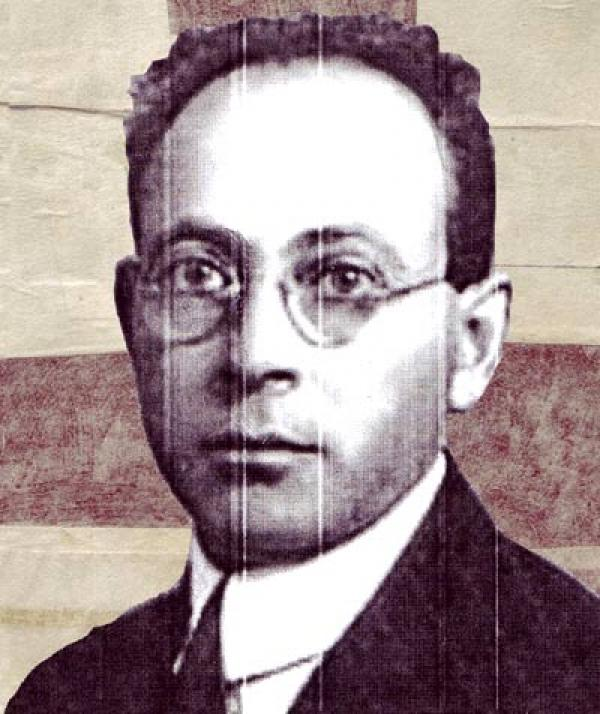
- Born: May 15, 1891; Sataniv, Podolia Governorate, Russian Empire (present-day Ukraine)
- Died: March 10, 1944 (aged 52); KZ Auschwitz, Gau Upper Silesia, Nazi Germany (present-day Poland)
- Occupation: Novelist

David Vogel (Hebrew: דוד פוגל; May 15, 1891–1944) was a Ukrainian-born Jewish poet, novelist, and diarist.

== Biography ==
David Vogel was born in the town of Sataniv in the Podolia region in the Russian Pale of Settlement. The family spoke Yiddish. In 1909–1910, he arrived in Vilnius as a yeshiva student. He worked as the caretaker of a synagogue and studied Hebrew. Moving to Vienna in 1912, he spent his time sitting in cafes and teaching Hebrew to make ends meet. He accepted a job copying letters for the Zionist federation but soon quit. During World War I he was arrested as a Russian enemy alien and spent time in internment camps. Towards the end of the war, he began publishing impressionist poems.

In 1919, he married Ilka, who became ill with tuberculosis. In 1925, he settled in Paris, where he wrote prose and poetry. In 1929, he and his second wife, Ada Nadler, immigrated to Palestine, where their daughter, Tamara, was born. After spending time in Poland and Berlin, the family returned to Paris. When World War II erupted, Vogel and his daughter fled to southeastern France where Ada was recuperating in a sanatorium. He was interned as an Austrian citizen and freed in 1940 when the Nazis occupied France.

Various stories circulated about his life after that. In 1944–45, the Hebrew newspapers in Palestine reported his "disappearance." He was presumed to have died in the Holocaust.Israeli literary scholar Dan Pagis discovered that he returned to Hauteville after his release from internment camp. In 1944, he was arrested by the Gestapo, imprisoned in Lyon, and sent to Drancy, a transit camp for French Jews. Four days later, he was murdered in Auschwitz.

== Literary career ==
Among his works are collections of poems in free meter and several novels edited posthumously by Menachem Perry. His diaries covering the period 1912–1922 were published as The End of the Days. The novel Married Life was written between 1928 and 1929. The novel was re-published in Israel in 1986, in a new version edited from the manuscripts by Menachem Perry, and became a best-seller. A semi-autobiographical novel, written in Yiddish and published in Hebrew as They All Went Out to Battle, is a Kafkaesque/carnivalesque depiction of deliberate, radical self-isolation in the French concentration camp. The Hebrew publication is a version prepared by Menachem Perry, who made a short novel out of hundreds of pages of the Yiddish manuscript.

The only book of poems he published in his lifetime was Lifney Hasha'ar Ha'afel ("Before the Dark Gate"), in Vienna in 1923, but his poetry was influential with other Hebrew poets in the 1950s.

The critic Yael S. Feldman cites Vogel as an example in which bilingualism affected modern Hebrew poetry.

New studies points to a mistake that has been accepted for years concerning the sources of influence and correspondence of the prose works written by Vogel; In the past it was customary to categorize Vogel as a European writer who happened to write in the Hebrew language, but now it is more clear that Vogel's work was connected to and influenced by a long line of Jewish writers who also wrote in the Hebrew language.

== Published works ==
- Lifnei Sha'ar ha-Afel (70 poems), Vienna (1923)
- Le-ever ha-Dmamah (78 poems), posth. ed. Tel Aviv (1983)
- They All Went Out to Battle (Yiddish)
- In the Sanatorium (1927)
- Facing the Sea, Paris (1932)
- Married Life (1929; Menakhem Perry's version 1986)
- Viennese Romance (c. 1937-1938; posth. ed. Tel Aviv 2012)
- Extinguished Stations (ed. Menakhem Perry) (1990)

== See also ==
- Hebrew literature
- Yiddish literature
