= Meet the Barkers =

- Genre: Reality
- Directed by: Alan Finn; Cameron Glendenning
- Starring: Travis Barker; Shanna Moakler
- Theme music composer: Peter Perrett
- Opening theme: "Another Girl, Another Planet" by Blink-182
- Country of origin: United States
- Original language: English
- No. of seasons: 2
- No. of episodes: 16

Production
- Executive producers: Rod Aissa; Lois Clark Curren; Marcus J. Fox; Melanie Graham; Jesse Ignjatovic
- Producer: Nate Hayden
- Running time: 30 mins.

Original release
- Network: MTV
- Release: April 6, 2005 – February 7, 2006

Meet the Barkers is a reality television series that aired on MTV from 2005 to 2006. The series follows drummer Travis Barker, his then-wife, actress and former beauty queen Shanna Moakler, and their children as they navigate family life, marriage, and their respective careers.

Developed by Barker and producer Jesse Ignjatovic amid the popularity of celebrity reality television, the largely unscripted program also documented Barker's musical endeavors, including Blink-182, and his business ventures, such as his clothing company Famous Stars and Straps. The series also featured Moakler's daughter Atiana, from her previous relationship with boxer Oscar De La Hoya, and the couple's children Landon and Alabama.

Meet the Barkers lasted two seasons, airing 16 episodes. The couple's subsequent separation attracted media attention, with Moakler later suggesting that the experience of filming the series had contributed to the deterioration of their relationship.

== Background ==
Meet the Barkers was developed during the early-2000s popularity of celebrity reality television, following the success of MTV programs such as The Osbournes and Newlyweds: Nick and Jessica. The series originated from a conversation between Blink-182 drummer Travis Barker and television producer Jesse Ignjatovic, a longtime friend who had previously worked with the band on MTV's Diary and directed music videos for Barker's side project, Transplants. Barker and his then-wife, actress and former Miss USA Shanna Moakler, had considered documenting their family life, and Ignjatovic filmed a pilot shortly after Barker proposed the idea.

MTV announced the series in January 2005, initially ordering ten episodes. The program followed the couple as they adjusted to married life, raised their children, and balanced domestic responsibilities with their respective careers. Filming included their wedding, their move into a new home, and Barker's musical and business ventures, including his clothing company Famous Stars and Straps. In his memoir, Barker wrote that he sought to present a more personal side of himself beyond his public image as Blink-182's drummer, particularly his experiences as a father.

== Production ==
The series was largely unscripted. Approximately twenty cameras were installed throughout the couple's Bel Air home, allowing the production crew to capture their activities with minimal interruption. In a later interview, Barker recalled that filming rarely felt intrusive, attributing his comfort to his friendship with Ignjatovic and the familiarity he developed with the crew.

In addition to Barker's business ventures, the series documented his music career, including his work with Blink-182. The band recorded a cover of "Another Girl, Another Planet", originally by English power pop group the Only Ones, as the program's theme song. The recording sessions are depicted in the seventh episode, "Thanksgiving", and marked the band's final studio recording before its 2005 breakup. The show's production contributed to existing tensions within the group; guitarist Tom DeLonge was reportedly uncomfortable with the constant presence of television cameras. Following the band's breakup, the second season documented Barker's other musical endeavors, including the formation of +44, his new project with Blink-182 bassist Mark Hoppus.

Barker credited the program with expanding his public profile, attracting collaborations with hip-hop artists, and increasing sales of Famous Stars and Straps, whose clothing was frequently featured on screen. But its production placed additional strain on Barker and Moakler's marriage. Moakler later expressed mixed feelings about the experience, appreciating the footage documenting their early relationship while believing that the show ultimately contributed to its deterioration. Moakler's frequent appearances resting in bed also became a recurring subject of commentary among viewers, a portrayal she later disputed, explaining that she was often exhausted from caring for three young children.

The series ended in 2006 after two seasons. Moakler suggested that the series ended because Barker had grown concerned about being perceived as a TV personality rather than a serious musician. In a 2006 interview with the Associated Press, he described the experience positively but suggested that additional seasons would become excessive. "There comes a time when you're like 'I'm done sharing,'" he explained, adding that two seasons had provided audiences with a sufficient glimpse into his family life and personality.

== Family members ==
- Travis Barker (born November 14, 1975) is the drummer of Blink-182 and The Transplants, and (formerly of) The Aquabats, Box Car Racer, and +44.
- Shanna Moakler (born March 28, 1975) is a former Miss New York USA, Miss USA (received crown when the winner Chelsi Smith became Miss Universe), and Playboy model. She played "Monica Harper" on the television series Pacific Blue from 1998 though 2000.
- Atiana Cecilia De La Hoya (born March 29, 1999) is the daughter of Moakler and boxer Oscar De La Hoya.
- Landon Barker (born October 9, 2003) is Barker and Moakler's son and older child.
- Alabama Barker is Barker and Moakler's daughter and younger child. She was born during the production of season two and only shown in the final episode.

== Episode guide ==
=== Season 1 ===
Ep #	Title	Airdate
1	"It's Moving Day for the Barkers!"	April 6, 2005
2	"Mr. Mom"	April 13, 2005
3	"The Juicy Black Dress"	April 13, 2005
4	"Wedding Issues"	April 27, 2005
5	"Barkers' Bachelor Party"	May 4, 2005
6	"Travis' Birthday Bash"	May 11, 2005
7	"Thanksgiving!"	May 18, 2005
8	"On the Road Again"	May 25, 2005
9	"Christmas"	June 1, 2005
10	"Barkers Head to Hawaii"	June 8, 2005

=== Season 2 ===
Ep #	Title	Airdate
11	"The Barkers are Back!"	January 3, 2006
12	"Happy Birthday Travis"	January 10, 2006
13	"Gettin' to Work"	January 17, 2006
14	"The $10,000 Christmas Tree"	January 24, 2006
15	"Home Furnishing Disaster"	January 31, 2006
16	"An Alabama Christmas"	February 7, 2006
