= House of Dilip Kumar =

Building in Peshawar, Pakistan

House of Dilip Kumar, Peshawar
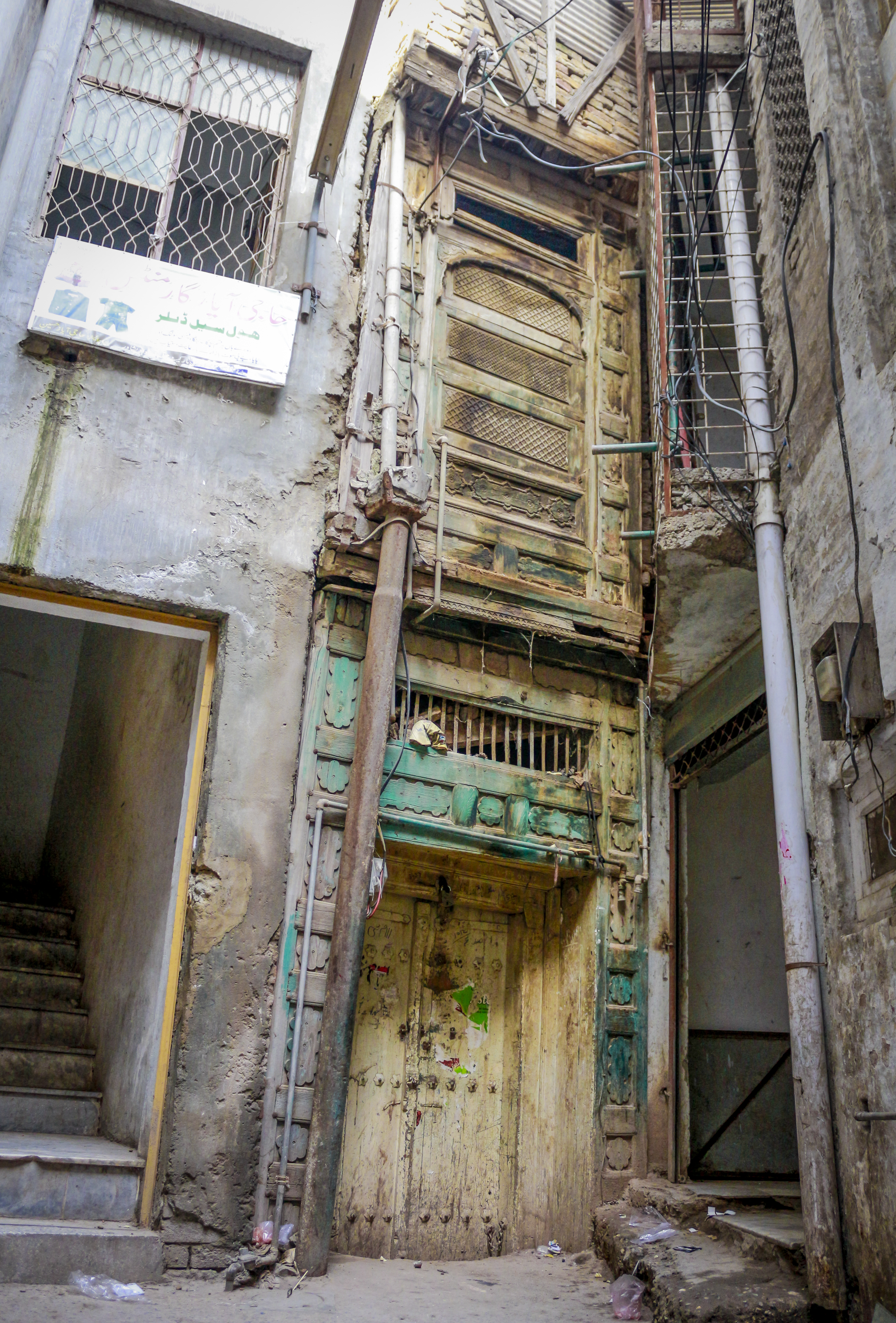
- Dilip Kumar's house
- Interactive map of House of Dilip Kumar, Peshawar
- Location: Peshawar, Khyber Pakhtunkhwa, Pakistan
- Coordinates: 34.00729°N 71.57177°E

The House of Dilip Kumar, in Peshawar housed the Indian film actor Dilip Kumar. Born as Mohammad Yusuf Khan in Peshawar (North West Frontier Province, British India) on 11 December 1922, he was one of twelve siblings and moved to Bombay in the late 1930s with his family.

The building was named as a Pakistani national heritage monument on 13 July 2014 by Prime Minister Nawaz Sharif.

Kumar once visited his house and sentimentally kissed the soil. In 1988, during a visit to Peshawar, he gave an interview at the PC Hotel in which he fondly recalled the days of his childhood and growing up, lapsing into Hindko and Pashto from time to time.

In 1997, when he was awarded Nishan-e-Imtiaz, Pakistan's highest civilian honor, he was unable to reach the house because of uncontrollable crowds. Meanwhile, the government had been trying to acquire the house.

== Location ==
The house is located in the Qissa Khawani Bazaar of Peshawar, Khyber Pakhtunkhwa, Pakistan.

== Acquisition ==
On 13 July 2013, Nawaz Sharif directed the Ministry of Information, Broadcasting and National Heritage to acquire the house. The order was forwarded to the Director General of Pakistan National Council of Arts (PNCA) for implementation. According to media sources, the move was intended to promote the cultural India-Pakistan relations.

== Conversion to museum ==
The Pakistani government planned to convert the site into a museum after acquisition. Planning was also being made to invite Dilip Kumar and other members of his family.

On 26 July 2014, the house was declared a "protected monument" under the Antiquity Act of 1997.

== Dilip Kumar and the Kapoor family ==
Both growing up in Peshawar and in Bombay, Dilip Kumar and his family had close friendly relationship with the Kapoors. In his autobiography, The Substance and The Shadow, Kumar writes: "We were living in undivided India at the time and there was a sizeable Hindu population. Men as well as women mingled freely with Muslims in the market square, wishing each other and exchanging pleasantries ever so cheerfully. Aghaji (my father), had many Hindu friends, and one of them was Basheshwarnathji, who held an important job in the civil services. His elder son came to our house with him a few times and he stunned the ladies with his handsome appearances. That was Raj Kapoor's father Prithviraj Kapoor."

== See also ==
- Chunnamal Haveli
- Ghalib ki Haveli
- Haveli of Nau Nihal Singh
- Kapoor Haveli, ancestral house of the Kapoor family of Bollywood in Peshawar, also in same locality
- Shekhawati
