= Kapuram =

Kapuram (transl. Married Life in Telugu) may refer to these Indian films:

- Chelleli Kapuram, a 1971 Telugu film directed by K. Viswanath
- Kodalu Diddina Kapuram, a 1970 Telugu film directed by D. Yoganand
- Pandanti Kapuram, a 1972 Telugu film

== See also ==
- Kapur (disambiguation)
- Married Life (disambiguation)
