= Married Life =

Married Life may refer to:

- Married Life (TV series)
- Married Life (1920 film), an American comedy film starring Ben Turpin
- Married Life (1921 film), a British drama film directed by Georges Tréville
- Married Love (film), a 1923 British drama film directed by Alexander Butler, also known as Married Life
- Married Life (2007 film), an American drama period film directed by Ira Sachs
- Married Life (novel), a novel written in Hebrew between 1927 and 1928 by Jewish novelist and poet David Vogel
- "Married Life", an instrumental from the opening sequence of the 2009 movie Up, composed by Michael Giacchino

== See also ==
- Kapuram (disambiguation)
