= Khunsapur =

Village in Jaunpur, Uttar Pradesh, India

Coordinates: 25°48′N 82°29′E

Khunsapur is a village in Jaunpur, Uttar Pradesh, India.
