= Married Life (novel) =

1988 book by David Vogel

- 1986 Hebrew edition
- Author: David Vogel
- Language: English (trans from Hebrew)
- Genre: Fiction
- Publisher: Peter Halban Publishers
- Publication date: 1986
- Media type: Print (Paperback)
- Pages: 500 pp
- ISBN: 9-781870-015707

Married Life (in Hebrew: Hayey Nisu'im חיי נישואים) is a novel written in Hebrew between 1927-1928 by Jewish novelist and poet David Vogel. The novel was first published in three sections between 1929–1931, and later on in a new edition in 1986.

== Plot summary ==
Set in Vienna in the 1920s, Married Life is an urban novel, in which that city had witnessed defeat in the First World War and the collapse of the Habsburg Empire, and plays a central role as the setting it is based in.

The social decay and presentiments of an ominous future mirror the pathological relationship between Rudolf Gurdweill, a poor Jewish intellectual and Dorothea "Thea" von Takow, an Austrian baroness who takes pleasure in humiliating him at every turn. The relationship is portrayed in telling detail as the couple descends till nightmarish depths of cruelty and masochism, eventually ending in Thea's sexual betrayal of Gurdweill and her murder at his own hands.
