= Kumaranallur, Kozhikode =

Kumaranallur
- village
- Location in Kerala, India Kumaranallur (India)
- Coordinates: 9°37′N 76°35′E
- Country: India
- State: Kerala
- District: Kozhikode

Population (2011)
  - Total: 18,105

Languages
  - Official: Malayalam, English
- Time zone: UTC+5:30 (IST)
- Vehicle registration: KL-

Kumaranallur is a village in Kottayam district in the state of Kerala, India.

== Demographics ==
As of 2011 India census, Kumaranallur had a population of 18105 with 8531 males and 9574 females.
