= Westfort Hospital =

Hospital in Thrissur, India

Coordinates: 10°32′13″N 76°11′49″E

The Westfort Hospital is a 250-bed hospital in Thrissur, Kerala, India. The hospital was founded in 1989. It was the first private hospital in Thrissur to establish a Trauma Unit with neurology and neurosurgical facilities, a spiral C.T. Scan Unit, a nephrology unit, a nuclear medicine department and a bone densitometer in orthopaedics. Hospital services include renal transplantation. The hospital is located near to the Thrissur and Punkunnam railway stations, the Kerala State Road Transport Corporation, and the private bus stand.
