= Kapoorgarh =

Coordinates: 30.5649769°N 76.1158133°E

Kapoorgarh, also spelt as Kapurgarh, is a village in Amloh Tehsil in the Fatehgarh Sahib district of Punjab, India. It has a current total population of about 1800, with voter registries recording 1163 voters, 618 females and 545 males. About half of the population (900+) people are considered part of Scheduled Castes (SC). According to government figures, there are about 300 families in Kapoorgarh.

== History ==
The village of Kapurgarh in Nabha was named after Nawab Kapur Singh.

This village is notable for the Gurudwara of Sahib Baba Natha Singh Ji, and an old temple containing the antique relics of the Tenth Guru Gobind Singh Ji. There are also two handwritten copies of the Guru Granth Sahib, one called Dasam Granth.

== Gallery ==
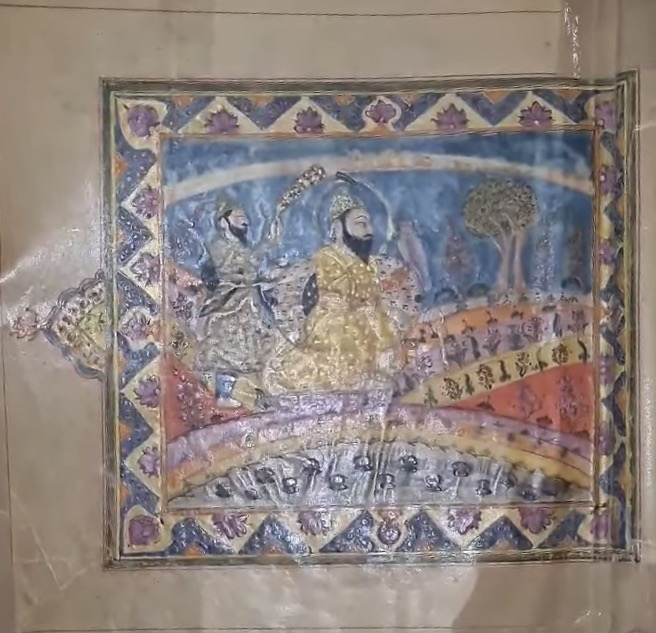
Painting of Guru Gobind Singh, from within an illustrated Dasam Granth manuscript kept at the local gurdwara of Kapurgarh associated with Baba Natha Singh

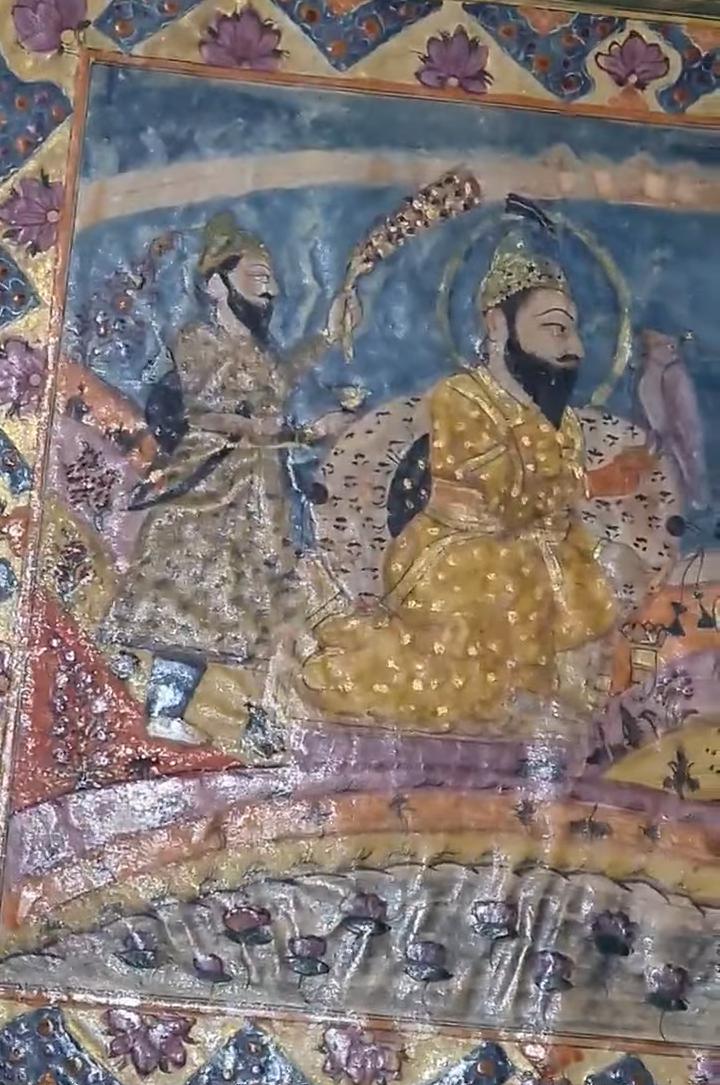
Painting of Guru Gobind Singh, from within an illustrated Dasam Granth manuscript kept at the local gurdwara of Kapurgarh associated with Baba Natha Singh
