= Anil Vallathol =

Indian writer and academic

- Born: V. Anil Kumar; June 1, 1964 (age 62)
- Occupations: Writer, academic
- Spouse: Sushama
- Children: 2

V. Anil Kumar (born 1 June 1964) popularly known as Anil Vallathol is a Malayalam language writer and academic from Kerala, India. Anil hails from the family of the poet Vallathol Narayana Menon.

== Biography ==
Anil Vallathol is the son of the Vallathol Shanthakumari and Chandrasekharan Nair. After completing his primary education at Vallathol School, he done his higher studies from Thiroorangady PSMO and Kozhikode Govt Arts and Science College.

After passing master's degree with first rank from the University of Calicut in 1986, he became a Malayalam lecturer at Taliparamba Sir Syed College in 1987 and at Kalady Sanskrit University in 1995. He has been a lecturer at Calicut University since 2006 and became a professor in 2007. Under the guidance of Prof. Chathanath Achuthanunni he done his Ph.D. in Vallathol poems From the University of Calicut. He became the Vice Chancellor of the Malayalam University in 2018.

He has been a member of the Malayalam Language Advisory Committee of the Sahitya Akademi. He is a member of the Board of Studies of various Universities in India. He has published about fifteen books and seventy research papers. During the period from 2012 to 2017, he won a scholarship of 41 lakh in Literary Historiography in Malayalam under the leadership of UGC. Anil Vallathol's books have been included in the graduate syllabus of Calicut and MG Universities. He is associated with progressive movements and is in charge of several cultural institutions.

== Family ==
His wife Sushma is a teacher. His elder son Manjunath is a Dermatologist and his second son Niranjan is a MEd student.

== Literary contributions ==
- Kuttippurathu kesavan nair (Biography). Kerala Sahitya Akademi. 2012. ISBN 9788176902014.
- Vallathol, Anil, ed. (2007). Malayalavimarsam - 19: veenapoove padanangal (Malayalam Poetry Criticism). University of Calicut.
- Manipraval kavyamalika (Malayalam Poetry Study). The State Institute of Languages. 2013. ISBN 9788176385299.
- Vallatholinte Sanchara Pathangal (in Malayalam). Kerala Bhasha Institute. 2019. ISBN 9788193745847.
- Kavyabhasha Padanangal (Poetry Study) (in Malayalam). Lipi Publications. 2004.
- Vallathol Prathbha (Poetry Study) (in Malayalam). Vallathol Vidyapeedam. 2004.
- Vallatholinte Kavyasailli (Poetry Study) (in Malayalam). Vallathol Vidyapeedam. 1997.
- T. N. Gopinathan Nair (biography). University of Kerala Department of Publications. 2016. ISBN 978-81-932971-4-8. OCLC 1080249561.
- Acyutanunni, Chathanath; Vallathol, Anil (2011). Basheerum Samakalika Malayala Sahithyavum. University of Calicut, Vaikom Muhammed Basheer Chair. OCLC 904715908.

== Awards and honors ==
He received the Kerala Kalamandalam Award for Best Documentary, Moorkoth Kumaran Endowment Award, Sreemad Bhagavad Tatwa Sameeksha Award, P.K. Smaraka Trust Award, Pillaras of Secularism Award by MES group, Korot Lakshmikutty Amma Puraskaram and Chanakya Award. His work Ezhuthachan Enna Padapusthakam received the 2019 Abu Dhabi Sakthi Award in scholarly literature category.
