= Kapoor Haveli =

Ancestral residedency of Kapoor family

Coordinates: 34.0091°N 71.5716°E

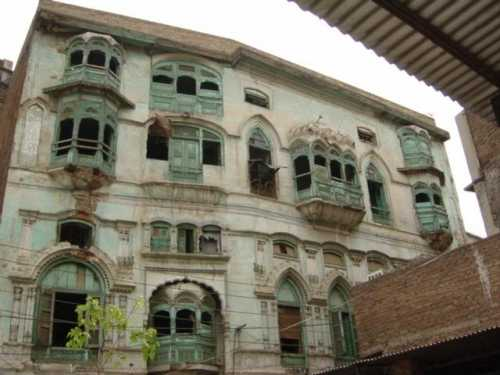
- Kapoor Haveli in Peshawar
- Interactive map of the Kapoor Haveli area

General information
- Location: Peshawar, Khyber Pakhtunkhwa, Pakistan

Other information
- Number of rooms: About 40

Kapoor Haveli is a residential building in the city of Peshawar, Pakistan.

It is notable for being the former home of one generation of the Kapoor family, a prominent show business family of India. The building was constructed before the partition of India, between 1918 and 1922, by Dewan Basheswarnath Kapoor, father of Prithviraj Kapoor, the first member of the family to enter the film industry in 1928, as an extra in his first film, Be Dhari Talwar. Among the notable members of the family, Trilok Kapoor, Prithiviraj's younger brother and his son, Raj Kapoor were born in the building.

The Kapoors are Punjabi Hindus. After the Partition in 1947, members of the family, like other Hindus, left the city and the building. It was purchased in an auction in 1968 by a local individual from Charsadda town in the North West Frontier Province under the settlement clause and then sold to a resident of Peshawar.

It is now being converted into a museum by IMGC Global Entertainment in Pakistan with the support of Khyber Pakhtunkhwa government. In 2021, the Deputy Commissioner of Peshawar valued the house at Rs 15 million. Khyber Pakhtunkhwa's archaeology department plans to turn the houses into a museum. The deputy commissioner sent the notices to the current owners. The current owner, Haji Hassan Qadir, is asking for Rs 2 billion.

== History ==
According to a wooden slab inside the entrance, the construction of the building was started in 1918 and completed in 1922 in British India.

The Kapoors are Punjabi Hindus. Raj Kapoor was born in this haveli in 1924. Two of his younger siblings, who died early in 1931, were also born here. Shammi Kapoor and Shashi Kapoor were born in India, but they visited and lived at the mansion at times. After the Partition of India in 1947, members of the family, like other Hindus, left the city and the building. It was purchased in an auction in 1968 by a jeweller Haji Khushal Rasool from Charsadda town in the North West Frontier Province under the settlement clause and then sold to a resident of Peshawar.

Haji Israr Shah, the current owner of the building, said his father had purchased the building in the mid-1980s. Area residents say they used the building for events like marriage celebrations. Local resident and former mayor Abdul Hakim Safi said "The house has been empty for about 12 years as its present owners visit rarely".

The owners of the historic building demolished its top three storeys two decades ago due to cracks created by an earthquake in its upper portion due to its location on steep mound. The building today is surrounded by commercial buildings, posing serious threat to its body.

Raj Kapoor's younger brother Shashi Kapoor, and sons, Randhir Kapoor and Rishi Kapoor, visited Peshawar and their old family home in 1990. They also took some soil from the compound to remember their heritage.

In April 3, 2026, an earthquake as well as heavy rains caused a part of the Kapoor Haveli to partially collapse. No casualties were reported however, as a result of the incident.

== Architecture ==
The multi-storey house has about 40 rooms and its front is adorned with exquisite floral motifs and 'jharokas' or overhanging balconies. Many sections of the facade have begun crumbling.

== Memories ==
The elders of Dhaki Munawar Shah when visited by a journalist in 2003 still recalled the days they spent with the Kapoor family. Abdul Wahid, a bedridden 75-year-old shoemaker, stated "I used to play with Raj Kapoor". He remembers when he enjoyed cold drinks with Raj Kapoor from Binori Lal's shop situated near the mansion. Mohammad Yaqoob, a 90-year-old resident of Dhakki, remembers Raj Kapoor. "He was my buddy back in the 1920s. He was a year younger than me. We used to play a game of sticks called gulli-danda. We went to the same school". Kailashwati, next door neighbour in Samundari (birthplace of Prithviraj Kapoor), whom Kapoor family used to call "laal chunni" recalls how passionate Prithviraj Kapoor was about theatre.

The Kapoors moved to Mumbai in the 1930s, and their occasional visits to Peshawar ended completely after the partition of India in 1947, he says. Some of the family friends of the Kapoor family have visited the Kapoors.

== See also ==
- Haveli of Nau Nihal Singh
- House of Dilip Kumar, Peshawar
