= Kappur (Palakkad district) =

Gram Panchayat in Palakkad district of Kerala, India

Kappur is a village and gram panchayat in Palakkad district, Kerala, India.

== Demographics ==
As of 2001 India census, Kappur had a population of 28,349 with 11,532 males and 14,817 females.
