= Tirur Taluk =

- Taluk
- Location in Malappuram district, Kerala, India
- Coordinates: 11.152610°N 75.956678°E
- Country: India
- State: Kerala
- District: Malappuram
- Taluk formation: 1 November 1957; 68 years ago
- Founder: Government of Kerala
- Headquarters: Tirur

Languages
  - Official: Malayalam, English
- Time zone: UTC+5:30 (IST)
- Vehicle registration: KL-55

Tirur Taluk comes under Tirur revenue division in Malappuram district in the Indian state of Kerala. Its headquarters is the town of Tirur. Tirur Taluk contains four municipalities - Tanur, Tirur, Kottakkal, and Valanchery. Most of the administrative offices are located in the Mini-Civil Stations at Tirur, Kuttippuram, and Tanur. Most of the villages in present-day Tirur Taluk were parts of the medieval Kingdom of Tanur (Vettathunadu). The port of Tanur was an important port town in the southwestern coast of India during medieval period.

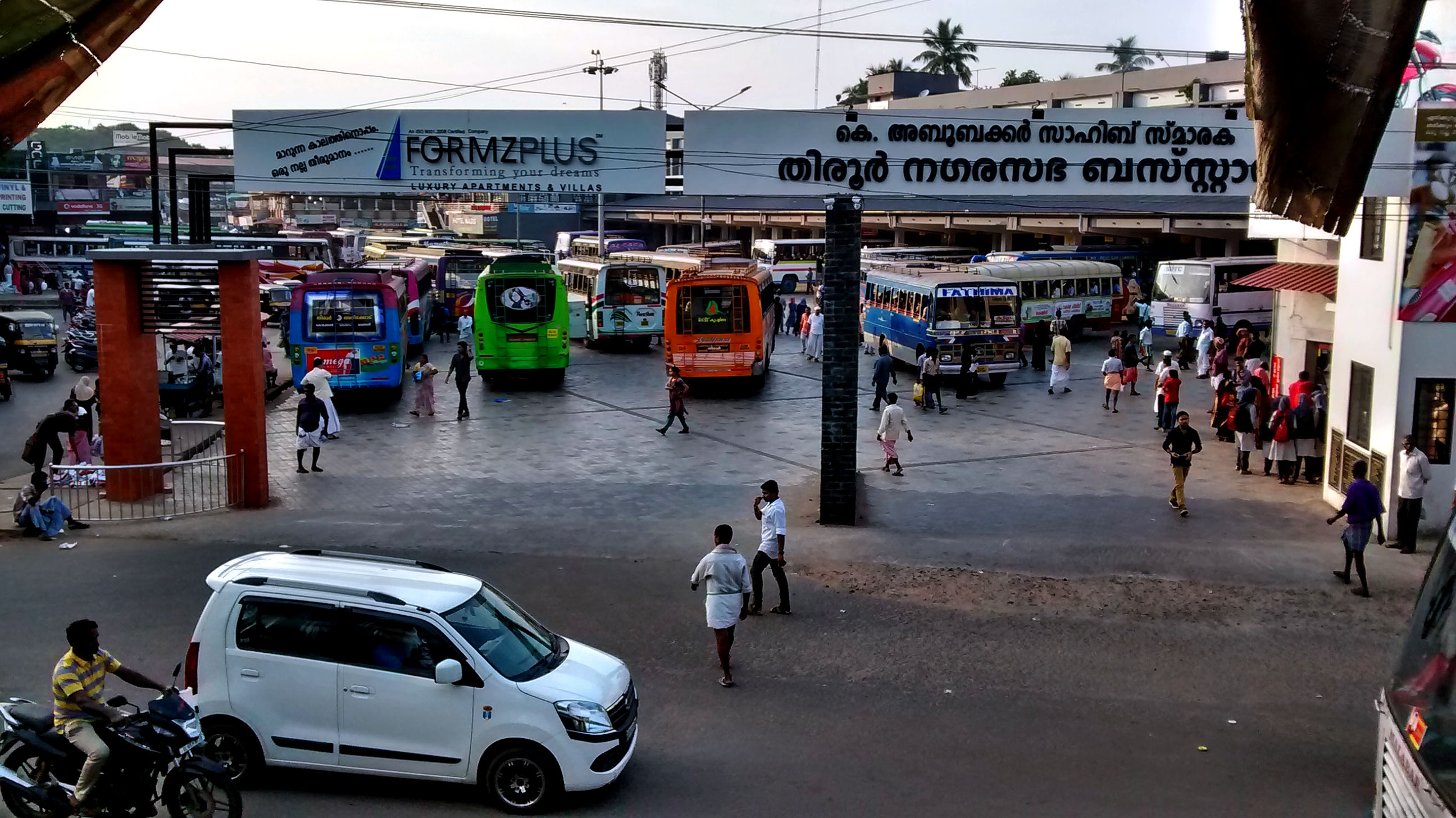
Tirur

== History ==
Tirur Taluk was formed on 1 November 1957 by carving 43 villages out of the Old Ponnani taluk and 30 villages out of the Old Eranad Taluk. Tirur, Tanur, and Kuttippuram Revenue blocks were taken from the Old Ponnani taluk while the Revenue blocks of Tirurangadi and Vengara were taken out of the Old Eranad Taluk. At that time, Tirur Taluk was the largest coastal Taluk in Kerala which had contained the entire coastal belt wedged between Beypore port and Ponnani port (having nearly 65 km seacoast). Later on 16 June 1969, three villages, namely Feroke, Ramanattukara, and Kadalundi, were transferred from Tirur Taluk to Kozhikode Taluk, and Parudur village from Kuttippuram block was transferred to the Ottapalam Taluk. Later in the 1990s, the Revenue blocks of Tirurangadi and Vengara were separated from Tirur Taluk to form Tirurangadi Taluk, and the revenue villages of Kottakkal and Ponmala were added newly to Tirur Taluk from Eranad Taluk.

Currently, Tirur Taluk, having 30 villages, is the most populous Taluk of Malappuram District.

== Villages ==
Tirur taluk contains the following 30 villages.

1. Ananthavoor
2. Athavanad
3. Cheriyamundam
4. Edayur
5. Irimbiliyam
6. Kalpakanchery
7. Kattiparuthy
8. Kottakkal
9. Kurumbathur
10. Kuttippuram
11. Mangalam
12. Marakkara
13. Melmuri
14. Naduvattom
15. Niramaruthur
16. Ozhur
17. Pariyapuram
18. Perumanna
19. Ponmala
20. Ponmundam
21. Purathur
22. Tanalur
23. Tanur
24. Thalakkad
25. Tirunavaya
26. Tirur
27. Trikkandiyur
28. Triprangode
29. Valavannur
30. Vettom

== Notable people from Tirur Taluk ==
=== Tirur region ===
- Abdurahiman Randathani - politician and former MLA.
- Achyutha Pisharadi - a Sanskrit grammarian, astronomer and mathematician.
- vijayan (actor) - actor
- Hemanth Menon - actor
- Adil Ibrahim - actor.
- Azad Moopen - doctor.
- B. M. Kutty - journalist.
- C. Radhakrishnan - writer and film director.
- Damodara Nambudiri - mathematician.
- Dileep K. Nair - Educationist.
- Govinda Bhattathiri - mathematician.
- K. V. Ramakrishnan, poet.
- Kalamandalam Kalyanikutty Amma - Resurrector of Mohiniyattam.
- Kurukkoli Moideen, Politician and MLA.
- Kuttikrishna Marar - literary critic.
- Malayath Appunni - poet and children's writer.
- Melpathur Narayana Bhattathiri - mathematician and Sanskrit poet.
- Mohammed Irshad - Footballer.
- Mohamed Salah - footballer.
- N. Samsudheen - Politician and MLA.
- P. Nandakumar - Politician and MLA.
- Parameshvara Nambudiri - mathematician.
- Pulapre Balakrishnan - Economist and Educationalist.
- Ranjith Padinhateeri - biological physicist,
- Ravi Vallathol - actor.
- Salman Kalliyath - Footballer.
- T. M. Nair - Political activist.
- Thunchaththu Ezhuthachan - Father of Malayalam language.
- Tirur Nambissan - Kathakali singer.
- V. Abdurahiman - Minister of Kerala.
- Vaidyaratnam Triprangode Moossad - Ayurvedic physician.
- Vallathol Narayana Menon - One of the triumvirate poets of Malayalam and the founder of Kerala Kalamandalam.

=== Kottakkal region ===
- Vaidyaratnam P. S. Warrier (founder of Kottakkal Arya Vaidya Sala)
- K C Manorama Thampuratti (eminent Sanskrit poet)
- K. C. Manavedan Raja (founder of Raja's High School, Zamorin of Calicut during 1932-1937)
- M. K. Vellodi (Indian civil servant, diplomat, former Cabinet Secretary)
- Dr. K. C. K. E Raja, former Vice Chancellor Kerala University and Director General of Health Services.
- Sangita Madhavan Nair, Actress
- U. A. Beeran
- Jayasree Kalathil, Researcher
- P. K. Warrier (ayurveda practitioner)
- Kottakkal Sivaraman (eminent Kathakali artist)
- V. C. Balakrishna Panicker
- Kottakkal Madhu (Kathakali singer)
- M. P. Abdussamad Samadani (politician, MLA, former Member of Parliament)
- Sachin Warrier (playback singer and composer)

=== Valanchery region ===
- Azhvanchery Thamprakkal - Former chief of Nambudiris of Kerala.
- K T Jaleel, politician and former minister.
- Zakariya Mohammed, director, scriptwriter and actor.
- Unni Menon, playback singer.
- Shweta Menon, actress.
- Aneesh G. Menon, actor.
- Edasseri Govindan Nair, poet.
- K. V. Ramakrishnan, poet.
- Iqbal Kuttippuram, Screenwriter.
- Kuttippuram Kesavan Nair, poet.
- M. T. Vasudevan Nair, poet.
- V. P. Sanu, politician.
- Ahmad Kutty, North American Islamic scholar.
- Faisal Kutty, Lawyer, law professor, public speaker, orator.

== Geographical indication ==
Tirur Betel Leaf was awarded the Geographical Indication (GI) status tag from the Geographical Indications Registry, under the Union Government of India, on 14 August 2019.

Tirur Vettila Ulpadaka Sangam from Tirur, proposed the GI registration of 'Tirur Betel Leaf (Tirur Vettila)'. After filing the application in December 2018, the Betel leaf was granted the GI tag in 2019 by the Geographical Indication Registry in Chennai, making the name "Tirur Betel Leaf (Tirur Vettila)" exclusive to the Betel leaf cultivated in the region. It thus became the first Betel leaf variety from Kerala and the 36th type of goods from Kerala to earn the GI tag.

The prestigious GI tag, awarded by the GI registry, certifies that a product possesses distinct qualities, adheres to traditional production methods, and has earned a reputation rooted in its geographical origin.

== See also ==
- List of villages in Malappuram district
- List of Gram Panchayats in Malappuram district
- List of desoms in Malappuram district (1981)
- Revenue Divisions of Kerala
