= Kottakkal Assembly constituency =

Constituency of the Kerala legislative assembly in India

Kottakkal
- Constituency No. 46 for the Kerala Legislative Assembly
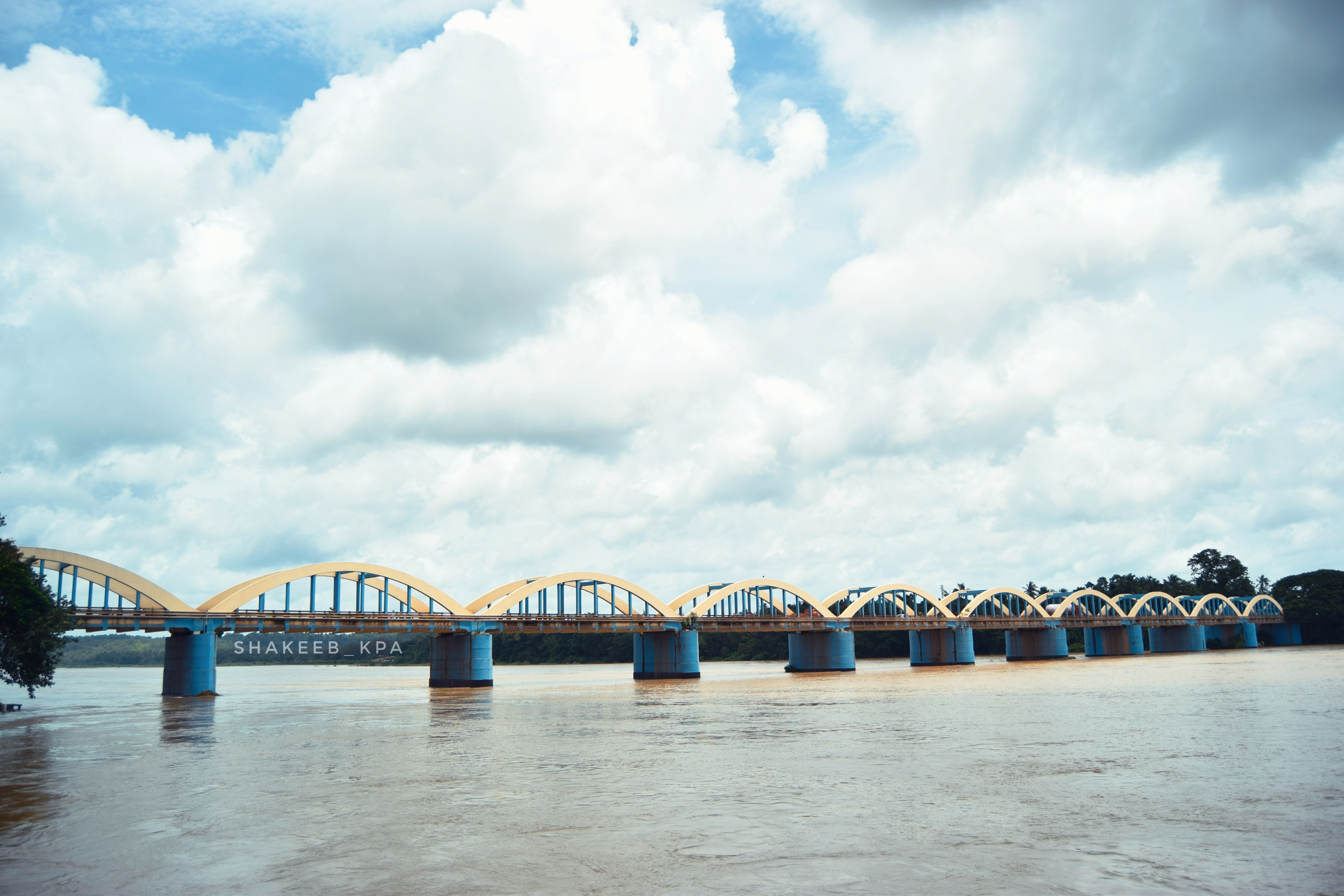
- Kuttippuram bridge over Bharathappuzha

Constituency details
- Country: India
- Region: South India
- State: Kerala
- District: Malappuram
- Established: 1951 (first establishment); 2008 (second establishment)
- Total electors: 1,98,872 (2016)
- Reservation: None

Member of Legislative Assembly
- 16th Kerala Legislative Assembly
- Incumbent K. K. Abid Hussain Thangal
- Party: IUML
- Alliance: UDF
- Elected year: 2026

Kottakkal State assembly constituency is one of the 140 state legislative assembly constituencies in Kerala in southern India. It is also one of the seven state legislative assembly constituencies included in Ponnani Lok Sabha constituency. As of the 2026 Assembly elections, the current MLA is K. K Abid Hussain Thangal of IUML.

== Local self-governed segments ==
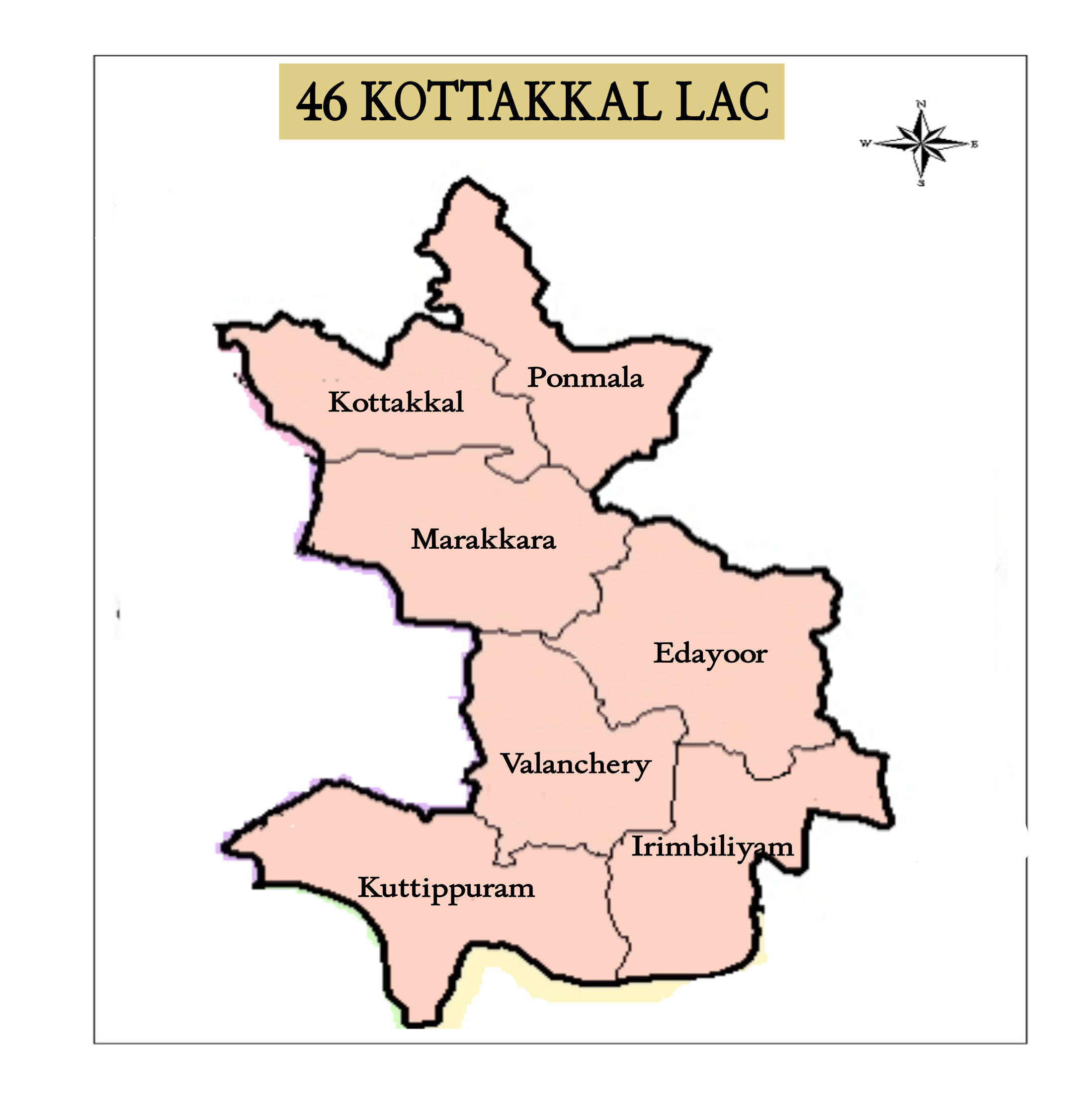
Map of Kottakkal Assembly constituency

Kottakkal Assembly constituency is composed of the following local self-governed segments:

Sl no.	Name	Status (Grama panchayat/Municipality)	Taluk
1	Kottakkal	Municipality	Tirur
2	Valanchery	Municipality	Tirur
3	Ponmala	Grama panchayat	Tirur
4	Marakkara	Grama panchayat	Tirur
5	Edayur	Grama panchayat	Tirur
6	Irimbiliyam	Grama panchayat	Tirur
7	Kuttippuram	Grama panchayat	Tirur

Kottakkal Assembly constituency

== Members of Legislative Assembly ==
The following list contains all members of Kerala Legislative Assembly who have represented Kottakkal Assembly constituency during the period of various assemblies:

Election	Niyama Sabha	Member	Party	Tenure
2011	13th	M. P. Abdussamad Samadani	IUML	2011 – 2016
2016	14th	K. K. Abid Hussain Thangal	IUML	2016 – 2021
2021	15th	K. K. Abid Hussain Thangal	IUML	2021 - 2026
2026	16th	K. K. Abid Hussain Thangal	IUML	2026 -

== Election results ==
Percentage change (±%) denotes the change in the number of votes from the immediate previous election.

=== 2026 ===
2026 Kerala Legislative Assembly election: Kottakkal
Party	Candidate	Votes	%	±%
IUML	K. K. Abid Hussain Thangal	118,111		
CPI(M)	Preethi Konchath	55,473		
BDJS	Subramanian Chungappally	10,558		
SDPI	Abdul Majeed	4,557		
NOTA	None of the above	1,293		
Independent	Preethi K. P.	674		
Independent	Mohamed Rafi	545		
Margin of victory		62,638		
Turnout		1,91,211		
IUML hold		Swing		

=== 2021 ===
There were 2,05,405 registered voters in Kottakkal Assembly constituency for the 2021 Kerala Assembly election.

2021 Kerala Legislative Assembly election: Kottakkal
Party	Candidate	Votes	%	±%
IUML	K. K. Abid Hussain Thangal	81,700	51.3%	
NCP	N. A. Mohammed Kutty	65,112	40.9%	
BJP	P. P. Ganesan	10,796	6.8%	
NOTA	None of the above	668	0.42%	
Margin of victory		16,588	10.4%	
Turnout		1,59,265	77.9%	
IUML hold		Swing		

=== 2016 ===
There were 1,98,872 registered voters in Kottakkal Assembly constituency for the 2016 Kerala Assembly election.

2016 Kerala Legislative Assembly election: Kottakkal
Party	Candidate	Votes	%	±%
IUML	K. K. Abid Hussain Thangal	71,768	48.34%	▼10.57
NCP	N. A. Mohammed Kutty	56,726	38.21%	▲9.64
BJP	V. Unnikrishnan Master	13,205	8.89%	▲2.31
PDP	Neyyathoor Kunhimohamed	2,763	1.86%	▼0.70
SDPI	K. P. O. Rahmathullah	1,719	1.16%	▼1.08
NOTA	None of the above	806	0.54%	−
Independent	C. Muhammed Kutty	579	0.39%	−
Independent	Villan Mohammed Kutty	429	0.29%	−
Margin of victory		15,042	10.13%	▼20.21
Turnout		1,48,473	74.66%	▲4.01
IUML hold		Swing	▼10.57	

=== 2011 ===
There were 1,67,498 registered voters in the constituency for the 2011 election.

2011 Kerala Legislative Assembly election: Kottakkal
Party	Candidate	Votes	%	±%
IUML	Abdusamad Samadani	69,717	58.91%	
NCP	C. P. K. Gurukkal	33,815	28.57%	
BJP	K. K. Surendran	7,782	6.58%	
PDP	Ali Kadampuzha	3,027	2.56%	
SDPI	K. C. Naser	2,644	2.24%	
Independent	Kadampuzha Bindhu Devarajan	894	0.76%	
BSP	Madathil Muhammad Ellias	458	0.39%	
Margin of victory		35,902	30.34%	
Turnout		1,18,343	70.65%	
IUML hold		Swing		

=== 1952 ===
1952 Madras Legislative Assembly election: Kottakkal
Party	Candidate	Votes	%	±%
IUML	Ahmad Kutty, Chakkeeri	14,972	41.29%	
INC	Kunjunni Nedumgadi, Ezhuthassan Kalathil	9,498	26.19%	26.19%
CPI	Koya Kunhi Naha Kizhakkinakath	9,056	24.97%	
Socialist Party (India)	Mohamed Naha Kizhakkinath	2,736	7.55%	
Margin of victory		5,474	15.10%	
Turnout		36,262	51.91%	
Registered electors		69,856		
IUML win (new seat)				

== See also ==
- Kottakkal
- Valanchery
- Kuttippuram (State Assembly constituency)
- Kuttippuram Block Panchayat
- Malappuram district
- List of constituencies of the Kerala Legislative Assembly
- 2016 Kerala Legislative Assembly election
