= Kuttippuram Assembly constituency =

Constituency of the Kerala Legislative Assembly

Coordinates: 10.85°N 76.03°E

Kuttippuram
- Former constituency for the Kerala Legislative Assembly
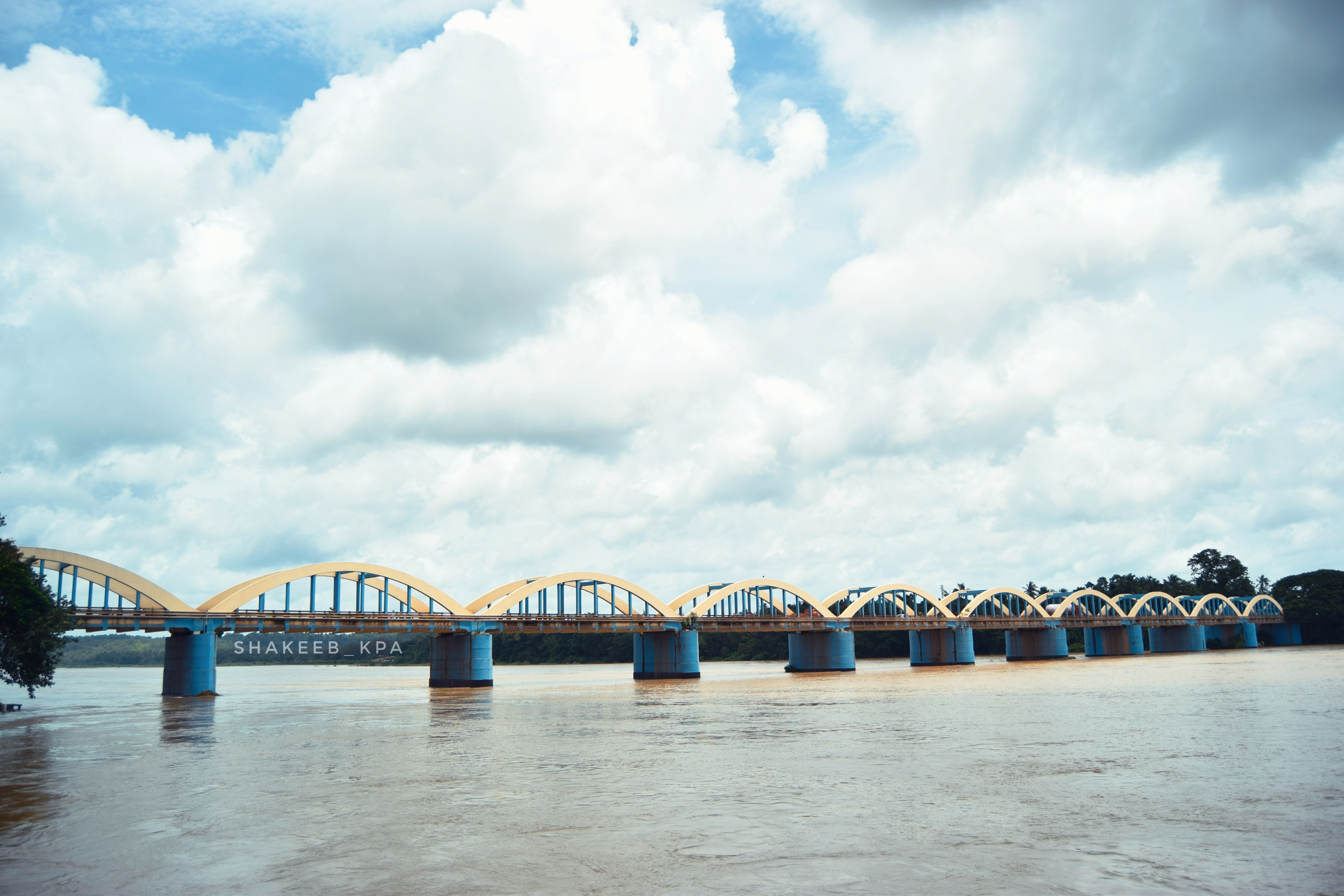
- Kuttippuram bridge over the Bharathappuzha

Constituency details
- Country: India
- Region: South India
- State: Kerala
- District: Malappuram
- Established: 1957
- Abolished: 2008
- Total electors: 1,58,951 (2006)
- Reservation: None

Kuttippuram State assembly constituency was one of the 140 state legislative assembly constituencies in Kerala in southern India, before the 2008 delimitation of constituencies. It was one of the seven state legislative assembly constituencies included in Ponnani Lok Sabha constituency until the 2008 delimitation. The last election to the constituency was conducted in 2006, and the MLA was K. T. Jaleel of LDF.

After the delimitation in 2008, Kuttippuram, Valanchery, and Marakkara Gram Panchayats became a part of the newly formed Kottakkal Assembly constituency, whereas Cheriyamundam was added to Tanur Assembly constituency. The remaining four Gram Panchayats became part of Tirur Assembly constituency.

== Local self-governed segments ==
Kuttippuram Assembly constituency was composed of the following local self-governed segments:

Sl no.	Name	Status (Grama panchayat/Municipality)	Taluk	Now part of
1	Tirunavaya	Grama panchayat	Tirur	Tirur constituency
2	Athavanad	Grama panchayat	Tirur	Tirur constituency
3	Kuttippuram	Grama Panchayat	Tirur	Kottakkal constituency
4	Valanchery	Grama panchayat (Now municipality)	Tirur	Kottakkal constituency
5	Marakkara	Grama panchayat	Tirur	Kottakkal constituency
6	Kalpakanchery	Grama panchayat	Tirur	Tirur constituency
7	Valavannur	Grama panchayat	Tirur	Tirur constituency
8	Cheriyamundam	Grama panchayat	Tirur	Tanur constituency

== Election history ==
Election	Votes polled	Winner				Runner-up 1				Runner-up 2				Margin of victory	
Year		Name	Party	Votes		Name	Party	Votes		Name	Party	Votes		Votes	Percent
Constituency defunct as a result of delimitation (2011)
2006	128598 (80.9%)	K. T. Jaleel	LDF Independent	64207	49.93%	P. K. Kunhalikutty	IUML	55426	43.10%	Anilkumar	BJP	4862	3.78%	8781	6.83%
2001	80909 (61.2%)	P. K. Kunhalikutty	IUML	50201	62.05%	Kolakkattil Ibrahimkutty	RSP	24096	29.78%	V. N. Ramachandran Master	BJP	5045	6.24%	26105	32.27%
1996	82627 (61.1%)	P. K. Kunhalikutty	IUML	46943	59.58%	Ibrahim Haji Mayyeri	INL	22247	28.23%	Pushparajan Athavanad	BJP	5018	6.37%	24696	31.35%
1991	74330 (56.9%)	P. K. Kunhalikutty	IUML	44865	61.65%	V. P. Zakariya	CPI(M)	22539	30.97%	C. Karunakaran	BJP	4611	6.34%	22326	30.68%
1987	71468 (69.3%)	Korambayil Ahamed Haji	IUML	45654	64.73%	Choorappilakkal Alavikutty	CPI(M)	15087	21.39%	Koduvarathodi Kesavan Nair	BJP	6579	9.33%	30567	43.34%
1982	48074 (59.3%)	Korambayil Ahamed Haji	IUML	31521	66.44%	T. K. Ahamed	ML(O)	13263	27.96%	K. T. Kesavan Nair	BJP	2236	4.71%	18258	38.48%
1980	49980 (57.9%)	Korambayil Ahamed Haji	IUML	33863	68.32%	P. V. S. Musthafa Pookoya Thangal	ML(O)	15703	31.68%	Only two candidates contested				18160	36.64%
1977	49741 (67.0%)	Chakkeeri Ahamed Kutty	IUML	36367	56.18%	K. Moidu	ML(O)	12023	24.85%	Only two candidates contested				24344	31.33%
Major delimitation of constituency
1970	55048 (72.0%)	Chakkeeri Ahamed Kutty	IUML	30081	55.76%	M. Habeeburahman	Ind.	23870	44.24%	Only two candidates contested				6211	11.52%
1967	40769 (63.8%)	C. M. Kutty	IUML	28245	72.03%	P. R. Menon	INC	10968	27.97%	Only two candidates contested				17277	44.06%
1965	38801 (59.8%)	Mohsin Bin Ahmed	IUML	17878	47.06%	T. R. Kunhikrishnan	CPI(M)	12402	32.64%	A. Muhammad Koya	INC	7713	20.30%	5476	14.42%
Major delimitation of constituency
1960	42942 (71.9%)	K. M. Seethi Sahib	IUML	29073	70.05%	Kunhikrishnan Thorakkad	CPI	12430	29.95%	Only two candidates contested				16643	40.10%
1957	31949 (52.1%)	C. Ahmedkutty	IUML Independent	15495	48.50%	P. K. Moideenkutty	INC	10424	32.63%	T. Raghavanunni Nair	Ind.	6030	18.87%	5071	15.87%

== Election results ==
Percentage change (±%) denotes the change in the number of votes from the immediate previous election.

=== 2006 ===
There were 1,58,951 registered voters in Kuttippuram Constituency for the 2006 Kerala Niyamasabha Election.

2006 Kerala Legislative Assembly election: Kuttippuram
Party	Candidate	Votes	%	±%
LDF	K. T. Jaleel	64,207	49.93%	▲49.93
IUML	P. K. Kunhalikutty	55,426	43.10%	▼18.95
BJP	Anilkumar	4,862	3.78%	▼2.46
Independent	Kunhalikutty. K. P	1,146	0.89%	N/A
Independent	K. A. Jaleel	1,017	0.79%	N/A
Independent	Abu Nedumba	880	0.68%	N/A
Independent	Abdul Jabbar	406	0.32%	N/A
BSP	Suresh	377	0.29%	N/A
Independent	K. P. A. Jaleel	277	0.22%	N/A
Margin of victory		8,781	6.83%	N/A
Turnout		1,28,598	80.90%	▲19.70
LDF gain from IUML		Swing	N/A	

=== 2001 ===
There were 1,32,209 registered voters in Kuttippuram Constituency for the 2001 Kerala Niyamasabha Election.

2001 Kerala Legislative Assembly election: Kuttippuram
Party	Candidate	Votes	%	±%
IUML	P. K. Kunhalikutty	50,201	62.05%	▲2.47
RSP	Kolakkattil Ibrahimkutty	24,096	29.78%	▲29.78
BJP	V. N. Ramachandran Master	5,045	6.24%	▼0.13
Independent	K. P. Sayyed Ali	1,560	1.93%	N/A
Margin of victory		26,105	32.27%	▲0.92
Turnout		80,909	61.20%	
IUML hold		Swing	▲0.92	

== See also ==
- Kuttippuram
- Kuttippuram Block Panchayat
- Malappuram district
- List of constituencies of the Kerala Legislative Assembly
- 2006 Kerala Legislative Assembly election
