= Kuttippuram (disambiguation) =

Kuttippuram is a town in Kerala, India. It may also refer to:

- Kuttippuram Block Panchayat, a Block Panchayat in Kerala
- Kuttippuram (State Assembly constituency), a defunct constituency in Kerala
- Kuttippuram railway station, a Railway Station in Kerala
- Kuttippuram bridge, a Road Bridge in Kerala
