= Kuttippuram Block Panchayat =

Indian administrative body

- Local bodies in Malappuram district

Type
- Type: Block Panchayat of Kuttippuram
- Term limits: None

History
- Founded: 1 January 1962; 64 years ago
- Preceded by: Kuttippuram Revenue block (Firka)

Leadership
- President: Vaseema Veleri, Indian Union Muslim League since 2020
- Vice president: K. T. Azad Ali, Indian Union Muslim League since 2020

Structure
- Seats: 16 electoral wards
- Political groups: IUML: 10 seats INC: 4 seats CPI(M): 2 seats
- Length of term: 5 years

Elections
- Voting system: First-past-the-post
- Last election: 2010 - UDF Won
- Last election: 2015 - UDF Won
- Last general election: 2020 - UDF Won
- Next election: 2025

Meeting place
- Block Panchayat Office, Kuttippuram

Website
- lsgkerala.in/kuttippuramblock/

The Kuttippuram Block Panchayat is the block-level administrative body that administers the region around Kuttippuram in Malappuram district, Kerala, India. It is also one of the 15 Block Panchayats established for the proper block-level administration of Gram panchayats in the district. Established in 1962, the block's current president is Vaseema Veleri since 2020. Kuttippuram Block Panchayat lies in two assembly constituencies – Kottakkal (State Assembly constituency) and Tirur (State Assembly constituency) – both of which are part of the Ponnani parliamentary constituency. The Block is headed by a President and council, and manages 155.83 km^{2} of Kuttippuram block, with a population of about 229,468 within that area.

== History ==
As per the recommendations of Balwant Rai Mehta Committee and the Administrative Reforms Committee chaired by E. M. S. Namboodiripad, the State Government had to enact legislation to empower the Panchayats to ensure greater public participation in social development, to shape planned development at the village level, and to implement decentralization. The Kerala Panchayat Act, 1960 was framed and came into force on 1 January 1962 in the state. Under this Act, 922 Gram Panchayats were formed covering all the rural areas of the State. In these panchayats elected governing bodies came into power with effect from 1 January 1964.

Kuttippuram was the headquarters of a Revenue block (Firka) in Tirur Taluk. The erstwhile Firkas were reshaped into Block Panchayats and were provided with the duty for block-level administration of Gram panchayats. Hence Kuttippuram Block Panchayat came into existence on 1 January 1962. At the time of its formation, the block was composed of seven Gram panchayats namely Kuttippuram, Valanchery, Parudur, Irimbiliyam, Edayur, Marakkara, and Athavanad. Later on 16 June 1969, Parudur village was transferred to Palakkad district, and in 2015, Valanchery was upgraded to a Municipal town. Other jurisdictional change that occurred in 2015 was the addition of Kalpakanchery Gram Panchayat into block.

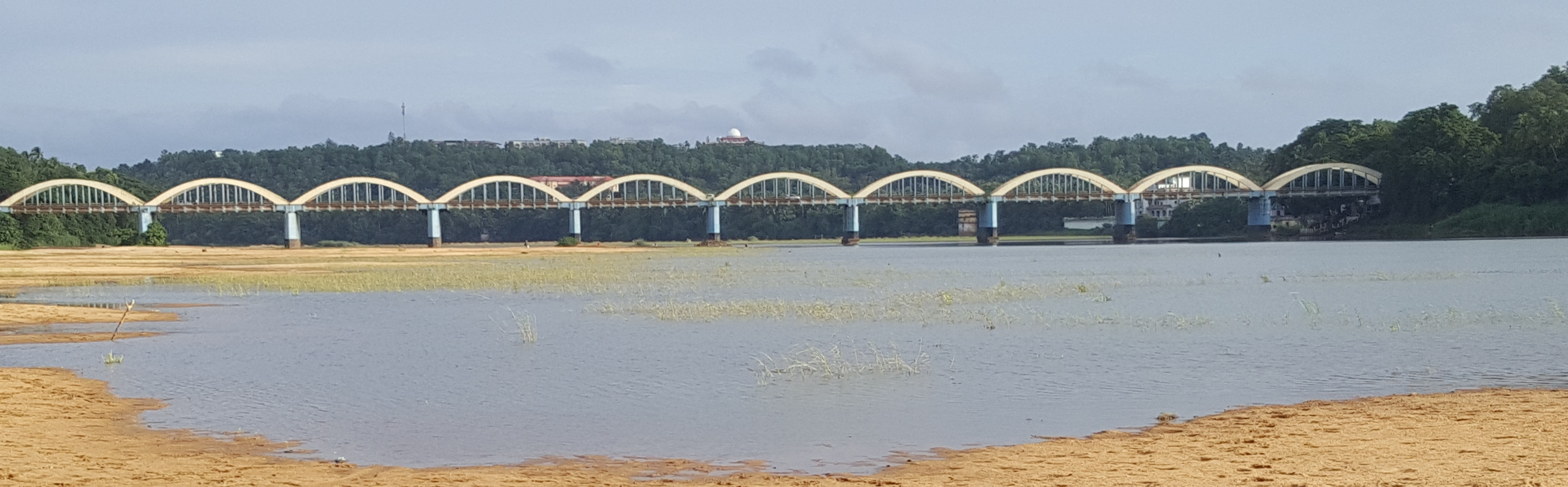
A panoramic view of Kuttippuram bridge from Nilayoram Park

== Structure ==
Kuttippuram Block Panchayat consists of the following Gram panchayats:

Sl no.	Name
1	Athavanad
2	Edayoor
3	Irimbiliyam
4	Kalpakanchery
5	Kuttippuram
6	Marakkara

Valanchery Municipality is landlocked by Kuttippuram block to all sides.

Kuttippuram Block Panchayat

== Members of the Block Council ==
Key

IUML INC CPI(M)

Members of the Block Council
Sl. No	Ward	Councillor	Party	Alliance
1	Randathani	Sabira Edathadathil	IUML	UDF
2	Chelakkuth	Manzoorali Palamadathil	INC	UDF
3	Melmuri	O. K. Zubair	IUML	UDF
4	Karekkad	P. V. Nasibudheen	IUML	UDF
5	Vadakkumpuram	Fathima Farsana. P	IUML	UDF
6	Edayoor	Bushara	CPI(M)	LDF
7	Pookkattiri	Ayisha Chittakath	IUML	UDF
8	Valiyakunnu	K. M. Muhammad Abdurahman	IUML	UDF
9	Vendallur	Abdunnoor	INC	UDF
10	Kolakkad	Vaseema Veleri	IUML	UDF
11	Kazhuthallur	Saheer Master	IUML	UDF
12	Naduvattom	Thesliya Changarath	CPI(M)	LDF
13	Athavanad	K. T. Azad Ali	IUML	UDF
14	Kurumbathur	Rimshanimol	INC	UDF
15	Puthanathani	Sreedharan K C	INC	UDF
16	Kadungathukundu	Sahira Chakkungal	IUML	UDF

== Election results ==
=== Kuttippuram Block Panchayat Election 2020 ===
Kuttippuram Block Panchayat Election 2020
S.No.	Party name	Party symbol	Number of Councillors
01	UDF		14
02	LDF		02

=== Kuttippuram Block Panchayat Election 2015 ===
Kuttippuram Block Panchayat Election 2015
S.No.	Party name	Party symbol	Number of Councillors
01	UDF		14
02	LDF		01
03	Independents		01

=== Kuttippuram Block Panchayat Election 2010 ===
Kuttippuram Block Panchayat Election 2010
S.No.	Party name	Party symbol	Number of Councillors
01	UDF		16
02	LDF		00

=== Kuttippuram Block Panchayat Election 2005 ===
Kuttippuram Block Panchayat Election 2005
S.No.	Party name	Party symbol	Number of Councillors
01	UDF		10
02	LDF		02
03	Independents		02

== See also ==
- List of Gram Panchayats in Malappuram district
- List of villages in Malappuram district
- List of desoms in Malappuram district (1981)
- Kuttippuram (State Assembly constituency)
- Tirur Taluk
- Kuttippuram
- Valanchery
- Puthanathani
- Athavanad
- Kalpakanchery
- Valiyakunnu
- Vettichira
- Edayoor
- Irimbiliyam
