= Valiyakunnu =

- Town
- Country: India
- State: Kerala
- District: Malappuram

Government
  - Body: Gram panchayat

Population (2001)
  - Total: 35,795

Languages
  - Official: Malayalam, English
- Time zone: UTC+5:30 (IST)
- PIN: 676552
- Telephone code: 0494
- Vehicle registration: KL-55, KL -10
- Nearest city: Malappuram
- Sex ratio: 1047 ♂/♀
- Literacy: 93%
- Lok Sabha constituency: Ponnani
- Civic agency: Irimbiliyam/Grama Panchayath/
- Climate: Normal (Köppen)

Valiyakunnu is a town located in Malappuram district, Kerala, India.

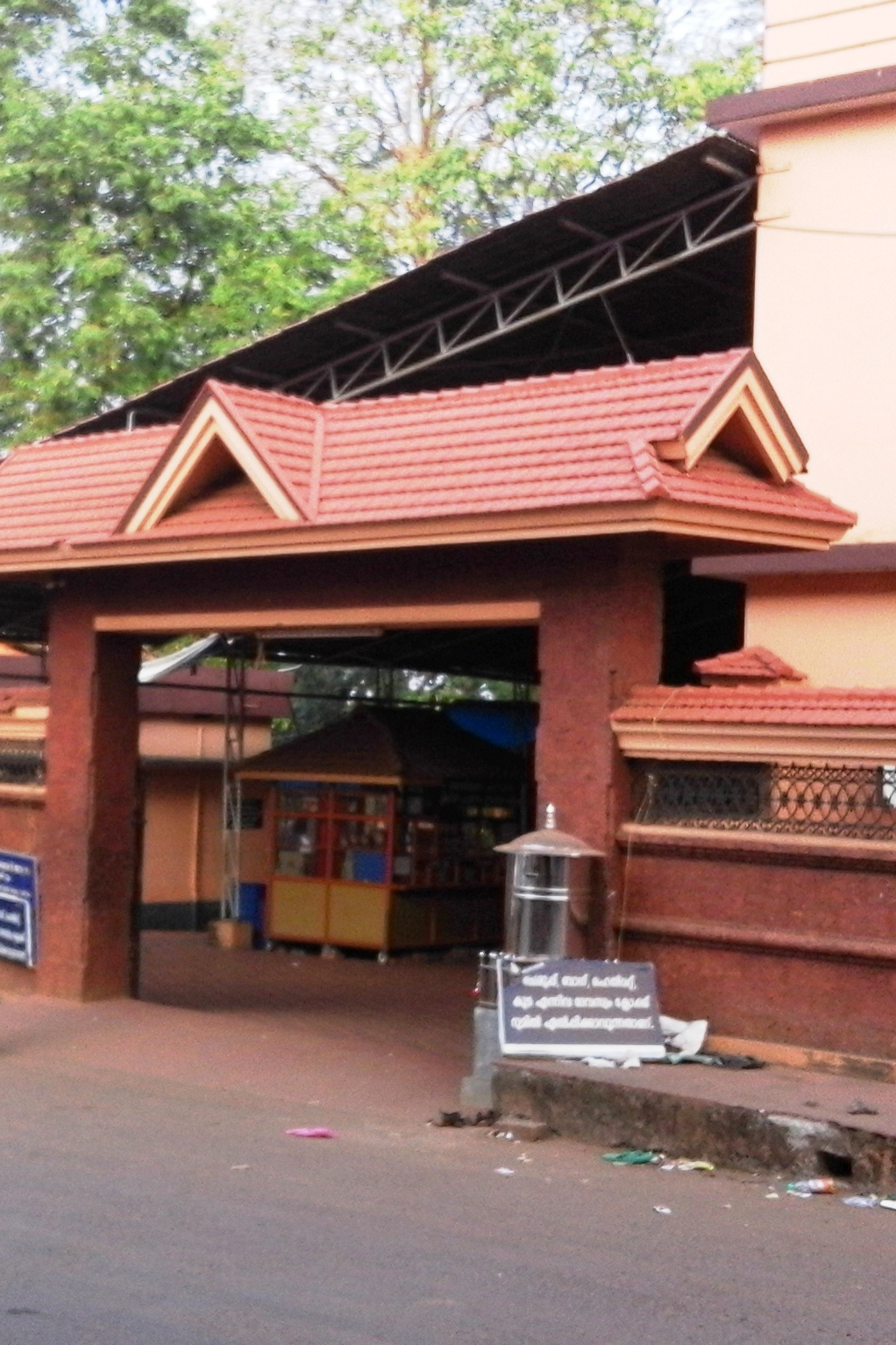
Devi Temple, Kadampuzha

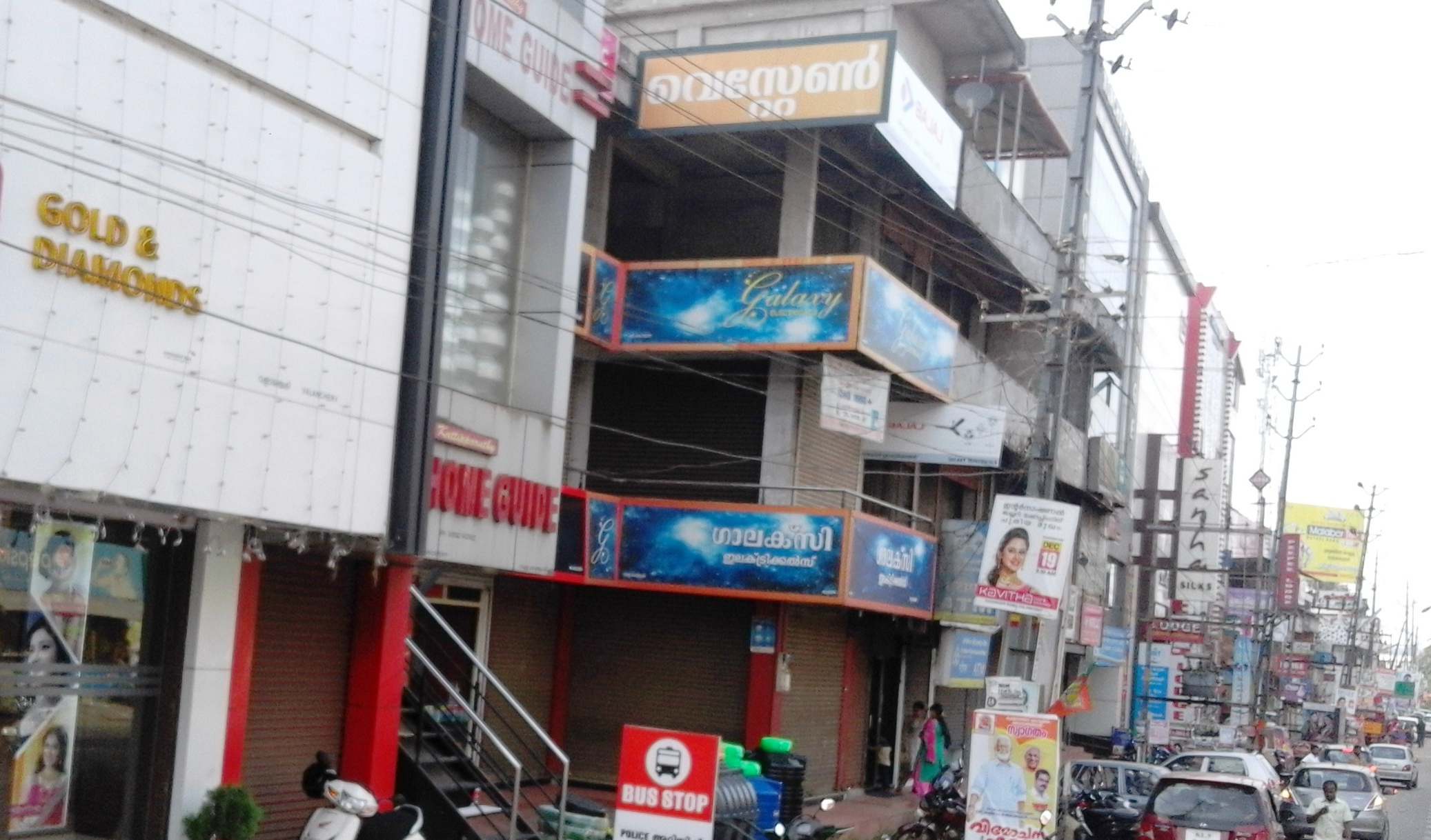
Valanchery Town

== Demographics ==
At the 2011 India census, Valanchery/ Kattipparuthi had a population of 35,795. Males constituted 48.86% (17,490) and females 51.13% (18,305). The number of households in Valanchery was listed as 5,926.

== Notable persons ==
- K T Jaleel, politician and social worker
- Unni Menon, playback singer
- Shweta Menon, actress

== Culture ==
Valanchery village is a predominantly Muslim populated area. Hindus exist in comparatively smaller numbers. So the culture of the locality is based upon Muslim traditions. Duff Muttu, Kolkali and Aravanamuttu are common folk arts of this locality. There are many libraries attached to mosques giving a rich source of Islamic studies. Most of the books are written in Arabi-Malayalam which is a version of the Malayalam language written in Arabic script. People gather in mosques for the evening prayer and continue to sit there after the prayers discussing social and cultural issues. Business and family issues are also sorted out during these evening meetings. The Hindu minority of this area keeps their rich traditions by celebrating various festivals in their temples. Hindu rituals are done here with a regular devotion like other parts of Kerala.

== Transportation ==
Valanchery village connects to other parts of India through National highway No.66 passes through valanchery, kuttippuram, Ponnani and the northern stretch connects to Goa and Mumbai. The southern stretch connects to Cochin and Trivandrum. The nearest airport is at Kozhikode. The nearest major railway stations are at Kuttippuram, Tirur.
