= Islamic Institute of Toronto =

Educational institute in Scarborough, Ontario, Canada

Coordinates: 43.81877°N 79.22992°W

Islamic Institute of Toronto (IIT)
- Other name: IIT
- Motto: التعليم لحياة أفضل (Arabic) "Education for Virtuous Living"
- Type: Public
- Established: 1996
- Chairman: Irfan Khan (2025-present)
- Chancellor: Ahmad Kutty
- Location: 1630 Neilson Road, Scarborough, Ontario, Canada
- Campus: Urban, 8 acres (3.2 ha)
- Colours: Green and grey
- Sporting affiliations: Islamic Institute Ball Hockey League, Soccer League, Japan Karate Association, Scouts Canada ,
- Website: www.islamicinstitute.ca

The Islamic Institute of Toronto (IIT) is a non-profit Islamic educational institute in Toronto, Canada.

== History ==
The IIT was established in 1996. In 2005 the IIT joined other Canadian imams in denouncing terrorism. In 2013 the IIT helped fund a Muslim prayer space at Emmanuel College.

In 2020 the IIT cancelled in person prayer services due to the COVID-19 pandemic. Digital services and outdoor services were held in their place. The campus hosted pop-up testing centers during the pandemic.

== Campus ==
The Campus includes a conference center, triple gymnasium, library, a mosque, and a swimming pool. The complex will also be home to an Islamic High School that will cater to Muslim students.

Phase One of the building project is in its advanced stages with the building constructed while finishing touches are placed. Phase One will consist of a classroom, library, multi-purpose hall, and other necessary amenities.

== Academics ==
The IIT's elementary school program ranked in the top 20 in Ontario according to a 2019 report by the Fraser Institute.

=== Courses ===
The Islamic Institute of Toronto curriculum includes courses on Islamic faith and jurisprudence, Fiqh, Qur'anic Studies, Islamic History, and Arabic. Fees vary between courses and are typically around $70. There is no formal sponsorship of students.

Certificates are offered in Classical Arabic, Access to Qur'anic Arabic, and Modern Standard Arabic. The Faculty of Qur'anic Studies offer certificate programs aimed at understanding the Qur'an, its revelation, transmission, message, and recitation (qirat).

The Faculty of Islamic Studies offers certificate programs in Islamic Studies on two levels - Level One Certificate and Level Two Certificate. The curriculum covers:

- Aqidah
- Fiqh
- Usul al-fiqh
- Ibaadat (Salaah, Zakaah, Fasting and Hajj)
- Islamic Ethics
- Hadith Studies
- Islamic History and Civilization
- Islamic Spirituality
- Quranic Sciences
- Marriage and Family Life

=== Other programs ===
Since 2007 the IIT has had a scouting group: the 163rd IIT Scouts group

== See also ==
- Islam in Canada
- Religious education in Canada
