= Chakkeeri Ahamed Kutty =

Indian politician and social worker

Member of Legislative Assembly (Kuttippuram)
- Constituency: Kuttippuram

Personal details
- Born: 1915
- Died: 4 January 1993 (aged 77–78)
- Party: Indian National Congress; Indian Union Muslim League
- Spouse: Safiya

Chakkeeri Ahamed Kutty (1915–1993) was an Indian politician and social worker from Indian Union Muslim League who served as the Minister for Education from 1973 to 1977 in the coalition government headed by Communist Party of India Chief Minister C. Achutha Menon. He later served as the Speaker of Kerala Legislative Assembly from 1977 to 1980.

Kutty was an Indian National Congress worker before joining the Muslim League. He also served as the Secretary, Muslim League Legislature Party and Member, Muslim League Working Committee.

== Member of Legislative Assembly ==
- Madras Legislative Assembly (1952–56) – Kottakkal Constituency
- 1st Kerala Legislative Assembly (1957–59) – Kuttipuram Constituency
- 3rd Kerala Legislative Assembly (1969–70) – Malappuram Constituency (elected in by-election in 1969)
- 4th Kerala Legislative Assembly (1970–77) – Kuttippuram Constituency
- 5th Kerala Legislative Assembly (1977–80) – Kuttippuram Constituency
