= Athippatta Moideen Kutty Musliyar =

Indian Islamic scholar

Athippatta Muhyudheen Kutty Musliyar Musliyar
- Athippatta Usthad
- Born: Muhyudheen Kutty; 18 September 1936; Achippura, Kottakkal, British India
- Died: 19 December 2018 (aged 82); Athippatta, Valanchery
- Resting place: Fath-hul Fathah, Athippatta, Valanchery; W447+54P, SH73, Puramannur, Kerala 676552, India
- Other names: Sheikh Muhyudheen Abdul Qayyoom
- Known for: Islamic Sufi scholar, Islamic Preacher

Athippatta Moideen Kutty Musliyar also known as Athippatta Usthad (19 September 1936 – 19 December 2018), was an Islamic scholar, community leader and founder of Ikhvani Trust (non-profit educational institution) and Grace Valley Public School,Kadampuzha

== Personal life and education ==
He was born on 18 September 1936 at Achippura near Kottakkal in Malappuram district. His father was Palakat Moiteenkutty Musliar who was a Mappila poet, writer, physician and teacher. After his primary education, he studied religion under his paternal uncle Kunjalankutty Musliyar, Anakkara Saidalavi Musliyar, Pulicode Moithu Musliyar and Vahsi Muhammad Musliar.

He had worked in Achippura Cheruparamb Madrasa, noorul islam madrsa south Vallam Perumbavoor, Kizhekkeppura Randathani Madrasa, Pantharangadi madrasa, Trissur Akalad Madrasa, Sirathu Saviyy Madrasa Cherpp Cheruchenam.

He was Imam under UAE Awqaf for 28 years (1977-2006).

In 1988 Mohyudheen kutty Musliar became the founder and chairman of Al Ain Darul huda School.

== Death ==
Moideen Kutty Musliyar died of age-related disease at a his residence in Valanchery Athippatta on 19 December 2018, at the age of 82

On 20 December 2018, Athippatta Moideen Kutty Musliyar was laid to rest at Valanchery Athippatta.
