= K. K. Abid Hussain Thangal =

Indian politician

Abid Hussain Thangal (K. K. Syed Abid Hussain Thangal)
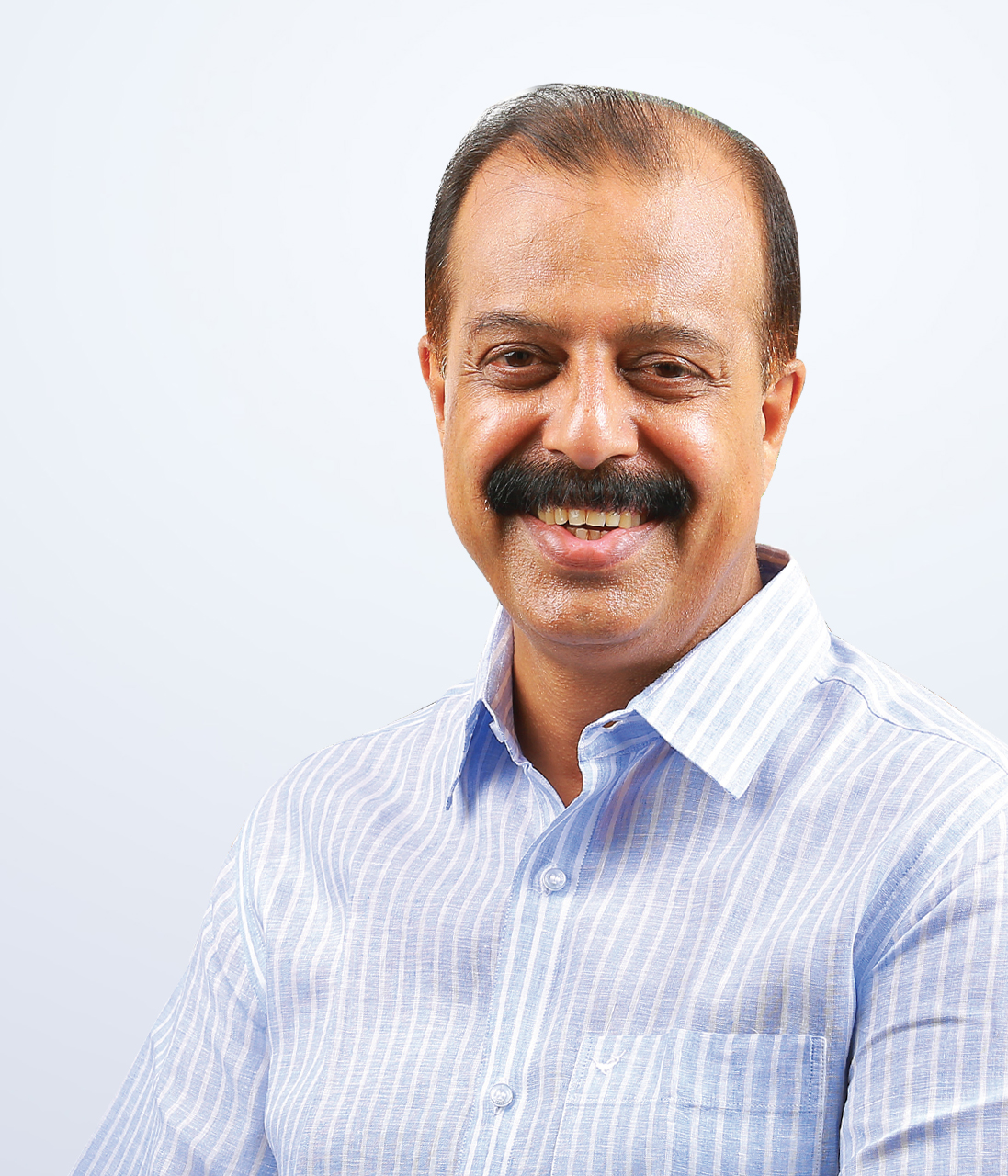

Member of Kerala Niyamasabha
- Incumbent
- Assumed office 2016
- Preceded by: M. P. Abdussamad Samadani
- Constituency: Kottakkal (State Assembly constituency)

Personal details
- Born: 29 May 1960 (age 66) Kelloor
- Party: Indian Union Muslim League
- Spouse: Smt. Sulaikha Jifri
- Children: 3

Abid Hussain Thangal is an Indian politician, who has been MLA of Kottakkal, Kerala since 2016.

== 2021 Kerala State Assembly election ==
Thangal defeated N.A Muhammed Kutty (Mammuty) from Nationalist Congress Party in 2021 assembly elections in Kottakkal (State Assembly) constituency. He secured a vote share of 51.08% and a winning margin of 16,588 votes.

2021 Kerala Legislative Assembly election: Kottakkal
Party	Candidate	Votes	%	±%
IUML	PROF. ABID HUSSAIN THANGAL	81,700	51.08%	▲2.74
NCP	N. A. MUHAMMED KUTTY (MAMMUTY)	65112	40.71	▲2.5
BJP	P. P. GANESAN	10796	6.75%	▼2.14
Independent	AYISHA	328	0.21%	N/A
Independent	BINDHU DEVARAJAN	481	0.3%	▼0.12
Independent	MOHAMED KUTTY	675	0.042%	N/A
Independent	SAINUL ABID THANGAL	173	0.11%	▲0.1
NOTA	NOTA	668	0.42%	▼0.12
Margin of victory		16,588	10.37%	▲0.24
Turnout		1,59,933	72.35%	▼2.3
IUML hold		Swing	▲2.74	
