= Kuttippuram railway station =

Railway station in Kerala, India

Kuttippuram Railway Station KUTTIPURAM
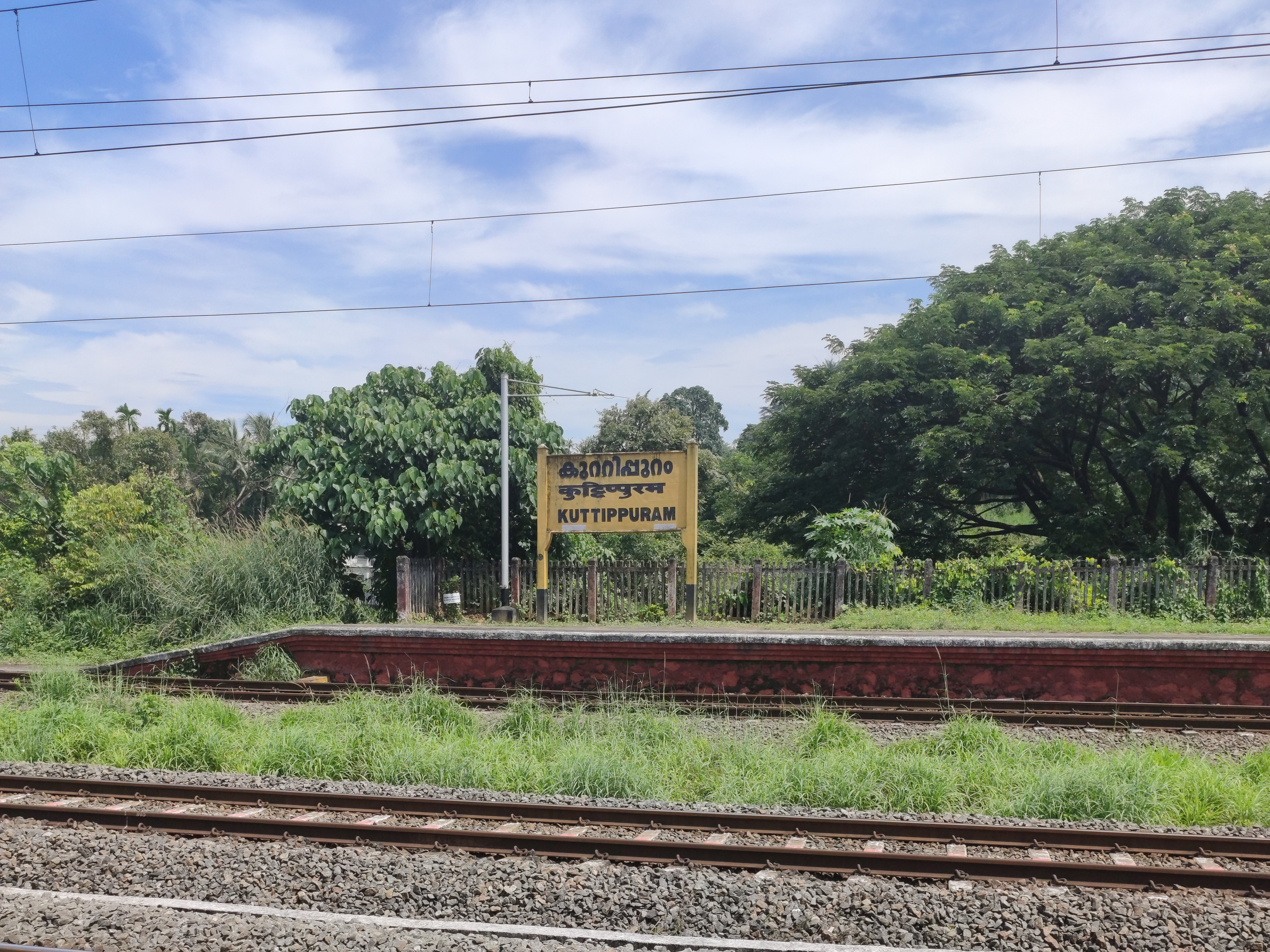
- Kuttippuram railway station

General information
- Location: Kuttippuram, Malappuram district, Kerala; India
- Coordinates: 10.8456019°N 76.0337296°E
- Elevation: 13 m (43 ft)
- System: Indian Railways station
- Owner: Indian Railways
- Operator: Southern Railway zone
- Line: Shoranur–Mangalore section
- Platforms: 2
- Tracks: 4
- Connections: Bus stand, Taxicab stand, Auto rickshaw stand

Construction
- Structure type: At–grade
- Parking: Available
- Accessible: Disabled access

Other information
- Status: Functioning
- Station code: KTU
- Zone(s): Southern Railway zone
- Division(s): Palakkad

History
- Opened: 1888; 138 years ago
- Closed: 2022
- Rebuilt: YES, 9 MONTHS BEFORE
- Former names: MALAPPURAM

Passengers
- 29,000
Route map
- SHORANUR MANGLORE SECTION
Location
- Location within India Location within Kerala

Kuttippuram railway station (station code: KTU) is an NSG–4 category Indian railway station in Palakkad railway division of Southern Railway zone. It is a railway station in the Malappuram district, Kerala.

== History ==
Tirur railway station, which is one of the nearest stations to Kuttippuram. is the oldest railway station in the Indian state of Kerala. The railway line from Tirur to Beypore is the oldest railway line in the state which also consists of other railway stations at Tanur, Parappanangadi, and Vallikkunnu. The Tirur–Beypore railway line started functioning on March 12, 1861. In the same year, a railway line from Tirur to Kuttippuram was laid via Tirunavaya and it started function on May 1, 1861. Kuttippuram railway station is one of the oldest railway stations in the state. Later in 1862, the railway line was expanded from Kuttippuram to Pattambi, and later it was again expanded from Pattambi to Podanur in the same year. Later the Chennai–Mangalore railway line was formed as an extension of the Beypore–Podanur line formed in the years 1861–1862.

== See also ==
- Kuttippuram bridge
- Bharathappuzha
- Vairankode Vela
