= Vettichira =

- village
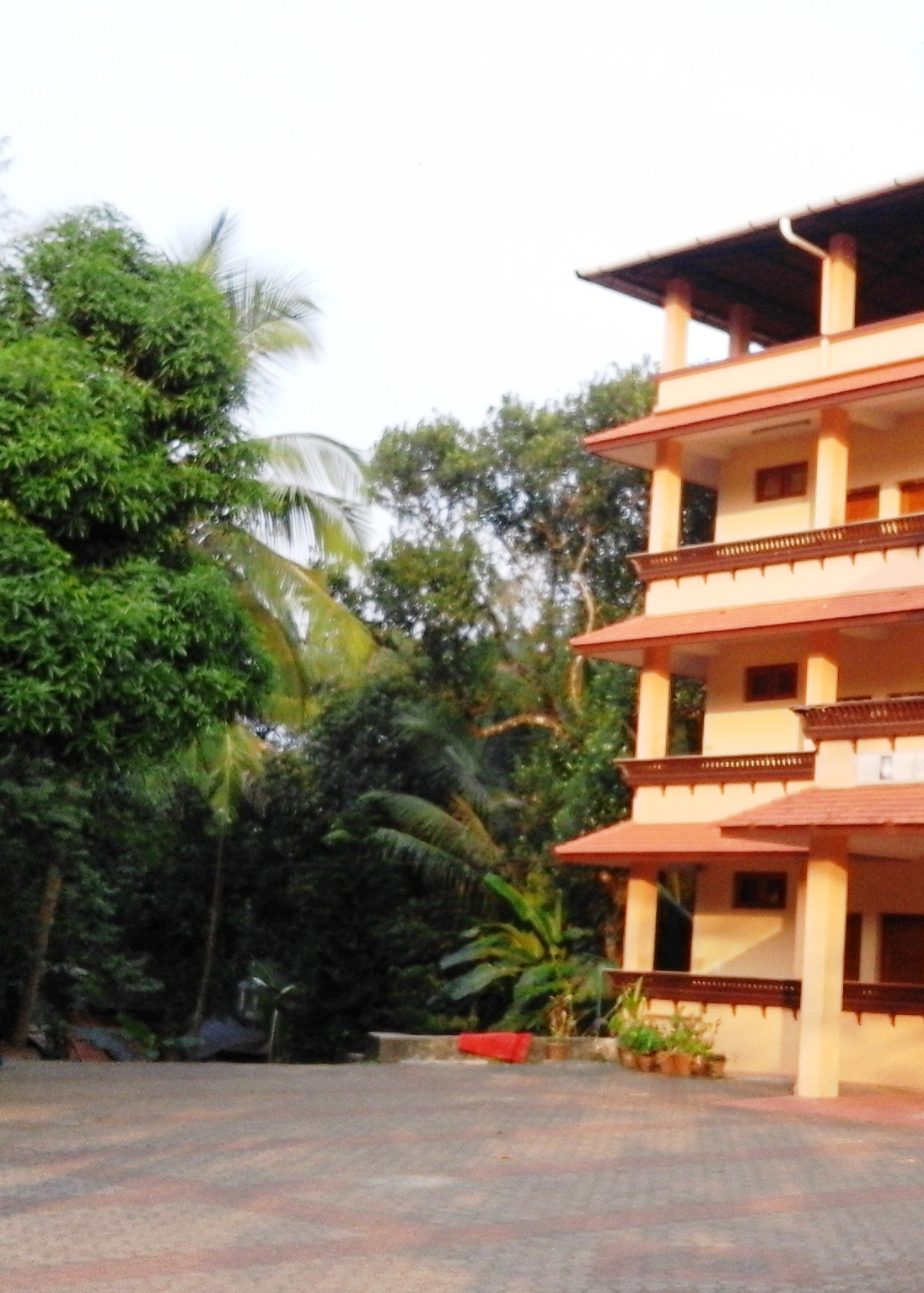
- Kadampuzha Guest House
- Interactive map of Vettichira
- Coordinates: 10°53′30″N 75°59′30″E
- Country: India
- State: Kerala
- District: Malappuram

Population (2001)
  - Total: 19,414

Languages
  - Official: Malayalam, English
- Time zone: UTC+5:30 (IST)
- PIN: 676 301
- Telephone code: 0494 257
- Vehicle registration: KL-55
- Nearest city: Thirunnavaya
- Lok Sabha constituency: Ponnani
- Vidhan Sabha constituency: Tirur

Vettichira, Chandanakkavu is a town in Malappuram district in the state of Kerala, India.

== Demographics ==
As of 2001 India census, Vettichira had a population of 19414 with 9586 males and 9828 females.

== Chandanakkavu ==
Chandanakkavu is located 13 km. North-east of Valanchery and about 5 km. south of Vettichira in Kurumbathur village in north Kerala (Malabar), India. It is the birthplace of the 16th-century poet, Melpathur Bhattathiripad.

== Transportation ==
Vettichira village connects to other parts of India through Valanchery town. National highway No.66 passes through Valanchery and the northern stretch connects to Goa and Mumbai. The southern stretch connects to Cochin and Trivandrum. State Highway No.28 starts from Nilambur and connects to Ooty, Mysore and Bangalore through Highways.12,29 and 181. National Highway No.966 connects to Palakkad and Coimbatore. The nearest airport is at Kozhikode. The nearest major railway station is at Tirur.
