= K. T. Jaleel =

Indian politician

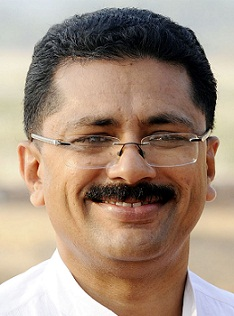

Member of the Kerala Legislative Assembly
- In office 13 May 2011 – 23 May 2026
- Preceded by: Constituency established
- Succeeded by: V. S Joy
- Constituency: Thavanur
- In office 11 May 2006 – 13 May 2011
- Preceded by: P. K. Kunhalikutty
- Succeeded by: Constituency abolished
- Constituency: Kuttippuram

Minister for Higher Education & Minority Welfare, Government of Kerala
- In office 14 August 2018 – 13 April 2021
- Chief Minister: Pinarayi Vijayan
- Preceded by: Prof. C. Raveendranath (Minister For Education)
- Succeeded by: Dr (Prof) R. Bindu; (Higher Education)

Minister for Minority Welfare & Local Self Governments, Government of Kerala
- In office 25 May 2016 – 14 August 2018
- Preceded by: Manjalamkuzhi Ali (Minister For Minority Welfare, Municipality, Corporation and Urban Affairs); M. K. Muneer (Minister For Panchayath Affairs)
- Succeeded by: A. C. Moideen

Personal details
- Born: 30 May 1967 (age 59)
- Party: Communist Party of India (Marxist)
- Spouse: Fathima Jaleel
- Children: 3
- Education: Doctor of Philosophy

K. T. Jaleel (born 30 May 1967) is an Indian politician from Kerala and a former Member of Legislative Assembly (MLA) from Thavanur and has served as Minister for Higher Education, Welfare of Minorities, Waqf and Hajj in the Left Democratic Front (LDF) -led ministry. He was first elected to Kerala Legislative Assembly in 2006. He was an Associate Professor of History at P. S. M. O. College, Tirurangadi. He previously served as Minister for Local Self Governments, Government of Kerala.

== Education ==
He completed his Primary education from GUPS-Painkanur, Valanchery and AUPS Velimukku. His secondary education was from Government Higher secondary School, Kuttippuram. He did his pre-degree from Islahiya College, Chenamangalur, and his Graduation and Post-graduation from Pocker Sahib Memorial Orphanage College (PSMO College), Tirurangadi. He owns an M.Phil-degree from University of Calicut and Ph.D. from Kerala University, Thiruvananthapuram for the topic "Role of Variyamkunnath Kunjahammed Haji and Ali Musliyar in the Malabar Rebellion of 1921". He is currently Associate Professor in History, in Pocker Sahib Memorial Orphanage College (PSMO) College, Tirurangadi and settled at Valanchery.

== Political life ==
He was a follower of the Students' Islamic Movement of India, leader as a student and a chairman, then joined the Muslim Students Federation, the students’ wing of the Indian Union Muslim League. He was ousted from the youth wing of IUML following differences with the leadership. Afterwards he contested independently with LDF support.

He was elected as an MLA for the first time in 2006, from Kuttippuram constituency as LDF supported Independent candidate, defeating the then IUML General Secretary P. K. Kunhalikutty. In 2011 he was elected from Thavanoor constituency, defeating V. V. Prakash of Indian National Congress by a margin of 6,854 votes. In 2016 he was reelected from Thavanoor, with a majority of 17,064, against P. Ifthiquarudheen of Indian National Congress.

Jaleel had come under fire after being accused of nepotism by P.K.Firos of Indian Union Muslim League over the appointment of his cousin as the general manager of Kerala State Minorities Development Finance Corporation (KSMDFC). Kerala High Court had dismissed the plea regarding the same on 11 July 2019 and criticised the political agendas behind the petition by Firos. Jaleel was accused of links to the 2020 Kerala gold smuggling case and was questioned by Enforcement Directorate (ED) and the National Investigation Agency (NIA). He denied any involvement, saying that the contact with one of the accused Swapna was regarding a charity work as suggested by the Consulate General of UAE.

K T Jaleel resigned four days after a state anti-corruption ombudsman declared him to be guilty of “favouritism and nepotism”. K T Jaleel was elected from the constituency Thavanoor in Malapuram defeating Firos Kunamparambil a charity worker with a vote margin of 2,564 Votes in 2021 Kerala Assembly Election.

== Positions held ==
He held positions such as: Chairman, P.S. M.O. College Union; he served as MSF chairman in his education period, Malappuram District Council; Director, Kerala Automobiles Ltd and Malcotex, Karthala Chungam; General Secretary, Kerala State Muslim Youth League; Chairman, Standing Committee on Education and Health, District Panchayat Malappuram; Syndicate member, Calicut University; Director of Norka Roots.

== Controversies ==
In 2021, KT resigned from the Pinarayi Vijayan cabinet after the Kerala Lokayukta found that in 2018, he had abused his official position in the appointment of a relative to the Kerala State Minorities Development Finance Corporation.

In 2020, he was questioned as a witness by the National Investigation Agency (NIA) in connection with a Gold smuggling case in Kerala involving Diplomatic Cargo to the UAE Consulate.

Jaleel has also been involved in controversies related to his public statements, including a Facebook post concerning Kashmir, where he used the terms "Indian-occupied Kashmir" and "Azad Kashmir", contrary to India's claims in the region.
