= Cheriyamundam =

Village in Kerala, India

- Village
- Location in Kerala, India Cheriyamundam (India)
- Coordinates: 10.949°N 75.948°E
- Country: India
- State: Kerala
- District: Malappuram
- PIN: 676106
- Vehicle registration: KL 55

Cheriyamundam is a village and Grama Panchayat in Kerala, India. It covers an area of 11.95 km^{2} and includes 25,760 (1991) inhabitants. It lies near the Tirur River.

== History ==
Most of the land in this area was earlier under Kozhikode Samuthiri and Thrikkandyur Devaswam. After the passing of land reform act by Kerala government in 1956, land was distributed to tenants.

== Places of interest ==
A number of old mosques and temples are there in this panchayat. Iringavur Juma masjid, Vaniyannur Juma masjid, Choppante Mantakm temple, are some of the ancient religious centres. An ancient British bungalow is also located here.

== Transportation ==
Cheriyamundam village connects to other parts of India through Tirur town. National highway No.66 passes through Valanchery and the northern stretch connects to Goa and Mumbai. The southern stretch connects to Cochin and Trivandrum. Highway No.966 goes to Palakkad and Coimbatore. The nearest airport is at Kozhikode. The nearest major railway station is at Tirur.
