= Edayoor =

- village
- Location in Kerala, India Edayoor (India)
- Coordinates: 10°54′0″N 76°6′0″E
- Country: India
- State: Kerala
- District: Malappuram

Population (2011)
  - Total: 36,498

Languages
  - Official: Malayalam, English
- Time zone: UTC+5:30 (IST)
- PIN: 676552
- Vehicle registration: KL-55, KL-10

Edayoor is a village in Malappuram district in the state of Kerala, India.

== Geography ==
Edayoor is located in Kuttippuram Block in Malappuram district of the Indian state of Kerala. It belongs to the North Kerala Division and is located 17 km south of district headquarters Malappuram.

Irimbilayam (8 KM), Moorkkanad (8 KM), Athavanad (8 KM), Marakkara (9 KM), Puzhakkattiri (11 KM) are nearby.. Edayoor is surrounded by Mankada Block to the North, Pattambi Block to the East, Vengara Block to the North and Trithala Block to the South .

Malappuram, Perinthalmanna, Tirur and Ponnani are nearby cities.

== Demographics ==
As of 2011 India census, Edayoor had a population of 36,498 with 17,763 males and 18,735 females.

== Transport ==
Edayoor village connects through Valanchery town. National highway No.66 passes through Valanchery and the northern stretch connects to Goa and Mumbai. The southern stretch connects to Cochin and Trivandrum. National Highway No.966 connects to Palakkad and Coimbatore. The nearest airport is at Kozhikode. The nearest major railway station is at Kuttippuram.

== Notability ==
The Edayur chilli is a variety of chilli mainly grown in this village. The Edayur chilli is a local cultivar primarily grown in specific regions of Malappuram district, Kerala, India. Specifically, it is cultivated in the panchayaths of Edayoor, Athavanad, Marakkara, Irimbiliyam, Kalpakanchery, and Valanchery within the Valanchery block, as well as Moorkanad and Kuruva panchayaths within the Angadippuram block.

The Edayur chilli's traditional cultivation grounds include hills, hillocks, and lateritic fields. Its physical appearance is marked by drooping, solitary berries with a moderately triangular shape with a smooth surface. The Edayur chilli is primarily utilized to create a traditional Malayalam delicacy called "Kondattom," or sun-dried curd chillies. These dried Kondattom Mulaku can be stored for several months, retaining their distinct flavor. When fried, Kondattom serves as a delectable side dish, paired with curd, making it a simple yet delightful accompaniment to meals.

== Notable personalities ==
- Ahmad Kutty, an internationally recognized Islamic scholar and father to Faisal Kutty, a renowned law professor, lawyer, columnist and public speaker.
