= M. P. Abdussamad Samadani =

Indian politician

M.P. Abdussamad Samadani
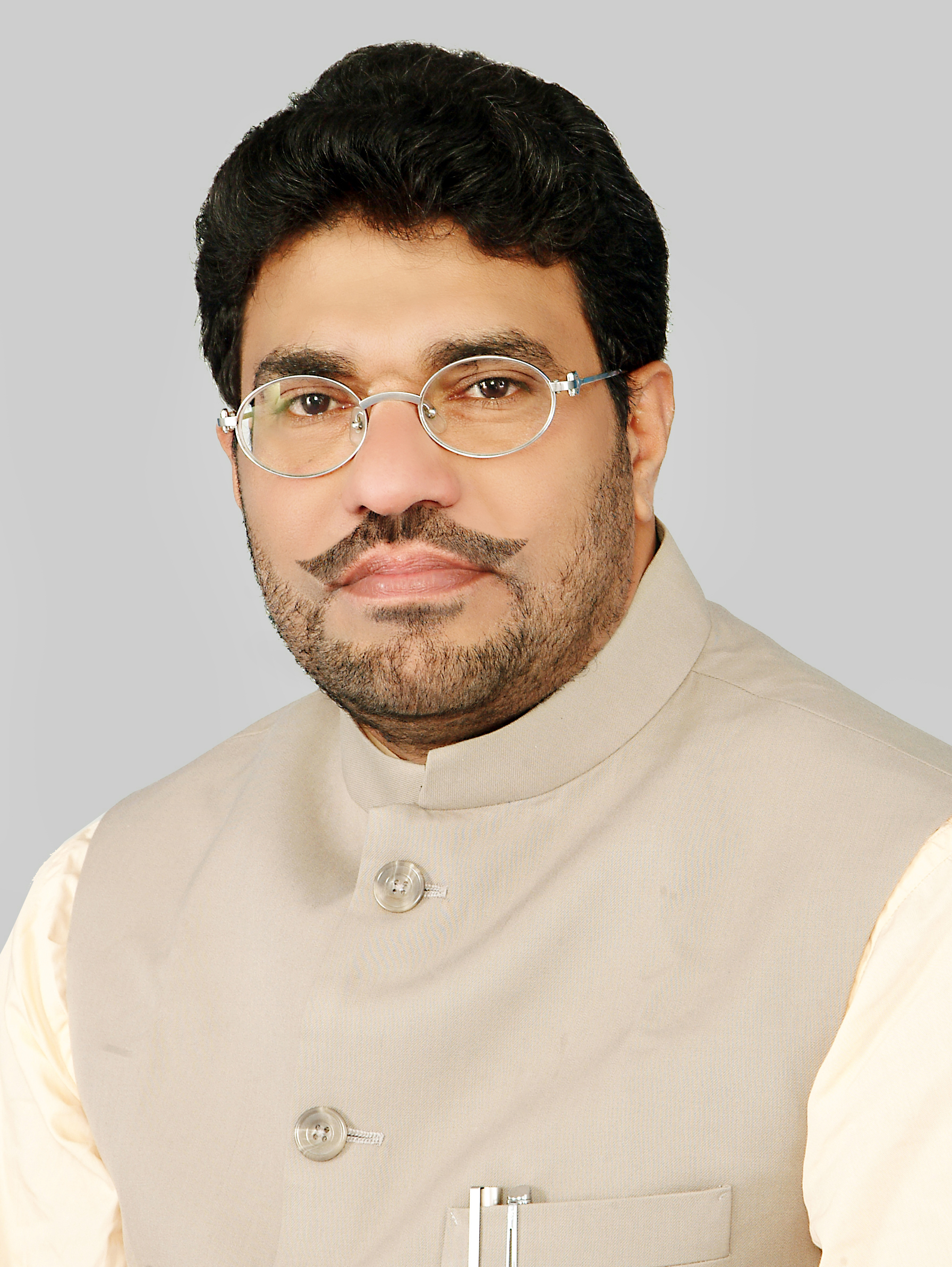

Member of Parliament, Lok Sabha
- Incumbent
- Assumed office 4 June 2024
- Preceded by: E. T. Mohammed Basheer
- Constituency: Ponnani, Kerala
- In office 2 May 2021 – 4 June 2024
- Preceded by: P. K. Kunhalikutty
- Succeeded by: E. T. Mohammed Basheer
- Constituency: Malappuram, Kerala

Member of the Kerala Legislative Assembly
- In office May 2011 – May 2016
- Succeeded by: K. K. Abid Hussain Thangal
- Constituency: Kottakkal

Member of Parliament, Rajya Sabha
- In office 1994 to 2006
- Constituency: Kerala

Personal details
- Born: 1 January 1959 (age 67) Kottakkal, Kerala, India
- Party: Indian Union Muslim League
- Spouse: Najeeba

M.P. Abdussamad Samadani (born 1 January 1959) is an Indian politician, orator, writer and scholar. He knows Malayalam, English, Urdu, Hindi, Arabic, Persian and Sanskrit languages. Samadani was awarded Doctor of Philosophy degree from JNU.

== Personal life ==
M.P. Abdussamad Samadani was born as son of M.P. Abdul Hameed Haidari and Ottakath Zainab on 1 January 1959 at Kottakkal, Malappuram district.

== Education ==
Samadani holds a BA (Rank 1), MA (Rank 2) from Farook College in 1982, and MPhil from University of Calicut in 1986, LLB from Government Law College, Kozhikode in 2003. He did his PhD from JNU, New Delhi.

== Political career ==
Samadani is a two time Parliament member (Rajya Sabha: 1994-2000, 2000-2006). He was a member of Kerala Legislative Assembly (Kottakkal constituency) from 2011 to 2016. He was nominated as the Convenor of the Parliamentary Sub-committee on Universities and Higher Education and Member of Central Advisory Board of Education, Government of India. He was also a member of India's official and parliamentary delegations to Saudi Arabia, Egypt, Syria and Jordan, appointed by the Union government. He also worked as a member of Kerala Sahitya Academy and Kerala Kalamandalam. He was elected as Member of parliament, Lok Sabha representing Malappuram (Lok Sabha constituency) through by - election held in 2021.

He was elected as Member of parliament, Lok Sabha representing Malappuram (Lok Sabha constituency) through by - election held in 2021.

In the 2024 Indian general election, he was elected as Member of parliament, Lok Sabha representing Ponnani (Lok Sabha constituency).

== As an orator ==
Samadani has translated the speeches of Manmohan Singh, Soniya Gandhi, Rahul Gandhi, Farooq Abdullah, Gulam Nabi Azad, Kapil Sibal, Mani Shankar Aiyar, Mulayam Singh Yadav, Nitish Kumar, Karan Singh, Gulzar, Raj Babbar, Maulana Abul Hasan Ali Hasani Nadwi, Arjun Singh, Kuldip Nayar, Pandit Jasraj, Ali Sardar Jafri, and Padmashree Shamsur Rahman Faruqi. Shri M. T. Vasudevan Nair called him ‘Vashya Vachassu’ (The Enchanting Word).

== Positions held ==
- 1994 – MP Rajya Sabha
- 2000 – MP Rajya Sabha
- 2002 to 2004 – Convener, Parliamentary Sub-Committee on Universities and Higher Education
- 2004 – Member, Central Advisory Board of Education, Government of India
- 2004 – Member, Parliamentary Committee on Health and Family Welfare
- 1995 to 1996 – Member, Parliamentary Committee on Defence
- 1996 to 1999 – Member, Parliamentary Committee on Subordinate Legislation
- 1996 to 2004 and 2004 to 2006 – Member, Parliamentary Committee on Human Resource Development
- 1996 to 2004 and 2004 to 2006 – Member, Consultative Committee for the Ministry of External Affairs
- 1998 to 1999 and 2004 to 2006 – Member, Parliamentary Committee on Papers Laid on the Table, Member, Papers Laid on the Table Parliamentary Committee
- 2001 - Member, Court of the AMU
- Member, Malappuram District Council
- Member, Kerala Sahitya Academy
- Member, Kerala Kalamandalam
- Senior Vice President, IUML
- Director, Indianness Academy
- Chairman, Maulana Azad Foundation
- Chairman, Sukumar Azhikode Foundation
- Patron, Kerala Sanskrit Prachara Samithi
- President, Anjuman Tarqi-e-Urdu, Kerala Branch
- Member of KLA Kottakkal 2011–16.
- MP Lok Sabha Malappuram 2021 -24.
- MP Lok Sabha Ponnani 2024 - incumbent.

== See also ==
- Syed Muhammedali Shihab Thangal
- Indian Union Muslim League
