= Valanchery =

Town in Kerala, India +91

- Municipal town
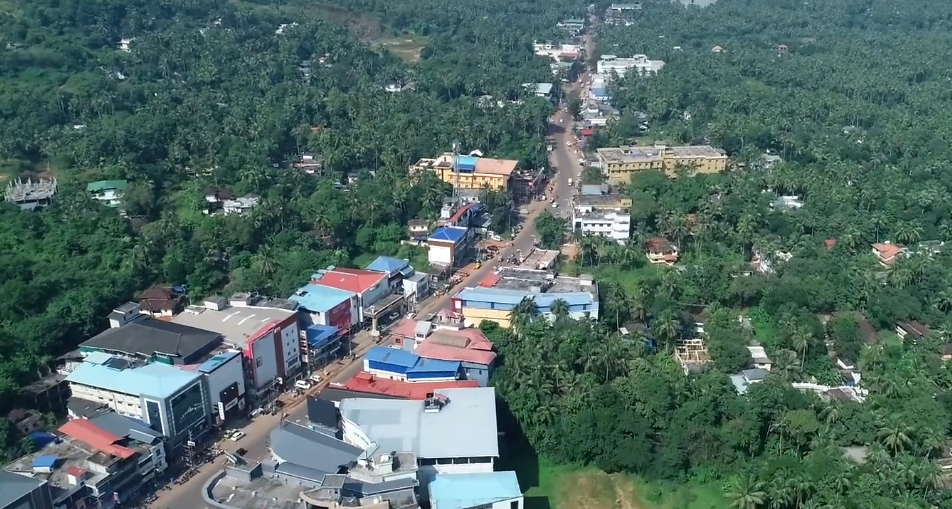
- An aerial view of Valanchery town

- Location in Kerala, India Valanchery (India) Valanchery (Asia) Valanchery (Earth)
- Coordinates: 10°53′0″N 76°4′0″E
- Country: India
- State: Kerala
- District: Malappuram
- Taluk: Tirur

Government
  - Type: Municipality
  - Body: Valanchery Municipality

Area
  - Total: 21.90 km^{2} (8.46 sq mi)
- Elevation: 30 m (98 ft)

Population (2011)
  - Total: 40,318
  - Density: 1,841/km^{2} (4,770/sq mi)

Languages
  - Official: Malayalam, English
- Time zone: UTC+5:30 (IST)
- PIN: 676552
- Telephone code: 0494
- Vehicle registration: KL-55, KL −10
- Nearest towns: Kuttippuram (8 km); Edappal (17 km); Ponnani (20 km); Tirur (21 km); Pattambi (22 km); Perinthalmanna (23 km); Kottakkal (20 km); Malappuram (25 km)
- Sex ratio: 1047 ♂/♀
- Literacy: 94.6%
- Niyamasabha constituency: Kottakkal
- Lok Sabha constituency: Ponnani
- Climate: Normal (Köppen)
- Website: valancherymunicipality.lsgkerala.gov.in/en/

Valanchery is a municipal town in Tirur Taluk, Malappuram district, Kerala, India. It is located about 40 kilometres (25 mi) southeast of Karipur International Airport and 25 kilometres (16 mi) south of the district headquarters, and forms a part of Malappuram metropolitan area. National Highway 66, from to Panvel to Kanyakumari, passes through Valanchery. During British Raj, Valanchery was included in the Ponnani Taluk of the erstwhile Malabar District.

== History ==
=== Early medieval period ===
Valanchery was originally part of the Valluvanad Swaroopam dynasty in the early medieval period (12th century CE). Valluvanad was an erstwhile princely state in the present state of Kerala, that extended from the Bharathappuzha river in the South to the Panthaloor Mala in the North. On the west, it was bounded by the Arabian Sea at Ponnani and on the east by the Attappadi Hills during their zenith in the early Middle Ages. The capital of erstwhile Valluvanad was at the present-day town of Angadipuram. According to local legends, the last Cheraman Perumal ruler gave a vast extension of land in South Malabar during his journey to Mecca to one of their governors, Valluvakonathiri, and left for pilgrimage. Valluvanad was famous for the Mamankam festivals, held once in 12 years and the endless wars against the Samoothiri of Kozhikode.

=== Late medieval period ===
The region came under the direct control of the Kozhikode Samoothiris in 13th/14th century CE by the defeat of Valluvakonathiris in Tirunavaya War. Assisted by the warriors of their subordinate chiefs (Chaliyam, Beypore, Tanur and Kodungallur) and the Muslim naval fleet under the Koya of Kozhikode, the Samoothiri's fighters advanced by both land and sea. The main force under the command of Samoothiri himself attacked, encamping at Triprangode, an allied force of Valluvanadu and Perumpadappu from the north. Meanwhile, another force under the Eralppadu commanded a fleet across the sea and landed at Ponnani and later moved to Thirumanasseri, with the intention to descend on Tirunavaya from the south with the help of the warriors of the Thirumanasseri Brahmins. Eralppadu also prevented the warriors of Perumpadappu from joining Valluvanadu forces. The Muslim merchants and commanders at Ponnani supported the Kozhikode force with food, transport, and provisions. The warriors of the Eralppadu moved north and crossed the Bharathappuzha and took up position on the northern side of the river. The Koya marched at the head of a large column and stormed Tirunavaya. In spite of the fact that the warriors of Valluvanadu did not get the timely help of Perumpadappu, they fought vigorously and the battle dragged on. In the meantime, the Kozhikode minister Mangattachan was also successful in turning Kadannamanna Elavakayil Vellodi (junior branch of Kadannamanna) to their side. Finally, two Valluvanadu princes were killed in the battles, the Nairs abandoned the settlement and Kozhikode infested Thirunavaya.

The battles along the western borders of Valluvanadu were bitter, for they were marked by treachery and crime. Panthalur and Ten Kalams came under Kozhikode only after a protracted struggle. The assassination of a minister of Kozhikode by the chief minister of Valluvanadu while visiting Kottakkal in Valluvanadu sparked the battle, which dragged on for almost a decade. At last, the Valluvanadu minister was captured by Samoothiri's warriors and executed at Padapparambu, and his province (Ten Kalams, including Kottakkal and Panthalur) was occupied by the Samoothiri. The Kizhakke Kovilakam Munalappadu, who took a leading part in this campaign, received half of the newly captured province from Samoothiri as a gift. The loss of this fiercely loyal chief minister was the greatest blow to Valluvanadu after the loss of Tirunavaya and Ponnani.

=== Colonial era ===
During the last decades of the eighteenth century, the army of the Kingdom of Mysore reached here. The region was annexed with the East India Company with the Treaty of Seringapatam, following the Third Anglo-Mysore War. Under the British Raj, Valanchery was an Amsom included in Cheranad which was scattered in the Taluks of Eranad and Ponnani in the erstwhile Malabar District. Cheranad had been under the direct rule of the Zamorin of Calicut during the late medieval period. The pottery industry and the blacksmith community, which has adopted it as a traditional caste occupation, were a part of Valanchery's identity. Changampally Mammi Gurukkal was a well-known figure in martial arts and neurology.

=== National movement ===
In 1932, as a part of the freedom struggle, a favorable environment was created for the seeds of a national political outlook to germinate in Valanchery. After the Guruvayur Temple Satyagraha and Kelappan's fast, a referendum was held to get the views of the upper caste Hindus of Ponnani taluk. The central office of the referendum was Valanchery. It was on this occasion that prominent national leaders including Kasturba Gandhi, C. R. Das's sister Urmila Devi, Sadashiva Rao, C. Rajagopalachari, and U. Gopala Menon, visited Valanchery. V. T. Bhattathiripad is also a notable figure in this group. The first Indian National Congress committee in Valanchery was formed in 1936. The Muslim League was formed in 1938 here. During the hike of rice prices, Valanchery Matta Rice had possessed a position in the newspapers. As a result of the efforts of Mazhuvanchery Damodaran Namboothiri and others, a united currency group (Aikya Nanaya Sangham) had functioned in Valanchery. After the war, as a result of K. Kelappan's efforts in Malabar, the Firka Consumer Co-operative Society was formed on a Firka basis. A cooperative society was also formed in Valanchery under the presidency of TKC Moideenkutty Kalathil. Today's Kuttippuram Service Co-operative Bank is a continuation of that.

=== Post-Independence ===
C. M. Ramakurup was the founding manager of Valanchery High School, which was started in 1951 at Puthenkalam, Kolamangalam. Today, it is the largest school under the private sector in the Tirur educational district. Kattipparuthi Grama Panchayat, which was upgraded to a Special Grade Panchayat in 1980, was renamed Valanchery in 1981. Valanchery became one of the major commercial and educational hubs of South Malabar region during the last decades. It was upgraded to a Municipality in the year 2015.

Now Valanchery is one of the 12 municipal towns in Malappuram district, and forms a part of the Malappuram metropolitan area, which is also the fourth largest urban agglomeration in the state according to the latest census conducted in 2011.

== Demographics ==
Religion in Valanchery (2011)
1. Islam (70.0%)
2. Hinduism (29.1%)
3. Christianity (0.79%)
4. Other (0.11%)

The total population under municipality limits is 40,318 according to the 2011 census. Males form 48.1% and females 51.9%. Malayalam is the widely spoken language in the town. Valanchery has been a multi-ethnic and multi-religious town since the early medieval period. The Muslims form the largest religious group, followed by Hindus. The municipality of Valanchery has an average literacy rate of 94.6%, which is higher than the state average of 94%.

== Civic administration ==
The town is administered by the Valanchery Municipality, headed by a chairperson. For administrative purposes, the town is divided into 33 wards, from which the members of the municipal council are elected for five years. The municipality comes under the jurisdiction of Valanchery police station, which was formed on 18 October 1988. Valanchery police station has also the jurisdiction over the villages of Athavanad, Edayur, Irimbiliyam, and Naduvattom, besides Valanchery town.

=== 2020 municipal election ===
S.No.	Party name	Party symbol	Number of Councillors
01	UDF		17
02	Independents		12
03	LDF		03
04	BJP		01

== Places of interest ==
- Ayyapanov Waterfalls
- Kuttippuram bridge
- Tirunavaya

== Notable people ==
- K. T. Jaleel, politician
- Ahmad Kutty, North American professor
- Faisal Kutty, lawyer, law professor, public speaker, orator
- Aneesh G. Menon, actor
- Shwetha Menon, actress
- Unni Menon, playback singer
- Zakariya Mohammed, director, scriptwriter and actor
- Athippatta Moideen Kutty Musliyar Islamic scholar
- K. V. Ramakrishnan, poet
- V. P. Sanu, politician
- Azhvanchery Thamprakkal

== See also ==
- Kuttippuram block
- Marakkara
- Vairankode
- Vattapara accident zone
