= Naduvattom, Malappuram =

Naduvattom
- Census town
- Location in Kerala, India Naduvattom (India)
- Coordinates: 10.88220°N 76.00822°E
- Country: India
- State: Kerala
- District: Malappuram

Population (2011)
  - Total: 21,273

Languages
  - Official: Malayalam, English
- Time zone: UTC+5:30 (IST)
- PIN: 679571
- Vehicle registration: KL-55

Naduvattom is a census town in Malappuram district in the state of Kerala, India.

== Demographics ==
As of 2011 India census, Naduvattom had a population of 21273 with 10,074 males and 11199 females.

== Transportation ==
Naduvattam village connects to other parts of India through Kuttippuram town. National highway No.66 passes through Edappal and the northern stretch connects to Goa and Mumbai. The southern stretch connects to Cochin and Trivandrum. National Highway No.966 connects to Palakkad and Coimbatore. The nearest airport is at Kozhikode. The nearest major railway station is at Kuttippuram.
