= K. V. Ramakrishnan =

Indian poet

K. V. Ramakrishnan is a Malayalam–language poet and journalist from Kerala state, South India. He received the Kerala Sahitya Akademi Award in the year 1997 for his work Akshara Vidya.

== Biography ==
Ramakrishnan was born in Kadampuzha in Malappuram district of Kerala as the son of M. Raghava Variar and K. V. Parvathy Varasyar. After completing graduation, he worked in the government service from 1954 to 1962 and then obtained his master's degree from Maharaja's College, Ernakulam. He was a professor of English language in Mar Athanasius College of Engineering, Kothamangalam and Sree Krishna College, Guruvayur from where he retired in 1988 to join Mathrubhumi as the assistant editor of the Mathrubhumi Weekly.

== Works ==
=== Essay ===
- Kavithayum Thalavum
- Kavya Chinthakal

=== Translation ===
- Dracula
- Kanakabharanam
- Rabindranath Tagore

== Awards ==
- 1997: Kerala Sahitya Akademi Award for Poetry - Akshara Vidya
- 2015: Deviprasadam Trust Award
- Kanakasree Award - Akshara Vidya
- State Bank of India Literary Award
