= Ponmala =

Ponmala പൊന്മള
- Village
- Nickname: ponmala
- Interactive map of Ponmala
- Coordinates: 11.02208°N 76.04324°E
- Country: India
- State: Kerala
- District: Malappuram

Government
  - Type: Grama Panjayath

Population (2011)
  - Total: 33,922

Languages
  - Official: Malayalam, English
- Time zone: UTC+5:30 (IST)
- PIN: 676528
- Vehicle registration: KL-10 : Malappuram SRTO (Tirur Taluk)
- Lok Sabha constituency: Ponnani
- Website: facebook.com/PonmalaOfficial

Ponmala is a village and suburb of Malappuram.

== Demographics ==
As of 2011 India census, Ponmala had a population of 33,922 with 16087 males and 17835 females.
