= Ahmad Kutty =

20th and 21st-century Indian Islamic scholar

- Born: 1946 (age 79–80); Edayur, Valanchery, Kerala, India
- Awards: One of The 500 Most Influential Muslims in the World

Academic background
- Education: Islamiya College Santapuram Islamic University of Madinah University of Toronto

Academic work
- Main interests: Islam
- Notable ideas: Moderation

Ahmad Kutty (born 1946 in Valanchery, Kerala, India) is a North American Islamic scholar. He is currently senior resident Islamic scholar at the Islamic Institute of Toronto and has taught at Emanuel College of the University of Toronto as an adjunct instructor. He is the father of Faisal Kutty.

== Early education and background ==
Kutty graduated in the traditional Islamic sciences and received the Ijazah (title) of al-Faqih fi al-ddeen (first rank) from Islamiya College Santapuram, a leading Islamic institution in south India. He served as an editor for the Jamaat Kerala mouthpiece Probadhanam. During his tenure he also translated Sayyid Qutb's Social Justice (al-adalatul ijtimaiyyah fi al-Islam) into Malayalam (first published in 1969). (Note: i.p.h publications no:74, Islamic Publishing House, Calicut, Kerala, India).

Kutty earned a scholarship to study at the Islamic University of Madinah, Saudi Arabia, from where he obtained his Licentiate in Usul al-Ddeen (first rank passing at the top of his class in 1972).

In 1972, he arrived in Canada with a scholarship to pursue his M.A. in Islamic studies from the University of Toronto. He went on to further his doctoral studies at the McGill University Institute of Islamic Studies where he earned scholarships (from 1975 to 1980) to pursue his research under the supervision of Professor Charles Adams and Prof. A. Üner Turgay. The Institute, established in 1952 by Wilfred Cantwell Smith, is the first institute of Islamic studies in North America.

During a visit to India in 1976, an arrest warrant was issued for Shaikh Kutty under The Emergency (India) declared by Prime Minister Indira Gandhi's administration mainly (for his translation work with Islamic Publishing House and Probodhanam Weekly, the mouthpiece of Kerala Jamaate). In India, "the Emergency" refers to a 21-month period in 1975–77 when Prime Minister Indira Gandhi unilaterally had a state of emergency declared across the country. Officially issued by President Fakhruddin Ali Ahmed under Article 352(1) of the Constitution for "internal disturbance", the Emergency was in effect from 25 June 1975 until its withdrawal on 21 March 1977.

His son Faisal Kutty recounts as one of his earliest childhood memories as running from safe house to safe house, until the family was able to leave India.

In 2003, Shaikh Kutty made international headlines when he and Imam Abdul Hamid were detained and held in a Fort Lauderdale jail after disembarking from their flight on 11 September. The two were travelling to Florida to speak at an Islamic conference. He is a well-known scholar, preacher and speaker on Islam and Muslims. He was also one of the first and most vocal imams to condemn the terrorist attacks on the twin towers in the same day in a Friday Sermon at the Islamic Center of Toronto.

Furthermore, among the topics to be discussed at the conference in Orlando was the dangers of extremism and fanaticism. After returning to Canada, Shaikh Kutty asked:

But if the American immigration officials can go after me and Hamid who are well-known for preaching moderation, what happens to ordinary Muslims?

== Career ==
Kutty served as an Imam in various mosques and Islamic centers in Montreal during his McGill days. He then held the following positions:

- 1973–1975: Assistant Director: Islamic Center of Toronto
- 1979–1982: Director/Imam: Islamic Center of Toronto
- 1984–1995: Director/Imam Islamic Foundation of Toronto
- 1996—Resident Scholar & Senior Lecturer, Islamic Institute of Toronto

Kutty has served on the Fiqh Council of North America, the pre-eminent Islamic law body on the continent. He has served as Imam and resident scholar at various institutions in Montreal and Toronto, including Toronto's Jami Mosque and the Islamic Foundation of Toronto. He is currently resident scholar at the Islamic Institute of Toronto.

He was at one point a regular scholar answering Islamic law questions on IslamOnline.

His speech to the Students Islamic Organisation of India Kerala annual conference in 2012 focusing on the crisis in the Muslim world is illustrative of his view and approach. Shaikh Kutty was one of the 120 imams across Canada who signed a statement condemning acts of terrorism. The statement coordinated by the Canadian Council on American-Islamic Relations read:

Anyone who claims to be a Muslim and participates in any way in the taking of innocent life is betraying the very spirit and letter of Islam.

== Bibliography ==
Kutty has authored many books, papers, scholar courses etc.

=== Scholarly papers/works/publications ===
1. Living the Path: Lessons from the life of the Prophet Muhammad (2014)
2. You Wanted to Know: Questions & Answers on Islam (2014)
3. Ramadan and Fasting: A concise Guide (2014).
4. Ali Mazrui: A Post-Modern Ibn Khaldun: Reflections on the legacy of Professor Mazrui (1933 – 2014
5. Dr. Zafar Ishaq Ansari (1932–2016): Humble Muslim, Brilliant Academic
6. Ghazali’s method of Spiritual Therapy
7. An analytical study of Ibn Taymiyyahs al-Aqidat al-Wasitiyyah (1978)
8. An analytical study of Ibn Khalduns Shifa al-sail fi tahdhib al-masaail (1976)
9. Al-Nass wa al-ikhtiyaar fi al-khilafah: A Comparative Study of the Sunni and the Shiah Theories of Khilafah/Imamah (1982)
10. Kitab al-Tawhid of Abu Mansur al-Maturidi (d. 944): A report on his work with reference to his role in the development of Kalam (1978)
11. Abolition of Khilafah and the reaction of the Muslim world (1976)
12. Shah Waliullahs Concept of Shariah (1979)
13. Ibn Taymiyyahs Attitude towards Sufism (1979)
14. Islamic Funeral Rites (1991)
15. Social Justice in Islam: A translation of Sayyid Qutbs al-adalatul ijtimaiyyah fi al-islam into Malayalam (4th edition, 1987)
16. Miscellaneous articles published in various newspapers/magazines

=== Courses taught ===
1. Evolution of Fiqh and Emergence of the Schools of Jurisprudence
2. Fiqh al-Hadith: A Study of Muwatta of Imam Malik
3. Readings in Sahih al-Bukhari
4. Islamic Ethics: Readings in Riyad al-Saliheen
5. Fiqh of Priorities
6. Fiqh of Minorities
7. Islamic Ethics and Morals in Light of the Qur’an
8. Studies in Islamic Spirituality based on Imam Ghazzalis Ihya ulum al-Ddeen
9. An analytical Study of Aqidah Tahawiyyah
10. Marriage and Family in Islam
11. Comparative Religions
12. Fiqh al-Zakah
13. Principles of Islamic Jurisprudence (Usul al-Fiqh)
14. A Thematic Study of Surah Yusuf

== Honors and awards ==
Kutty was considered one of The 500 Most Influential Muslims in the World.
