= Marakkara =

- Grama Panchayath
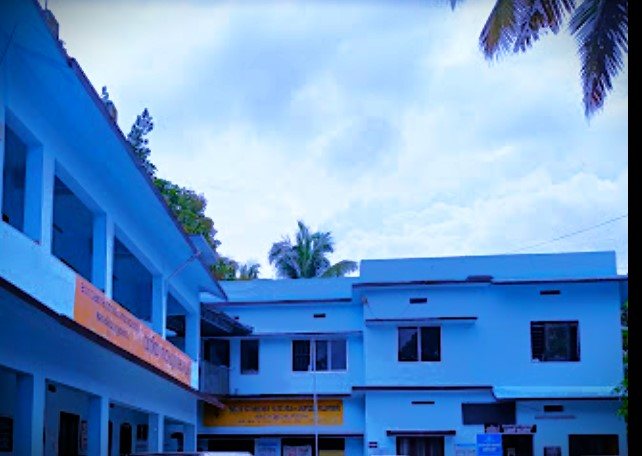
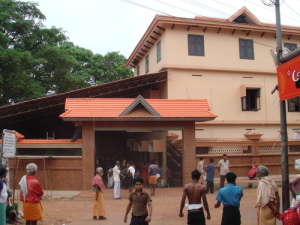
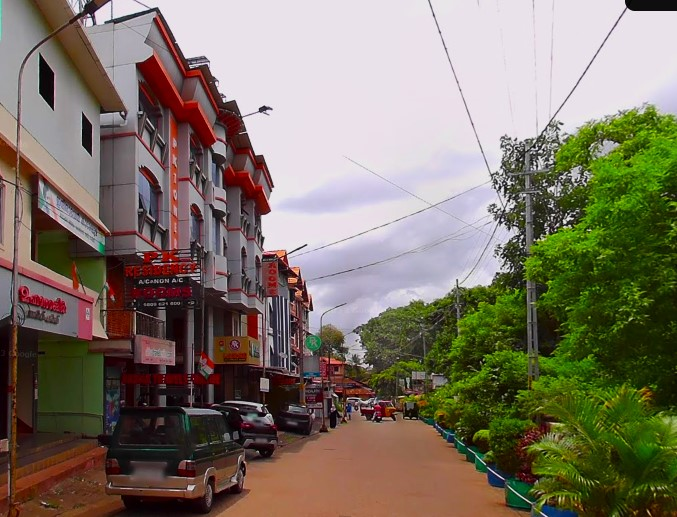
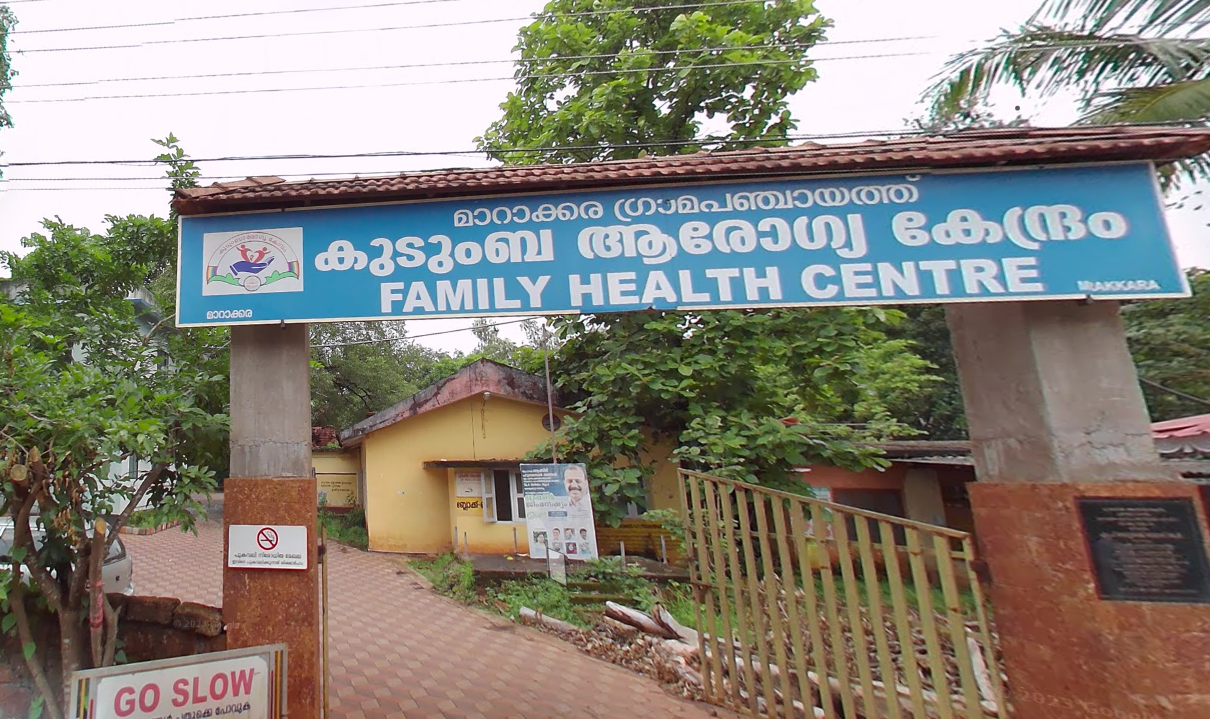

- Location in Kerala, India Marakkara (India)
- Coordinates: 10°57′0″N 76°2′0″E
- Country: India
- State: Kerala
- District: Malappuram
- Established: 1962

Government
  - Type: Grama Panchayath

Area
  - Total: 27.00 km^{2} (10.42 sq mi)
- Elevation: 127.0 m (416.7 ft)

Population (2011)
  - Total: 18,187
  - Density: 673.6/km^{2} (1,745/sq mi)

Languages
  - Official: Malayalam, English
- Time zone: UTC+5:30 (IST)
- PIN: 676553
- Vehicle registration: KL-55, KL-10

Marakkara is a Grama Panchayath in Kuttippuram Block Panchayat, Tirur Taluk, Malappuram district in the state of Kerala, India.

== Kadampuzha Temple ==
The famous Kadampuzha Devi Temple is situated inside the Marakkara panchayath.Kadampuzha Devi Temple is a Hindu temple and pilgrimage center at Kadampuzha in Malappuram district, Kerala, India. The main deity of this temple is Goddess Parvati/Durga in the form of a huntress. There is no idol of Goddess in this temple, and she is worshipped in a pit. The presence of Lord Ganesha is also believed to be with the Goddess, and there are sub-shrines for Lord Sastha and serpent deities. A separate Shiva temple exists near the temple, called 'Madambiyarkavu'. Both these temples are under the control of Malabar Devaswom Board.

== Transportation ==
Marakkara village connects to other parts of India through valanchery town. National highway No.66 passes through valanchery and the northern stretch connects to Goa and Mumbai. The southern stretch connects to Cochin and Trivandrum. State Highway No.28 starts from Nilambur and connects to Ooty, Mysore and Bangalore through Highways.12,29 and 181. National Highway No.966 connects to Palakkad and Coimbatore. The nearest airport is at Kozhikode. The nearest major railway station is at Tirur.

== Demographics ==
As of 2011 India census, Marakkara had a population of 18,187, with 8,362 males and 9,825 females.

== Administration ==
Marakkara is a Grama Panchayath, divided into 24 wards.

== Villages ==
No.	Name
1	Marakkara
2	Melmuri

== Wards (As per 2010) ==
Ward no.	Name
1	Randathani
2	Marakkara
3	Erkkara
4	Maruthinchira
5	Melmuri
6	Parappur
7	Karekkad North
8	Chithrampally
9	Majeedkundu
10	Jarathingal
11	Malayil
12	Neeradi
13	Pilathara
14	Kadampuzha
15	Chullikkad
16	A.C.nirapp
17	Kallarmangalam
18	Chelakuth
19	Poovanchina
20	Attuppuram

== Wards (As per 2025) ==
Ward Number	Name of the ward
01	Parammal
02	Keezhmuri
03	Erkkara
04	Maruthinchira
05	Melmuri
06	Parappur
07	Karekkad
08	Karuvanchery
09	Chithrampalli
10	Moolanchola
11	Malayil
12	Pangooth
13	Jarathingal
14	Chullikkadu
15	A. C. Nirappu
16	Kadampuzha
17	Neeradi
18	Pilathara
19	Muzhangani
20	Kallarmangalam
21	Chelakkuth
22	Cheruparamb
23	Poovanchina
24	Randathani

== Election results ==
=== Panchayath Election 2025 ===
Marakkara panchayath Election 2025.

S.No.	Party name	Party symbol	Number of Members
01	UDF		18
02	LDF		06

=== Panchayath election 2020 ===
Marakkara panchayath Election 2020

S.No.	Party name	Party symbol	Number of Members
01	UDF		15
02	Independents		03
03	LDF		02

=== Panchayath election 2015 ===
Marakkara panchayath Election 2015

S.No.	Party name	Party symbol	Number of Members
01	Independents		12
02	UDF		8
03	LDF		0

=== Panchayath election 2010 ===
Marakkara panchayath Election 2015

S.No.	Party name	Party symbol	Number of Members
01	UDF		16
02	Independents		02
03	LDF		02

=== Panchayath election 2005 ===
Marakkara panchayath Election 2005

S.No.	Party name	Party symbol	Number of Members
01	UDF		09
02	Independents		10
03	LDF		00

== Marakkara Panchayat ==
- Panchayat president: T P Sajna Teacher [Indian Union Muslim league]
- Vice President: Umarali Karekkad [Indian National Congress]

== See also ==
- Valanchery
- Edayoor
