= Irimbiliyam =

Irimbilayam Valiyakunnu
- Census town
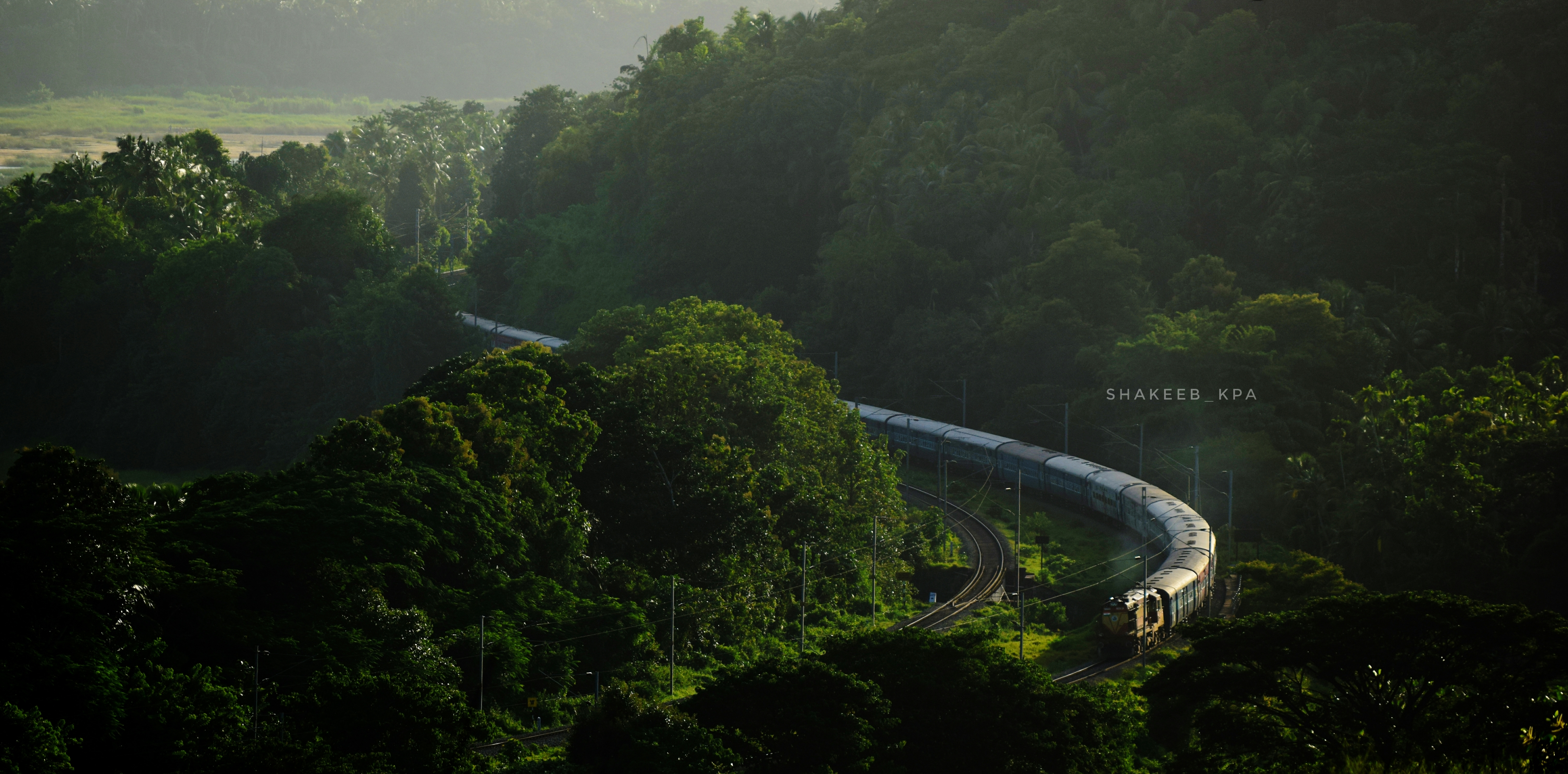
- Mankeri hill, Irimbiliyam

- Location in Kerala, India Irimbilayam (India)
- Coordinates: 10°52′0″N 76°5′0″E
- Country: India
- State: Kerala
- District: Malappuram

Population (2011)
  - Total: 30,635

Languages
  - Official: Malayalam, English
- Time zone: UTC+5:30 (IST)
- PIN: 679572
- Vehicle registration: KL-
- Nearest city: Malappuram

Irimbiliyam is a census town near valanchery in Malappuram district in the state of Kerala, India. There are many small villages like Mankery, Angadi, Thirunilam, Kalarikkal, Shapumpadi, and Palli Padi.

== Demographics ==
As of 2011 India census, Irimbiliyam had a population of 30635 with 14557 males and 16078 females.

== Transportation ==
Irimbiliyam village connects to other parts of India through valanchery town. National highway No.66 passes through valanchery and the northern stretch connects to Goa and Mumbai. The southern stretch connects to Cochin and Trivandrum. National Highway No.966 connects to Palakkad and Coimbatore. The nearest airport is at Kozhikode and the nearest major railway station is at Kuttippuram and Pallipuram.
