= Kuttippuram =

- Town
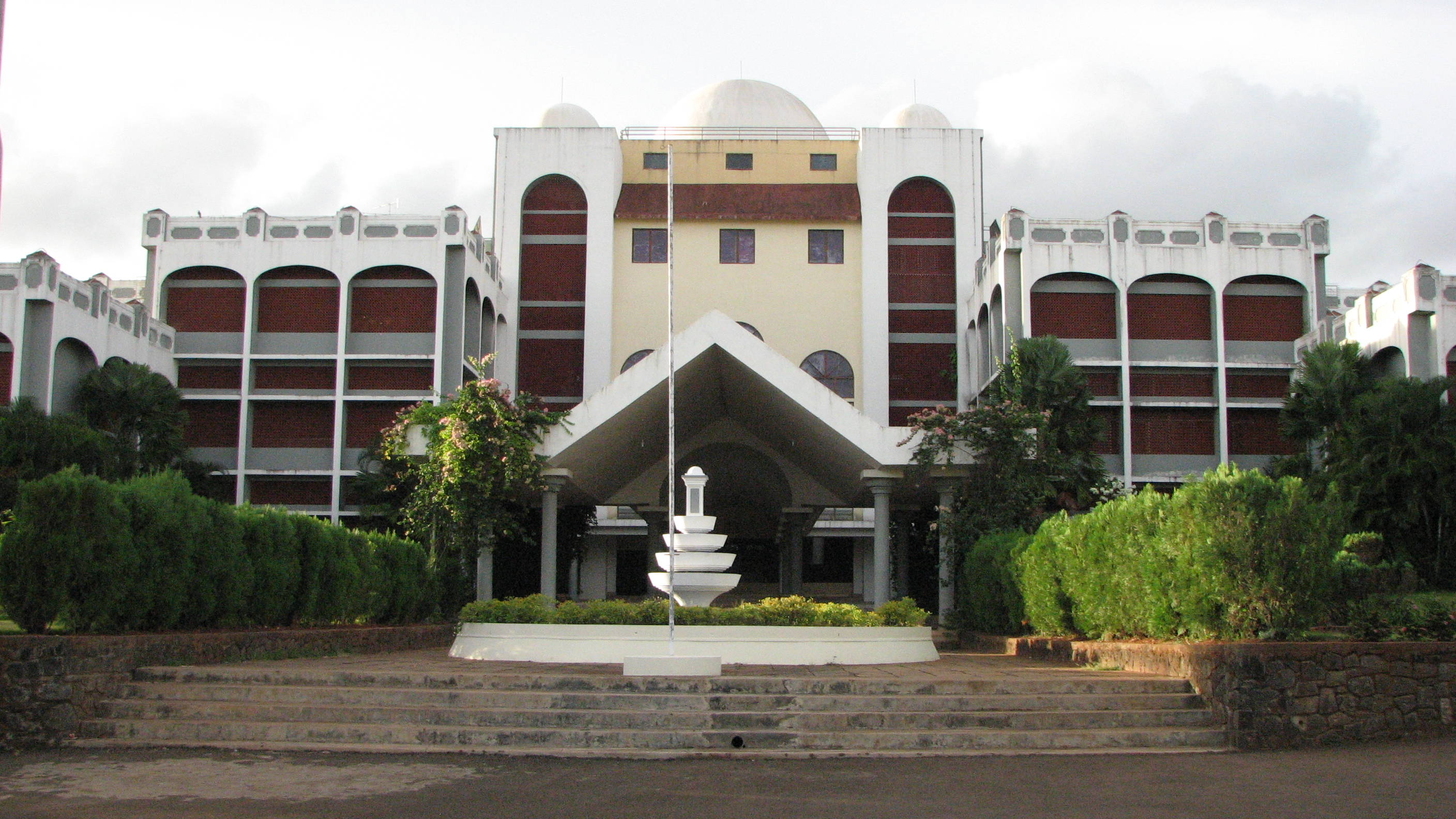
- MES College of Engineering, Kuttippuram

- Location in Kerala, India Kuttippuram (India)
- Coordinates: 10°50′38″N 76°01′58″E
- Country: India
- State: Kerala
- District: Malappuram

Languages
  - Official: Malayalam, English
- Time zone: UTC+5:30 (IST)

Kuttippuram is a town and a block headquarters, situated in the Tirur Taluk, Malappuram district of Kerala state, India. The town is located 34 kilometres south-west of Malappuram and 8 kilometres west of Valanchery. The Bharathappuzha river flows through Kuttippuram. According to the last Census of India conducted in 2011, Kuttippuram forms a part of the Malappuram metropolitan area.

== History ==
Kuttippuram, on the northern bank of the river Bharathappuzha, was ruled by the Zamorin of Calicut during the middle ages. Kuttippuram railway station is one of the oldest railway stations in Kerala. The second railway line in Kerala was laid from Tirur to Kuttippuram in 1861, as an extension of the first line laid from Tirur to Beypore in the same year. In the 1940s, several national leaders including C. Rajagopalachari, M. Bhaktavatsalam, and Yakkob Hassan visited Kuttippuram. Fakhruddin Ali Ahmed, a former president of India, has also visited here. The ashes of Mahatma Gandhi, Jawaharlal Nehru, and Lal Bahadur Shastri, were deposited in Kerala between Tirunavaya, Kuttippuram, and Thavanur, on the bank of the river Bharathappuzha.

The Kuttippuram bridge, built in 1953, is one of the famous bridges in Kerala. The poem Kuttippuram Palam, describing the beauty of Bharathappuzha River at the sandy riverbank of Kuttippuram, was written by the poet Edasseri Govindan Nair. Kuttippuram was also a constituency of the Kerala Legislative Assembly from 1957 to 2011, which was then replaced by the Kottakkal constituency.

Tirunavaya, the centre of medieval Mamankam festival, and Athavanad, which was the centre of Azhvanchery Thamprakkal, lie adjacent to Kuttippuram.

== Geography ==
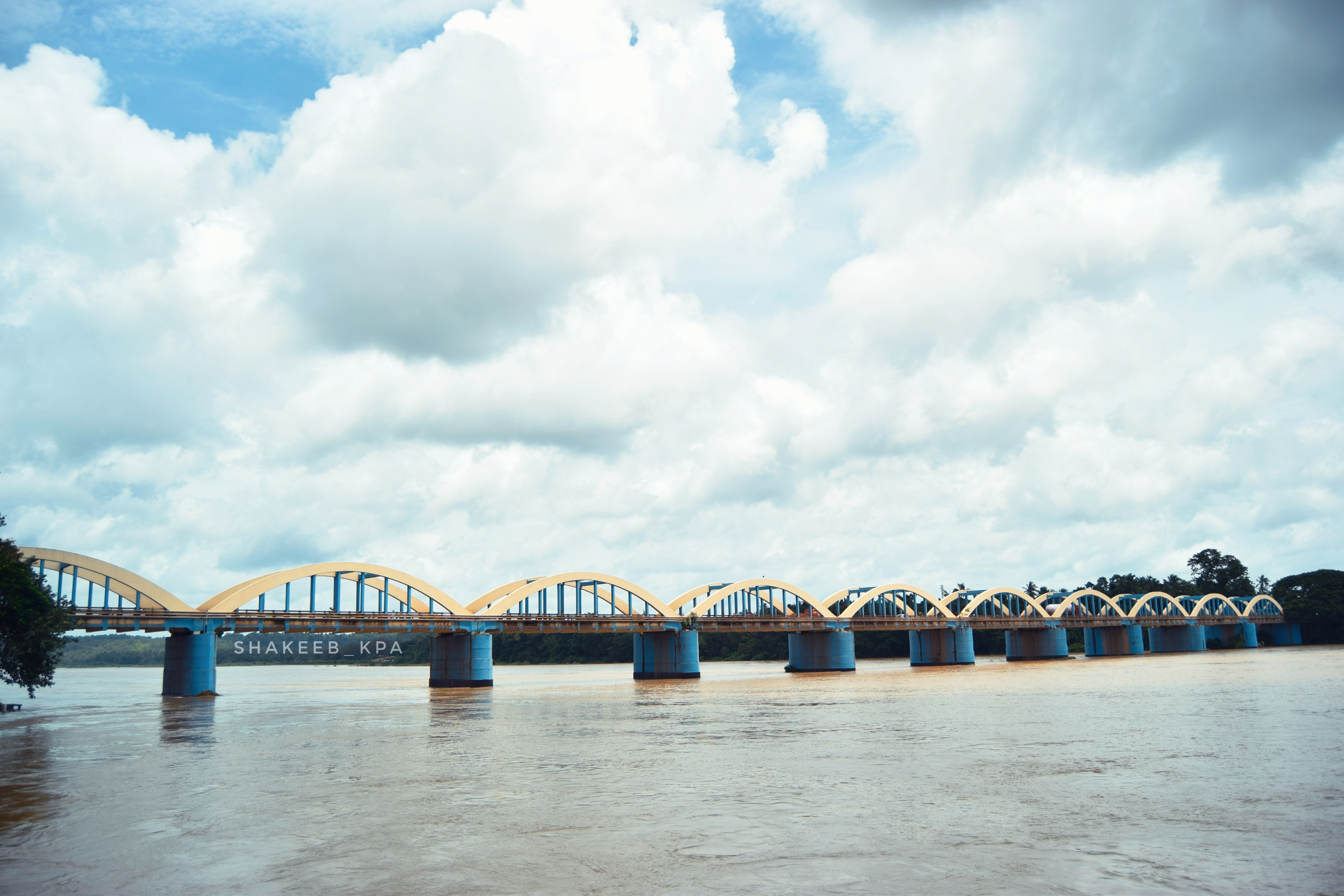
Kuttippuram bridge

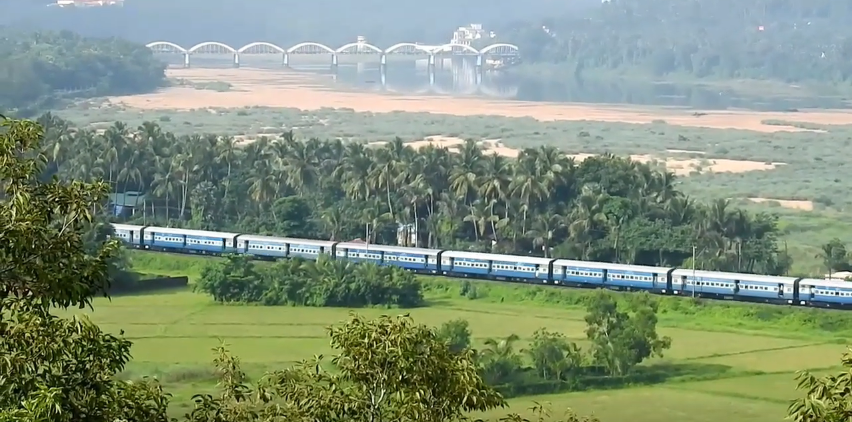
Railway line in Kuttippuram

Kuttippuram is located at 10.83°N 76.07°E. It has an average elevation of 15 m (49 ft).

== Industries ==
Kuttippuram is home to some of the major public sector industries in the state. The municipal town of Valanchery is situated adjacent to Kuttippuram Grama Panchayat. There is a demand to upgrade Kuttippuram Grama Panchayat into a municipality.

- The Kerala State Detergents and Chemicals Ltd. has its headquarters at Kuttippuram.
- The KELTRON (Kerala State Electronics Development Corporation) Electro Ceramics (KELCERA) is located here.
- A KELTRON tool room is also located here.

== Connectivity ==
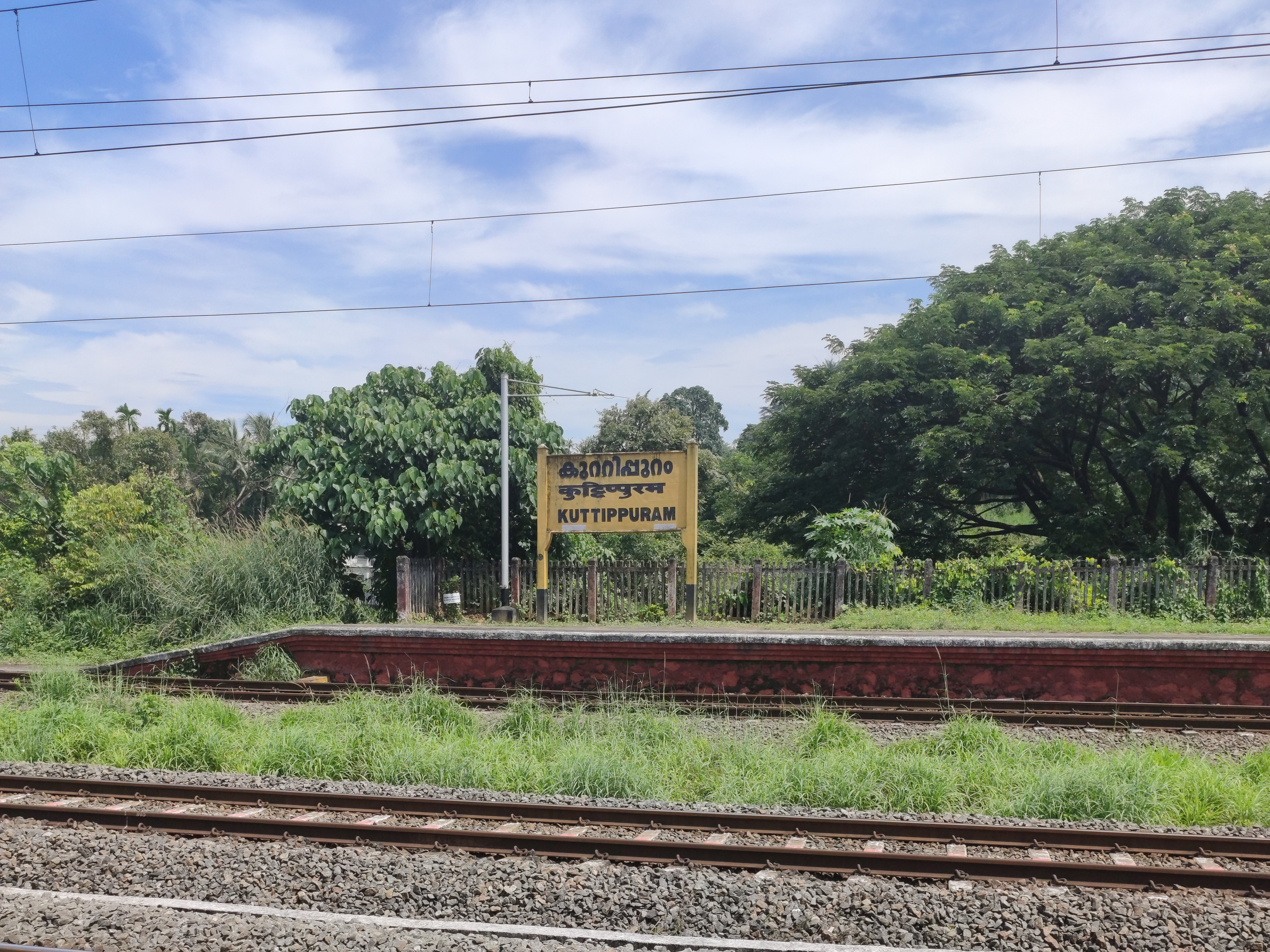
Kuttippuram railway station, opened in 1861, one of the oldest railway stations in the state

- Railway Station: Kuttippuram is home to two railway stations, Kuttippuram railway station opened in 1861, which is also one of the oldest stations in the state, and a minor railway station - Perassannur railway station. The nearest major railway station at Tirur is just 18 kilometres (11 mi) away from the town where almost every train stops.
- Road: Kuttippuram is well connected to the other cities by road; National Highway-66 passes through the town. NH-66 connects Kuttippuram with the cities of Kozhikode and Kochi. The SH 69 (Thrissur-Kuttippuram State Highway) connects Kuttippuram with Thrissur city. The Kuttippuram bridge is one of the famous bridges in Kerala, which was built in 1953, to connect Kozhikode with Kochi through National Highway-66. There are regular buses plying to other cities including Malappuram, Kozhikode, Kochi, Thrissur, and Coimbatore. There are a few private buses offering overnight journeys to Bangalore, Trivandrum, and Coimbatore.
- Nearest Airport: The Karipur International Airport is approximately 50 kilometres (31 mi) away.

== Kuttippuram Block ==
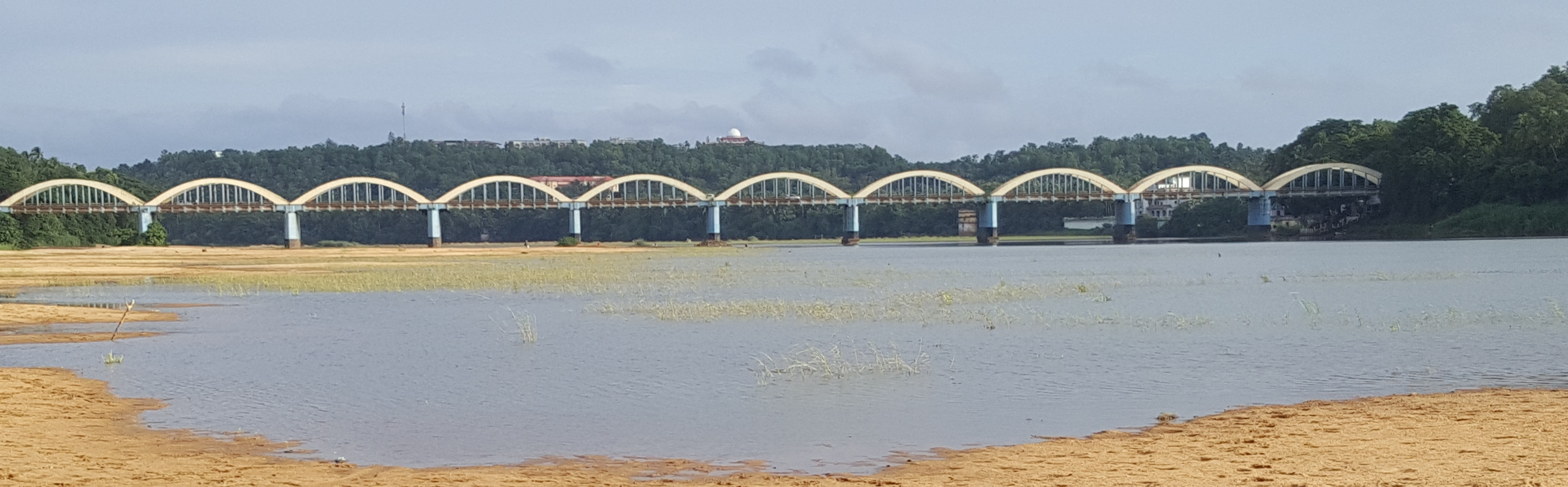
A panoramic view of Kuttippuram bridge from Nilayoram Park

Kuttippuram Block Panchayat is the block-level administrative body responsible for the administration of the following Gram panchayats:

1. Kuttippuram
2. Edayur
3. Irimbiliyam
4. Marakkara
5. Athavanad
6. Kalpakanchery

Valanchery municipality shares its boundary with Kuttippuram town, which was a Gram panchayat in Kuttippuram block until 2015.

== Notable people ==
- Edasseri Govindan Nair - poet
- Iqbal Kuttippuram - screenwriter
- M. T. Vasudevan Nair - Malayalam writer

== See also ==
- Anakkara
- Edayoor
- Kumbidi
- Triprangode
- Vairankode Vela
