= Kuttippuram bridge =

Kuttippuram Bridge
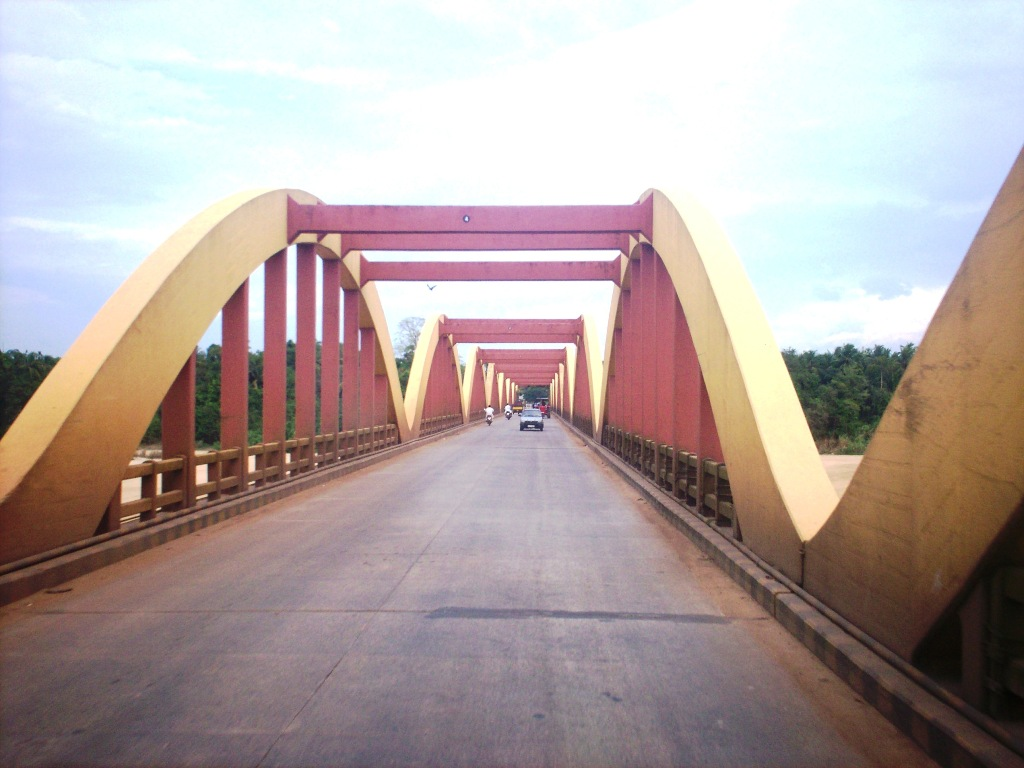
- Coordinates: 10.8404472°N 76.0234192°E
- Carries: Road
- Crosses: Bharathappuzha River
- Locale: Kuttippuram, Malappuram

Characteristics
- Material: Concrete
- Total length: 370 m (1,210 ft)

History
- Inaugurated: November 11, 1953

The Kuttippuram Bridge is a bridge that was built in 1953 that connects Kuttippuram with the Thavanur-Ponnani region in Malappuram district, Kerala, India. The Tirur and the Ponnani Taluks are separated by the river Bharathappuzha, which is also the second-longest river in Kerala. The bridge connects these two regions. It is a part of the National Highway 66 on the Kozhikode - Kochi route. It is one of the largest and oldest bridges built over the river Bharathappuzha, and plays a major role in connecting the Malabar region with the erstwhile Travancore-Cochin via road.

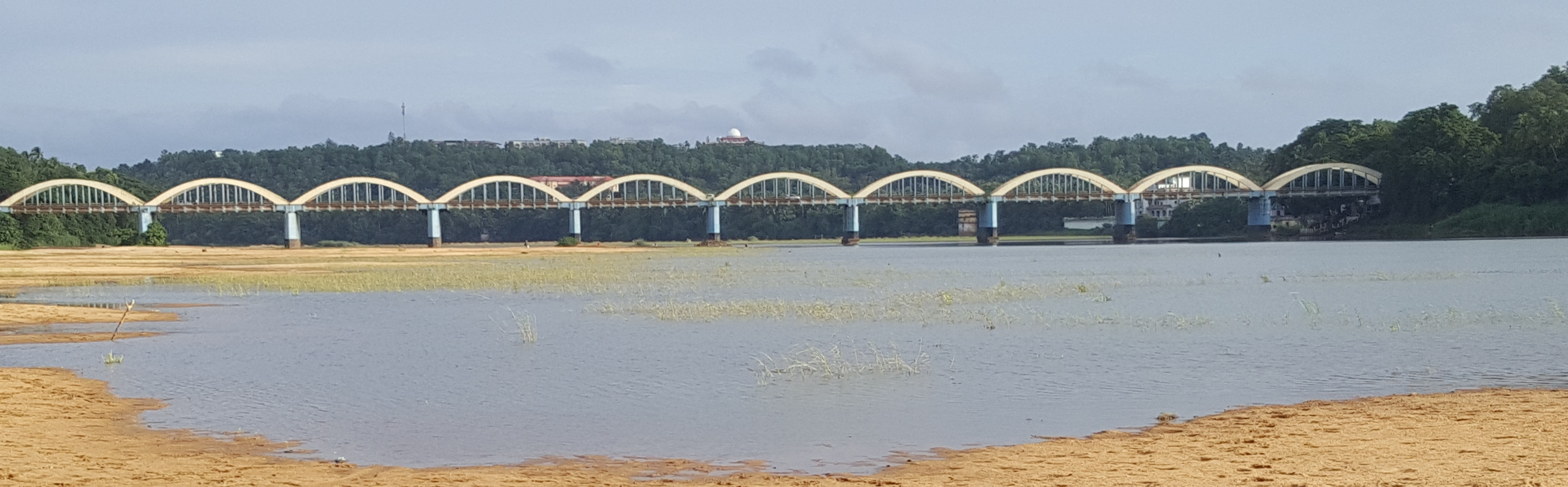
A panoramic view of Kuttippuram bridge from Nilayoram Park

== History ==
Before the construction of the bridge, Kozhikode and Kochi were connected via Shornur. A bridge over the river Bharathappuzha through Kuttippuram became necessary for the construction of National Highway 66 to connect Kozhikode with Kochi. On May 8, 1949, M. Bhaktavatsalam, the then Minister of Public Works of the Government of Madras, laid the foundation stone for the bridge. The Modern Housing Construction and Properties (MHCP) Ltd. based at Chennai was chosen for the construction. The bridge was inaugurated on November 11, 1953, by Shanmugha Rajeswara Sethupathi, who was the Minister of Public Works in Madras at the time. The main architect of the bridge was K. V. Abdul Azeez from Ponnani. The chief engineer for the construction was W. H. Nambiar and the Superintendent engineer was P. T. Narayanan Nair.

== Kuttippuram Palam ==
The popular Malayalam poem, Kuttippuram Palam, written by Edasseri Govindan Nair, published on February 21, 1954, through the magazine Mathrubhumi Azhchappathippu, describes Kuttippuram bridge and the state of the river Bharathappuzha.

== See also ==
- Chamravattom Regulator-cum-Bridge
- Kuttippuram railway station
- Mini Pampa, Malappuram
- Tavanur
