= Kuruva, Malappuram =

Village in Kerala, India

Kuruva
- Village
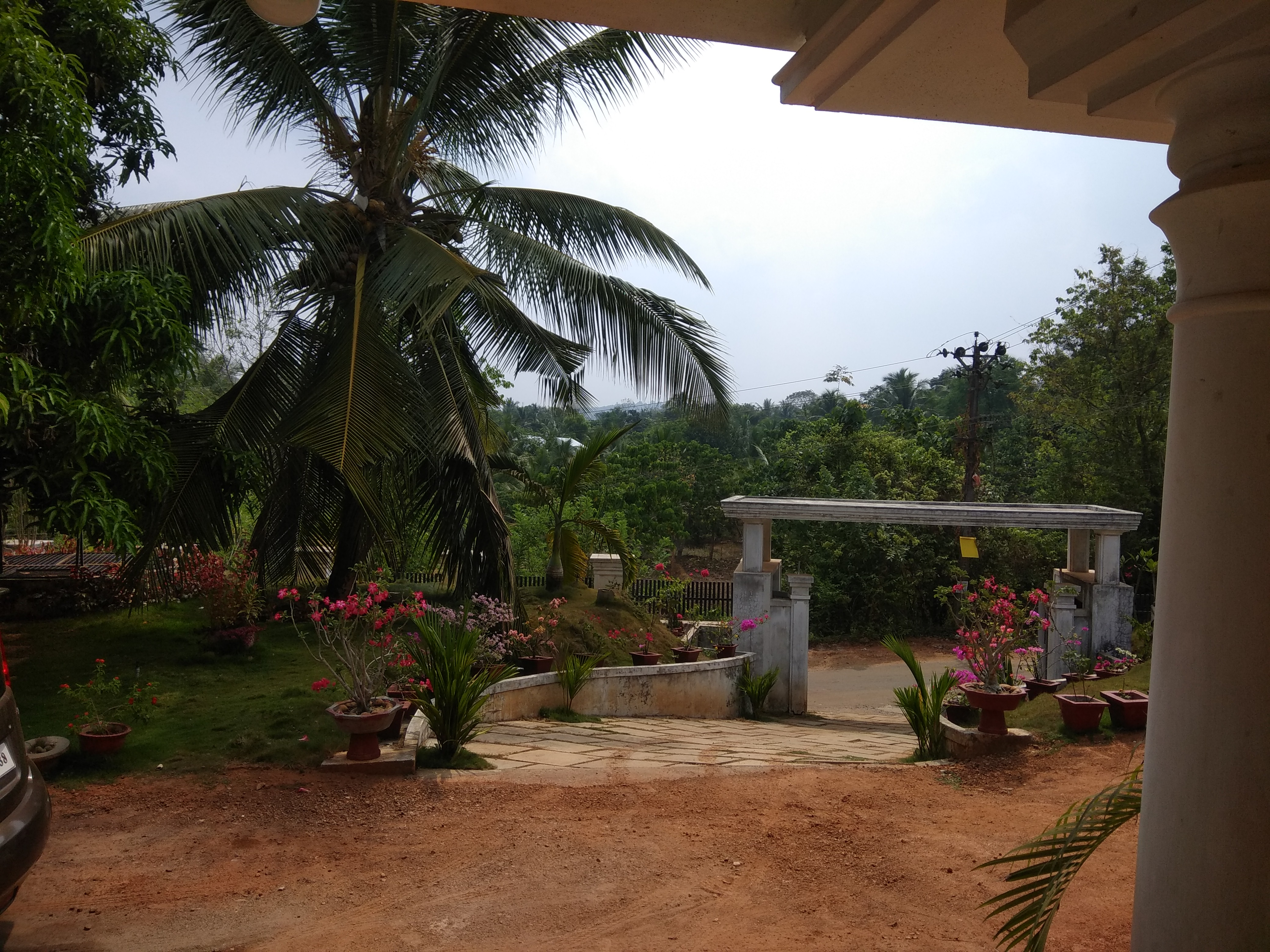
- A countryside near Pang Town in Kuruva

- Location within Kerala Location within India
- Coordinates: 11°00′57″N 76°06′47″E
- Country: India
- State: Kerala
- District: Malappuram
- Taluk: Perinthalmanna

Government
  - Type: Gram Panchayat

Area
  - Total: 31.02 km^{2} (11.98 sq mi)
- Elevation: 52 m (171 ft)

Population (2011)
  - Total: 38,153
  - Density: 1,230/km^{2} (3,186/sq mi)

Languages
  - Official: Malayalam
- Time zone: UTC+5:30 (IST)
- PIN: 679338
- STD code: 04933
- Vehicle registration: KL-53

Kuruva is a village in Perinthalmanna Taluk, Malappuram District, Kerala, India. It is located along the National Highway 966, about 6 kilometres southeast of the district seat Malappuram, and 13 kilometres northwest of the taluk seat Perinthalmanna. As of the 2011 India Census, the population was 38,153.

== Demographics ==
In the 2011 census, Kuruva had a total of 7,233 households. The gender composition was 47.84% male and 52.16% female. The literacy rate was 79.70%, with 80.69% of the male population and 78.80% of the female population being literate.

== Kuruva Gram panchayat ==
Kuruva Grama Panchayat is a local governing body in Malappuram district of Kerala state, India. The local governing body has 22 wards. The Panchayat office is located at Padapparamba town.

=== Wards ===
List of wards in Kuruva Grama Panchayath

| Number | Name |
|---|---|
| 1 | Mullappalli |
| 2 | Kuruva |
| 3 | Samoosappadi |
| 4 | Vattalloor |
| 5 | Nechikkuthparamba |
| 6 | Karinjapadi |
| 7 | Padapparamba |
| 8 | Kizhakkan Pang |
| 9 | Thora |
| 10 | Thekkan Pang |
| 11 | Pookkode |
| 12 | Ambalapparambu |
| 13 | Chendi |
| 14 | Padinhattumuri |
| 15 | Chandanapparamba |
| 16 | Chandapparamba |
| 17 | Cherukulamba |
| 18 | Cherukulamba West |
| 19 | Mekkulamba |
| 20 | Thekkumkulamba |
| 21 | Pazhamalloor |
| 22 | Meenarkuzhi |
