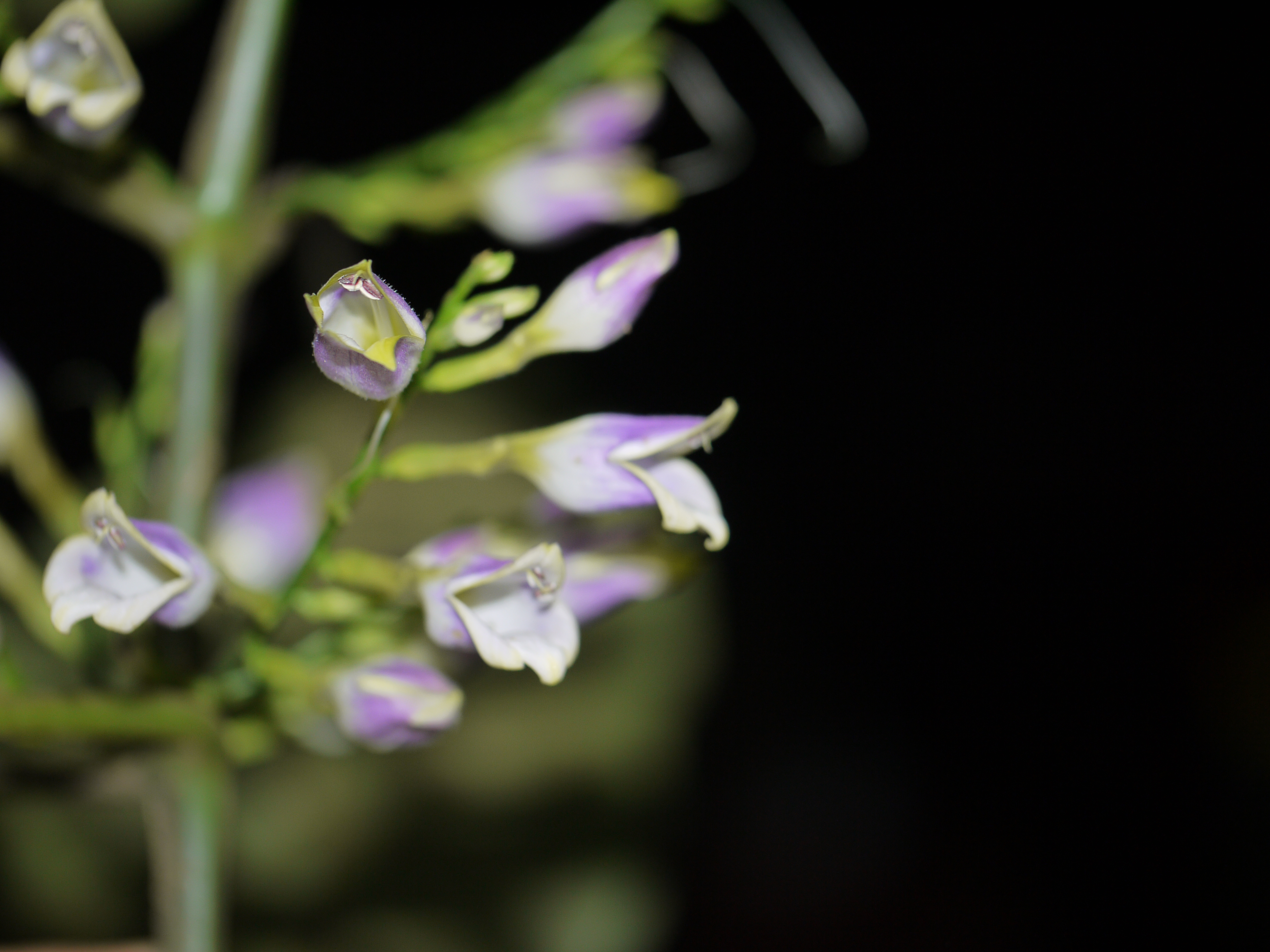

Scientific classification
- Kingdom: Plantae
- Clade: Tracheophytes
- Clade: Angiosperms
- Clade: Eudicots
- Clade: Asterids
- Order: Lamiales
- Family: Acanthaceae
- Genus: Gymnostachyum
- Species: G. warrieranum

Binomial name
- Gymnostachyum warrieranum K.M.P.Kumar, Balach. & V.B.Sreek.

= Gymnostachyum warrieranum =

Species of flowering plant

Gymnostachyum warrieranum is a small plant endemic to Western Ghats in India. The plant would grow up to 70 cm and flower between November and March.

Gymnostachyum warrieranum has purplish flowers and found in altitudes of 1,500 feet (457 m) above sea level.

The species was named after the Kottakkal Arya Vaidya Sala managing trustee and chief physician P. K. Warrier.

== Gallery ==
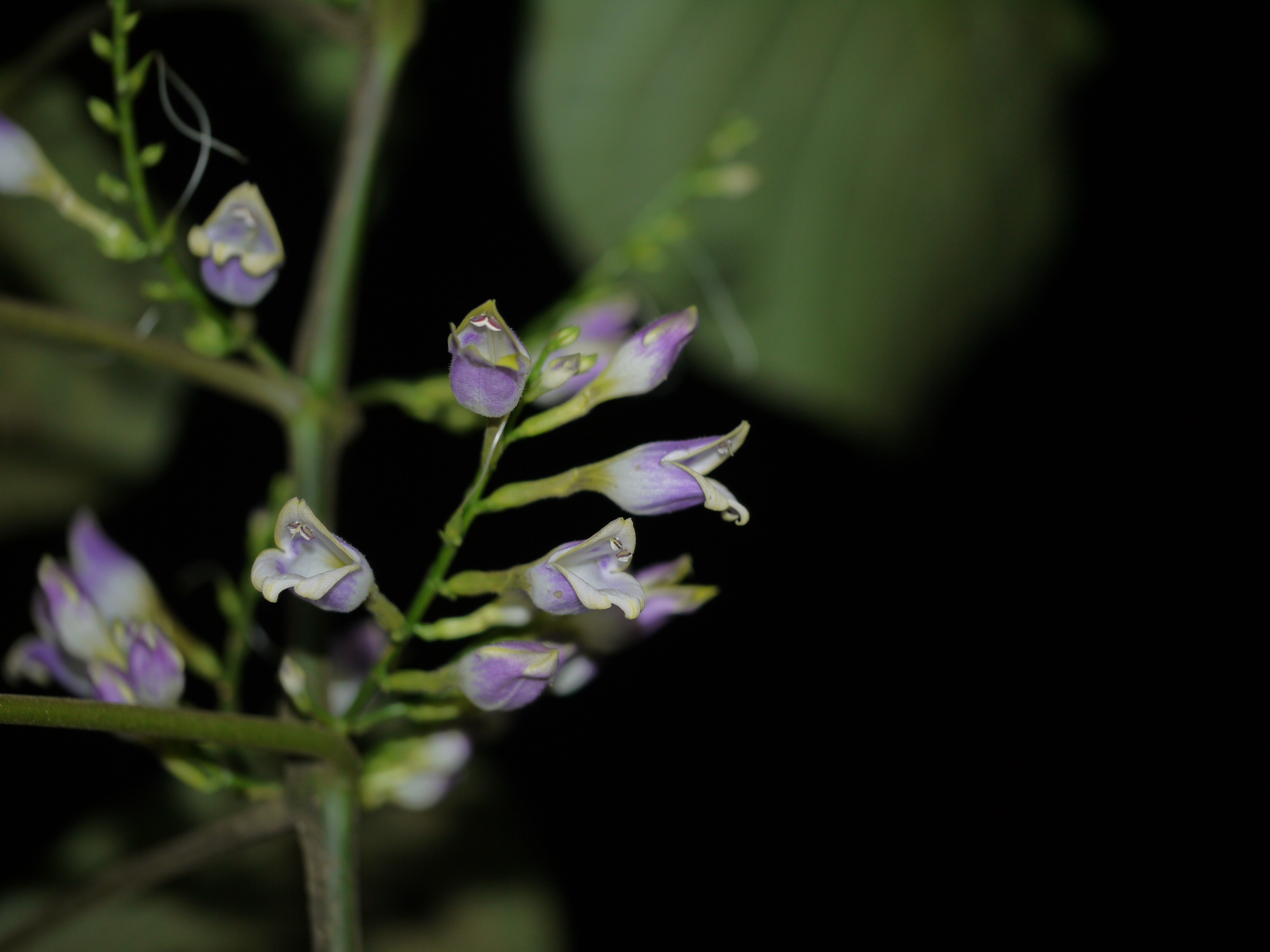

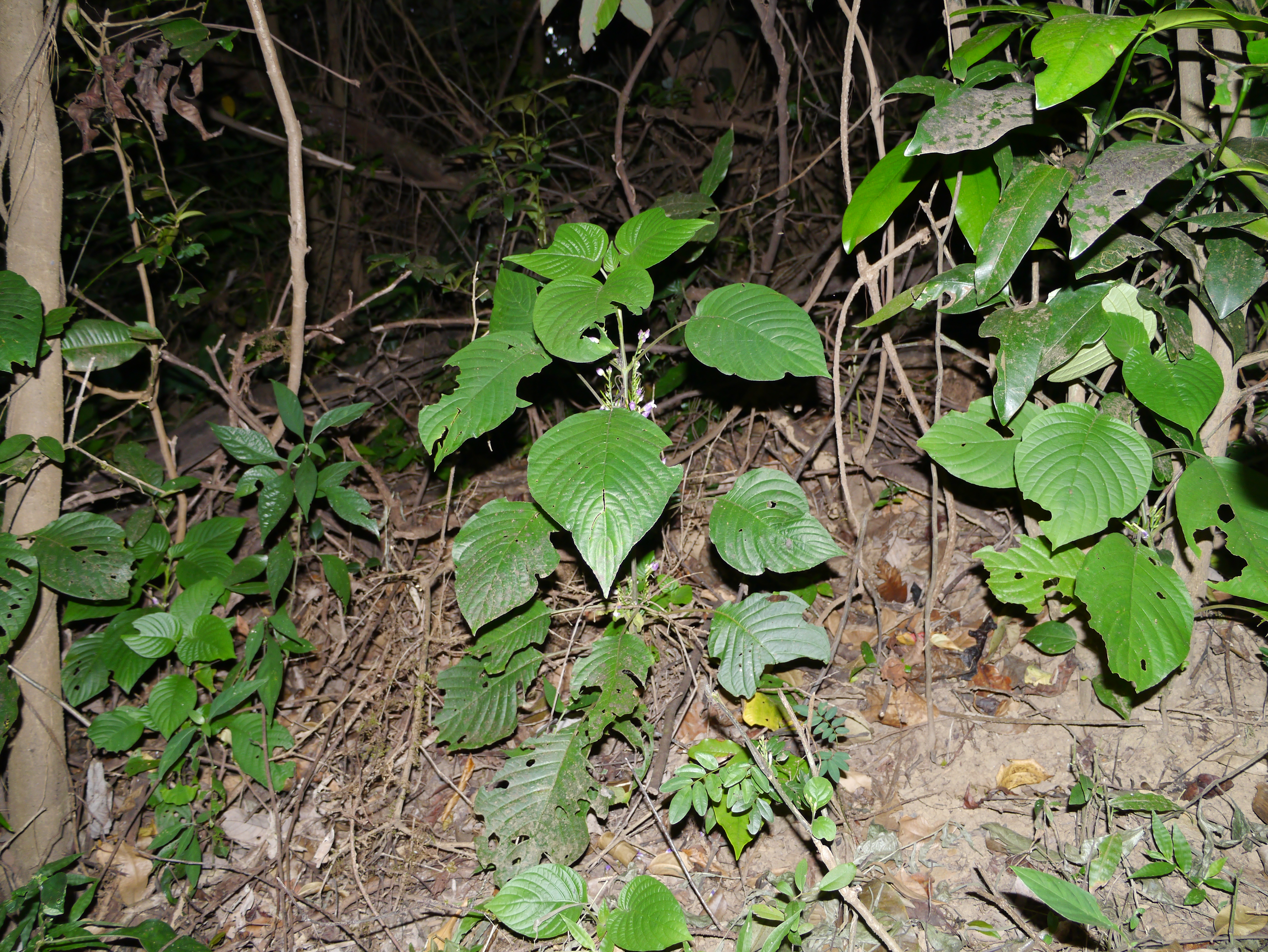

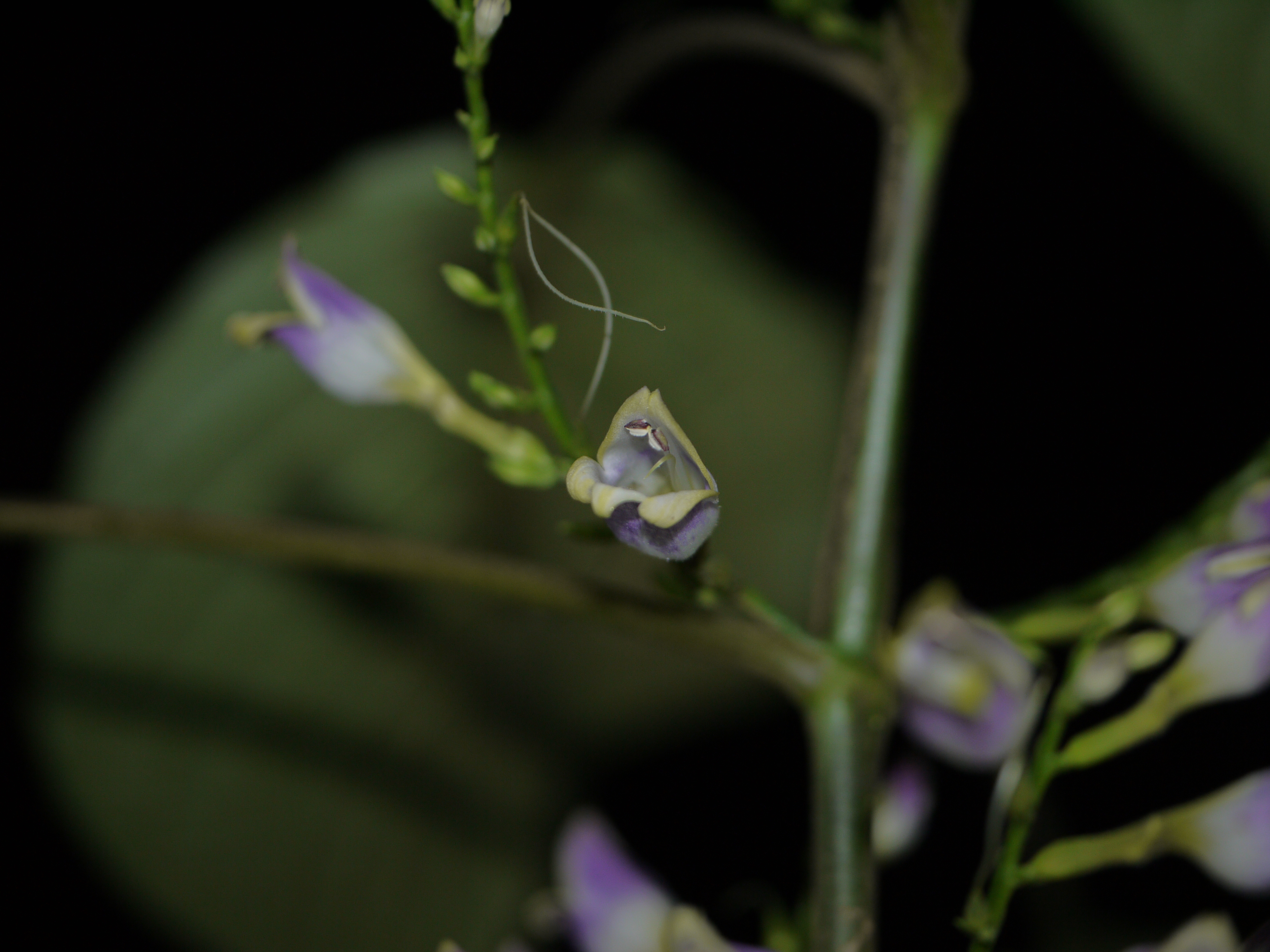

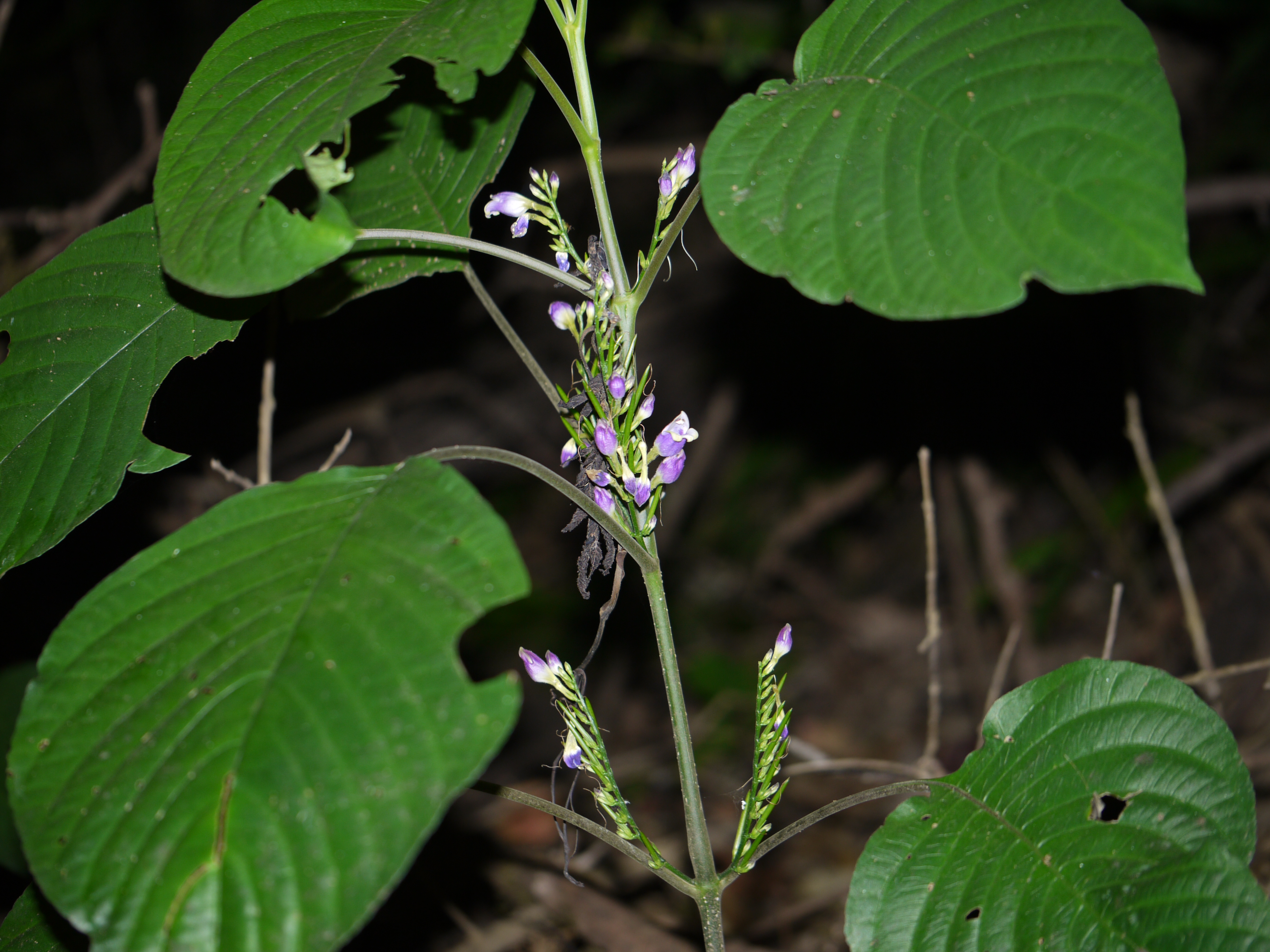

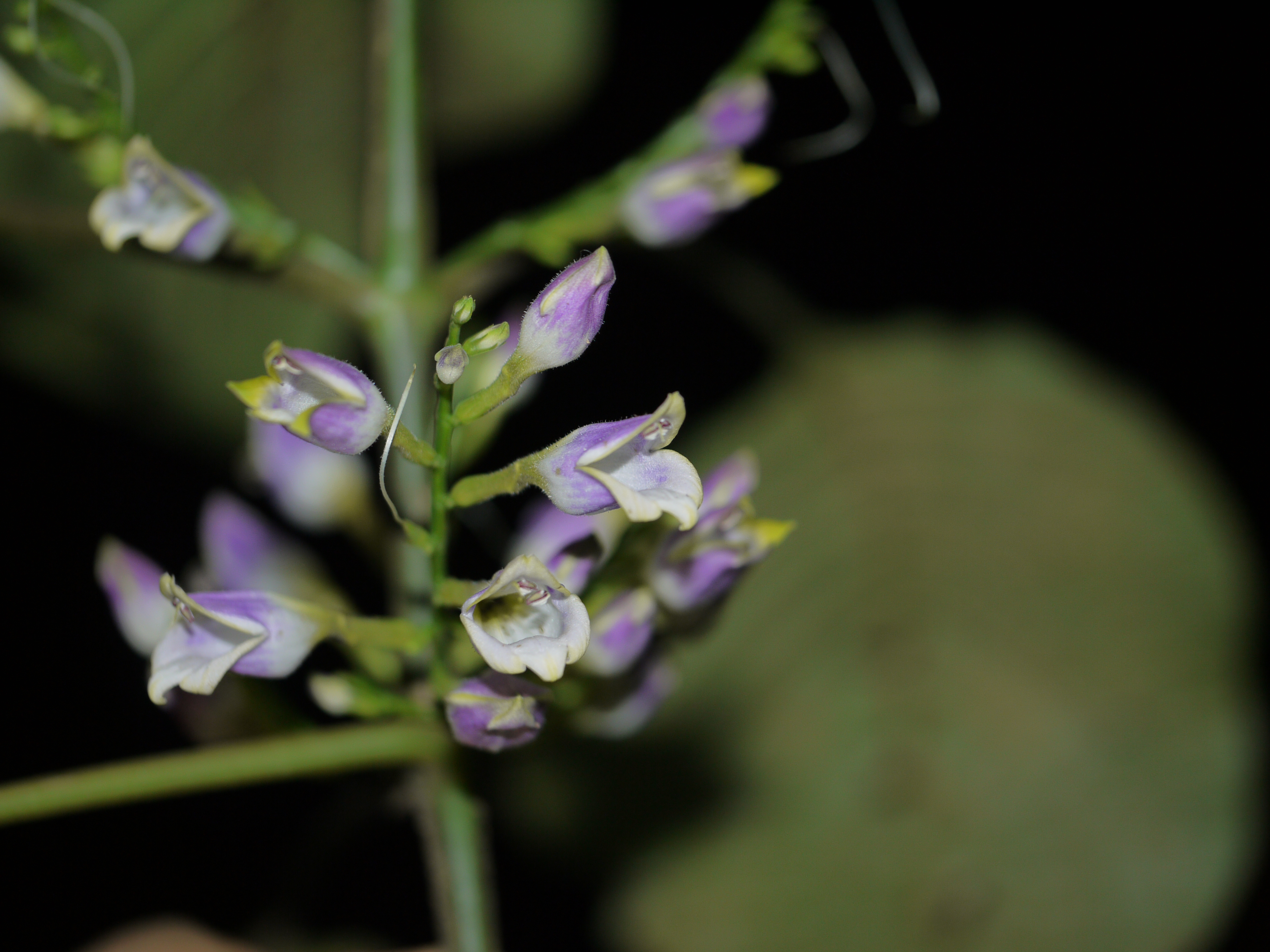

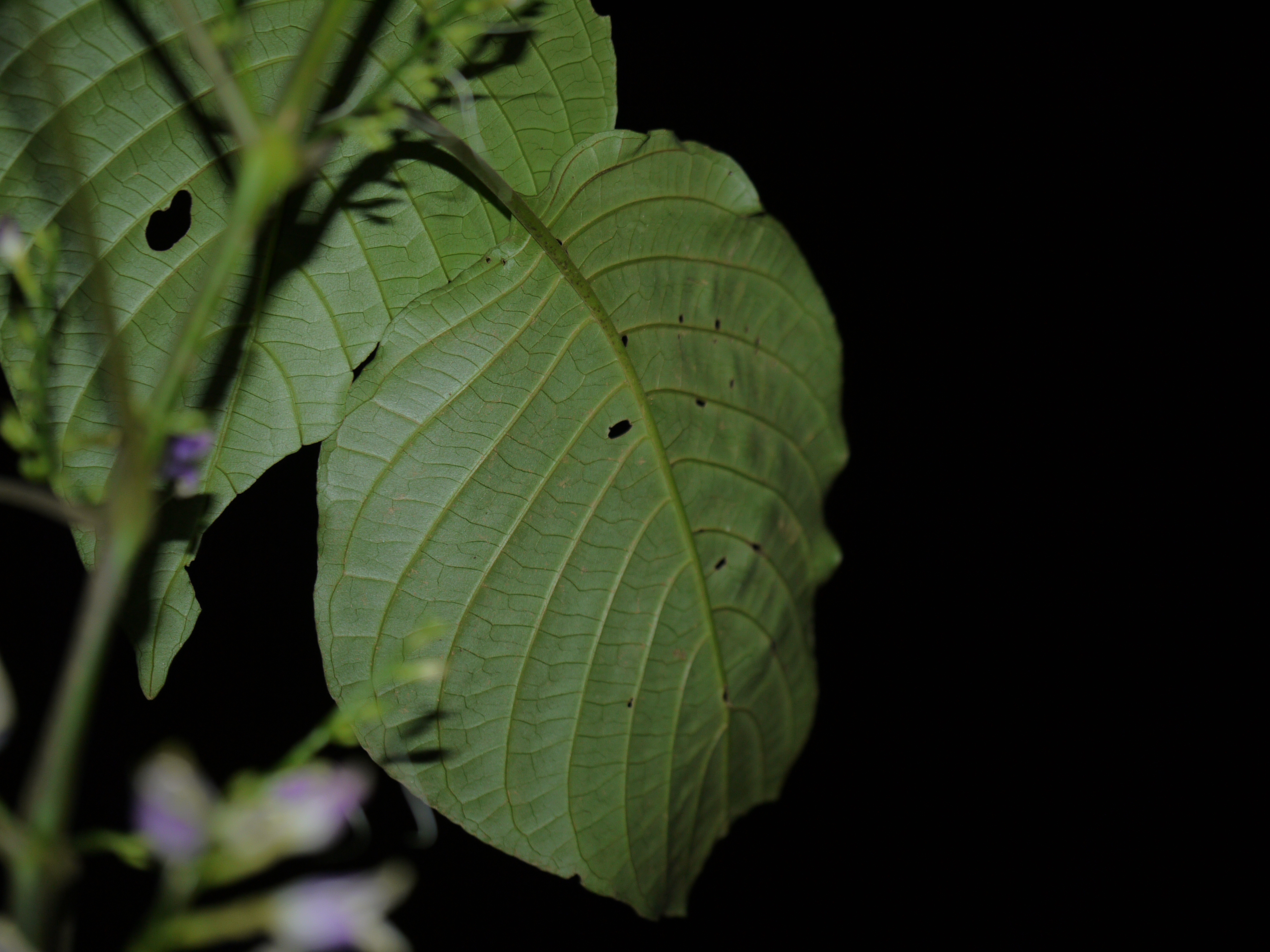

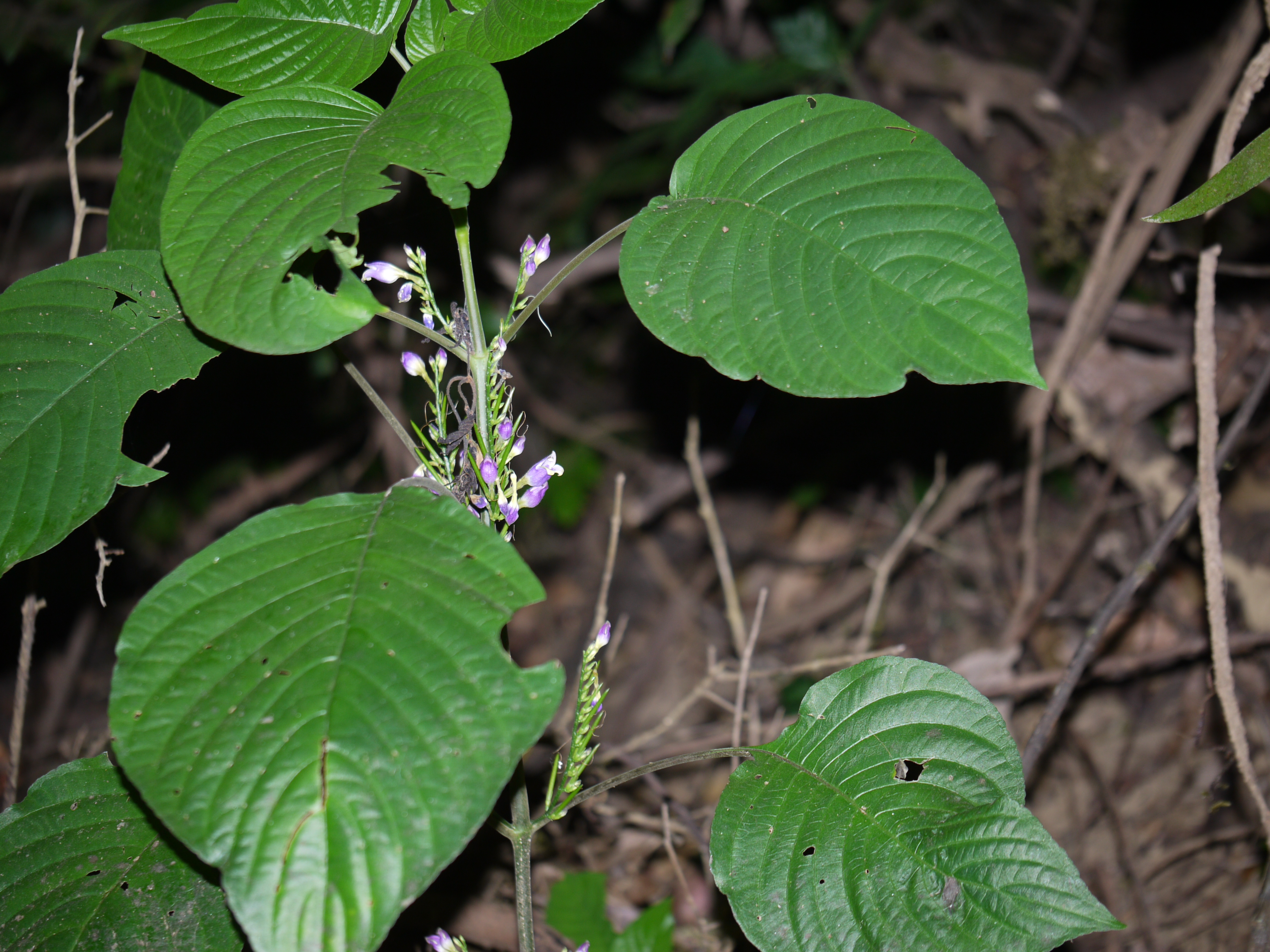

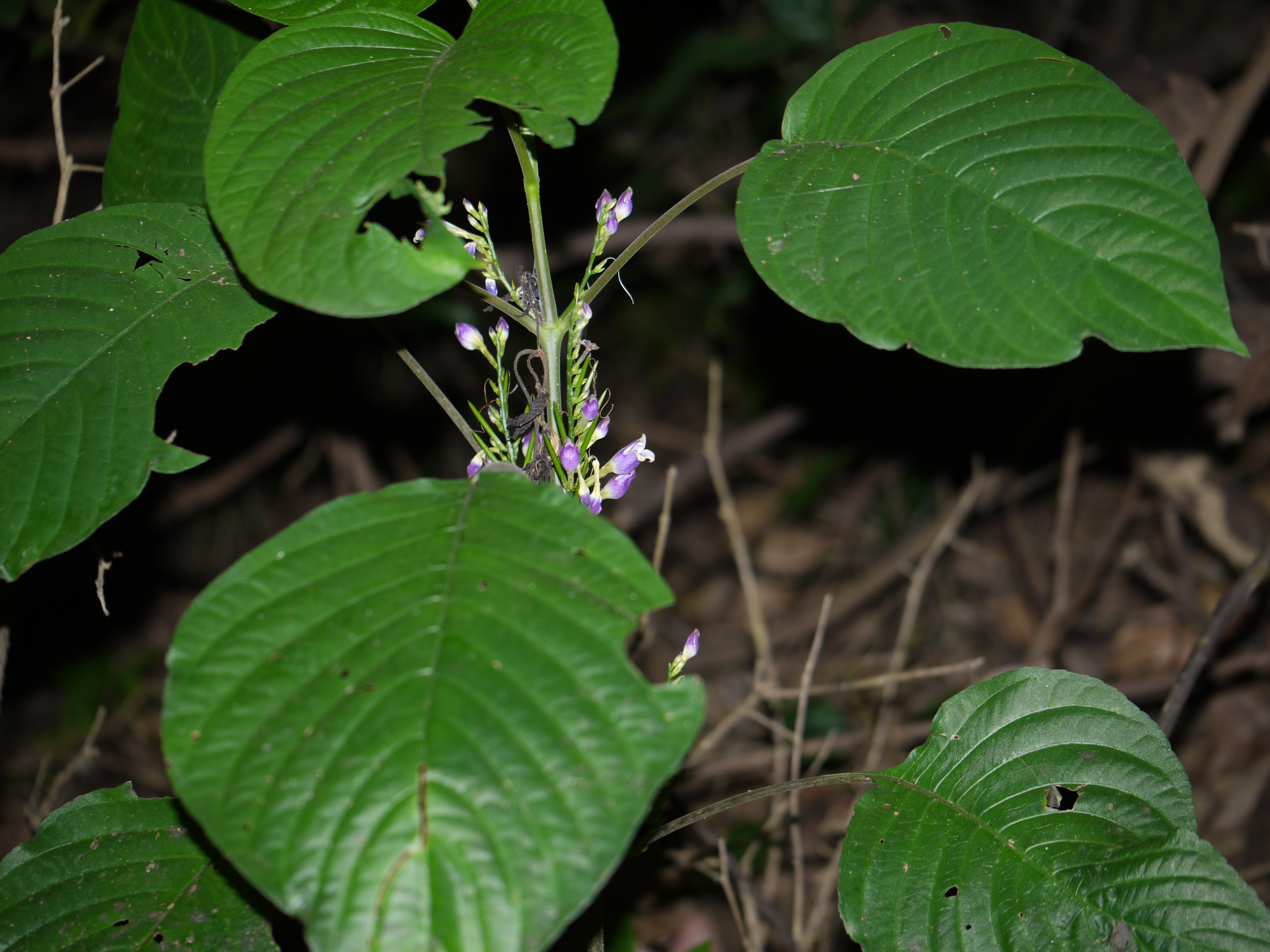
