= Kottakkal Municipality =

Local civic body in Malappuram, Kerala, India

Type
- Type: Municipality of Kottakkal
- Term limits: None

History
- Founded: 2010

Leadership
- Chairperson: K.K. Nasar, IUML
- Vice Chairman: Paroli Ramla Teacher, IUML

Structure
- Seats: 35
- Political groups: UDF: 25 seats; LDF: 5 seats; Independent: 3 seats; NDA: 2 seats
- Committees: Finance Standing Committee; Development Standing Committee; Welfare Standing Committee; Health Standing Committee; Public Works Standing Committee; Town Planning Standing Committee; Tax Appeal Standing Committee; Education & Sports Standing Committee
- Length of term: 5 years

Elections
- Voting system: First-past-the-post
- Last election: 2025
- Next election: 2030

Meeting place
- Municipality office, Kottakkal

Website
- kottakkalmunicipality.lsgkerala.gov.in/en

Kottakkal Municipality is the Municipality that administers the city of Kottakkal in Malappuram district, Kerala. Established in 2010, it is in the Malappuram Lok Sabha constituency & Kottakkal Assembly constituency. The first chairperson was T.V. Sulaikhabi. Its one assembly constituencies are Kottakkal Assembly constituency, of the city of Kottakkal, with a population of about 44,382 within that area. Kottakkal Municipality has been formed with functions to improve the infrastructure of town. On November 1, 2010, Kottakkal was elevated as a municipality.

== Divisions ==
Kottakkal Municipality is divided into 32 wards for ease of administration from which a member is elected from each for a duration of five years.

Wards of Kottakkal Municipality
Ward No.	Ward Name	Ward No.	Ward Name
1	Changuvetty	2	Chuda
3	Kottakkal Town	4	Kottakkal Thaze Angadi
5	Palappura	6	Mythri Nagar
7	Nayyadi Para	8	Cheenambuthur
9	Kavathikkalam West	10	Kavathikkalam East
11	Valiyaparamba	12	West Villur
13	Pappaayi	14	East Villur
15	Kooriyad	16	Panikkarkundu
17	Indianoor West	18	Indianoor
19	Muliyankotta	20	Maravattam
21	Kottoor	22	Madrasappadi
23	Amappara	24	Kuttippuram
25	Alinchuvadu	26	Poozhikkunnu
27	Palathara	28	Kottakkulam
29	Pulikkodu	30	Thokkampara
31	Changuvettykkundu	32	Khurbani

== Municipality Election 2020 ==
=== Political Performance in Election 2020 ===
S.No.	Party name	Party symbol	Number of Councilors
01	IUML		21
02	LDF		5
03	Independents		4
04	BJP		2

2010 seat distribution: UDF - 24,LDF - 4, BJP- 2
