= Febrifugum =

Febrifugum may refer to:

- Gymnostachyum febrifugum
- Psorospermum febrifugum
