= Kottakkal =

Kottakkal Land of the Fort
- Municipal town
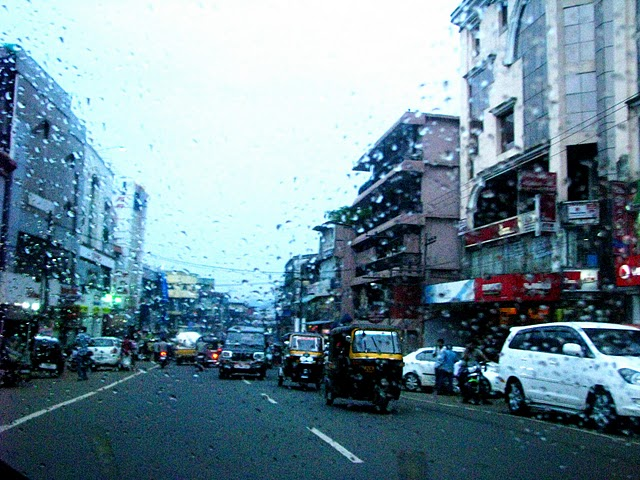
- Kottakkal Town rainy day
- Nickname: Ayurveda City
- Kottakkal (Kerala) Kottakkal (India) Kottakkal (Asia) Kottakkal (Earth)
- Coordinates: 10.9990°N 75.9918°E
- Country: India
- State: Kerala
- District: Malappuram

Government
  - Type: Municipal council
  - Body: Kottakkal Municipality
  - Chairperson: K.K Nasar (IUML)
  - Vice Chairperson: Paroli Ramla Teacher (IUML)

Area
  - Total: 20.45 km^{2} (7.90 sq mi)
- Elevation: 84.34 m (276.7 ft)

Population (2011)
  - Total: 44,382
  - Density: 2,170/km^{2} (5,621/sq mi)

Languages
  - Official: Malayalam, English
- Time zone: UTC+5:30 (IST)
- PIN: 676503
- Telephone code: +91483xxxxxxx
- Vehicle registration: KL-10, KL-55, KL-65
- Website: kottakkalmunicipality.lsgkerala.gov.in/en

Kottakkal (literally-Land of the Fort) is a major municipal town in Malappuram district in Kerala, having 32 wards. It is one of the four municipalities in Tirur Taluk, besides Tirur, Valanchery, and Tanur. It is a part of the Malappuram metropolitan area and a growing city in Kerala. The town is best known for the Arya Vaidya Sala, one of the top Ayurvedic health centres in the world. Kottakkal is also a major growing commercial, educational, and healthcare hub in South Malabar. The town lies on the Mumbai–Kanyakumari National Highway 66.

Kottakkal is located 12 km (7.5 mi) southwest of Malappuram, the district headquarters, and 14.5 km (9.0 mi) from Tirur railway station.The National Highway 66 separates the municipality from Edarikode grama panchayat on some parts to the west. However, the fast-developing Kottakkal urban area is now spread up to different parts of neighboring panchayats such as Edarikkode.

Kottakkal town became famous after the establishment of Arya Vaidya Sala in 1902. Adding to the cultural heritage, Kottakkal Pooram, The popular temple festival is celebrated over seven days during March–April.

== History ==
An Old Malayalam inscription which dates back to 932 CE found from Indianoor in Kottakkal mention the name of Goda Ravi of Chera dynasty.

Kottakkal, formerly known as Sweta Durgam (the White Fort) in Sanskrit, Venkalikotta and Venkita Kotta in Malayalam, was a military base of the Kingdom of Valluvanadu earlier.

Two swords, medieval European in style and finish, were discovered in a well from Kottakkal, in the year 2013. The Zamorin of Calicut invaded the Kingdom of Valluvanad in 14th century CE and seized the fort at Kottakkal. The Zamorin captuted the captaincy of Mamankam festival in the same period. Karuvayoor Moosad, who was the minister of Valluvakonathiri, based at Kottakkal and also the chief marshal and preacher of the Moopil Nairs, changed his seat to Puzhakkattiri when Kottakkal came under Zamorin. It may be the forts and castles constructed by the Karuvayoor Moosad that were the origin of the name "Kottakkal".

The Kizhakke Kovilakam, where the eastern branch of the royal family of Zamorin resided, is located at Kottakkal.Gradually, Kottakkal was annexed to the kingdom of the Zamorin of Calicut. The Kizhakke Kovilakam, which was the eastern palace of the royal family of the Zamorin of Calicut, is present at Kottakkal.

Arya Vaidya Sala was established in 1902. The suburbs of Kottakkal were known as Changuvettikkadu and Eyyakkadu (now Changuvetti is developing as a twin town to Kottakkal).

== Municipal elections ==
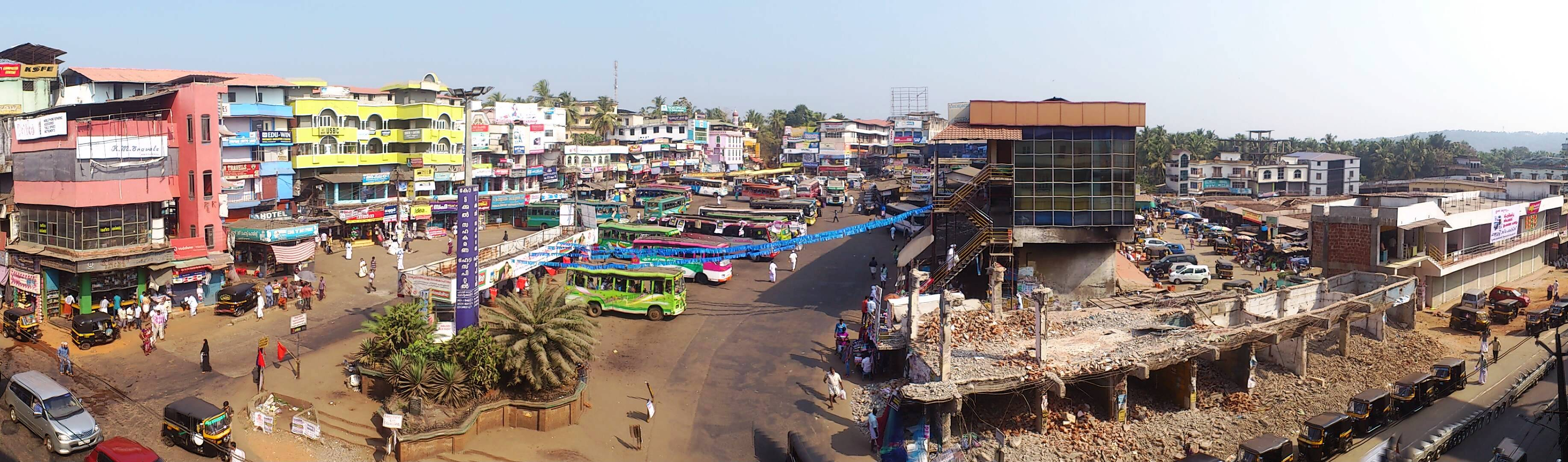
Kottakkal town

The United Democratic Front won the first elections (held in October 2010) to the Kottakkal municipality. K. K. Nazar and Paroli Moosakutty Haji of Indian Union Muslim League were elected as the Chairperson and Vice-Chairman respectively of the municipality. Other major Political representatives in the Municipality include TP Subair and Nani of Left Democratic Front.

=== Kottakkal Municipality Election 2020 ===
S.No.	Party name	Party symbol	Number of Councillors
01	UDF		20
02	Independents		07
03	LDF		03
04	BJP		02

== Notable people ==
- U. A. Beeran
- Jayasree Kalathil, researcher
- Kottakkal Madhu, Kathakali singer
- Athippatta Moideen Kutty Musliyar, Islamic scholar
- Sangita Madhavan Nair, actress
- V. C. Balakrishna Panicker
- K. C. Manavedan Raja, founder of Raja's High School, Zamorin of Calicut during 1932-1937
- M. P. Abdussamad Samadani, politician, MLA, former Member of Parliament
- Kottakkal Sivaraman, Kathakali artist
- Najma Thabsheera Lawyer and politician
- Manorama Thampuratti, Sanskrit poet
- Vaidyaratnam P. S. Varier, founder of Kottakkal Arya Vaidya Sala
- M. K. Vellodi, Indian civil servant, diplomat, former Cabinet Secretary
- P. K. Warrier
- Sachin Warrier, playback singer and composer

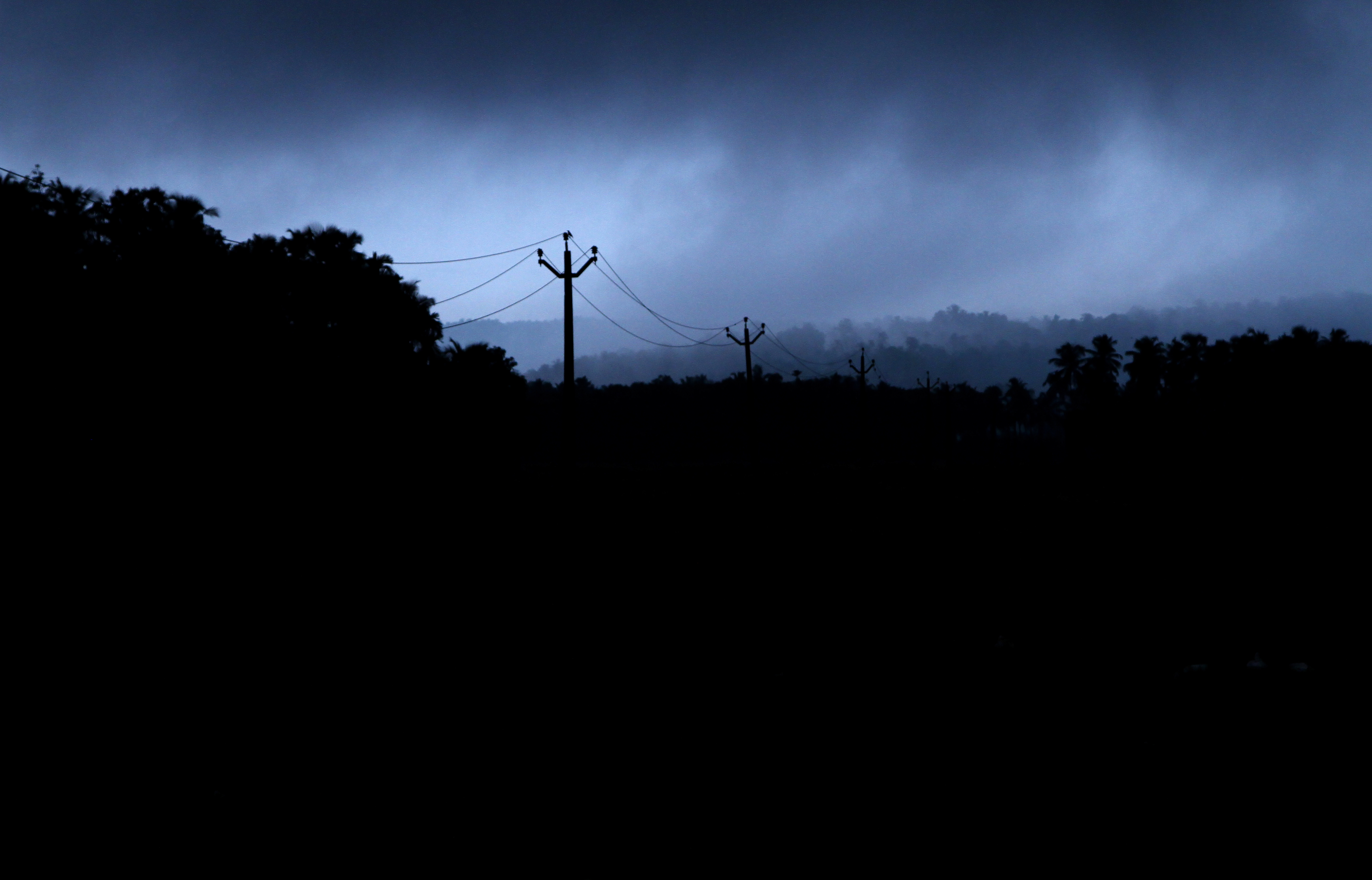
Moody Evening

== Basic information of Kottakkal Municipality ==
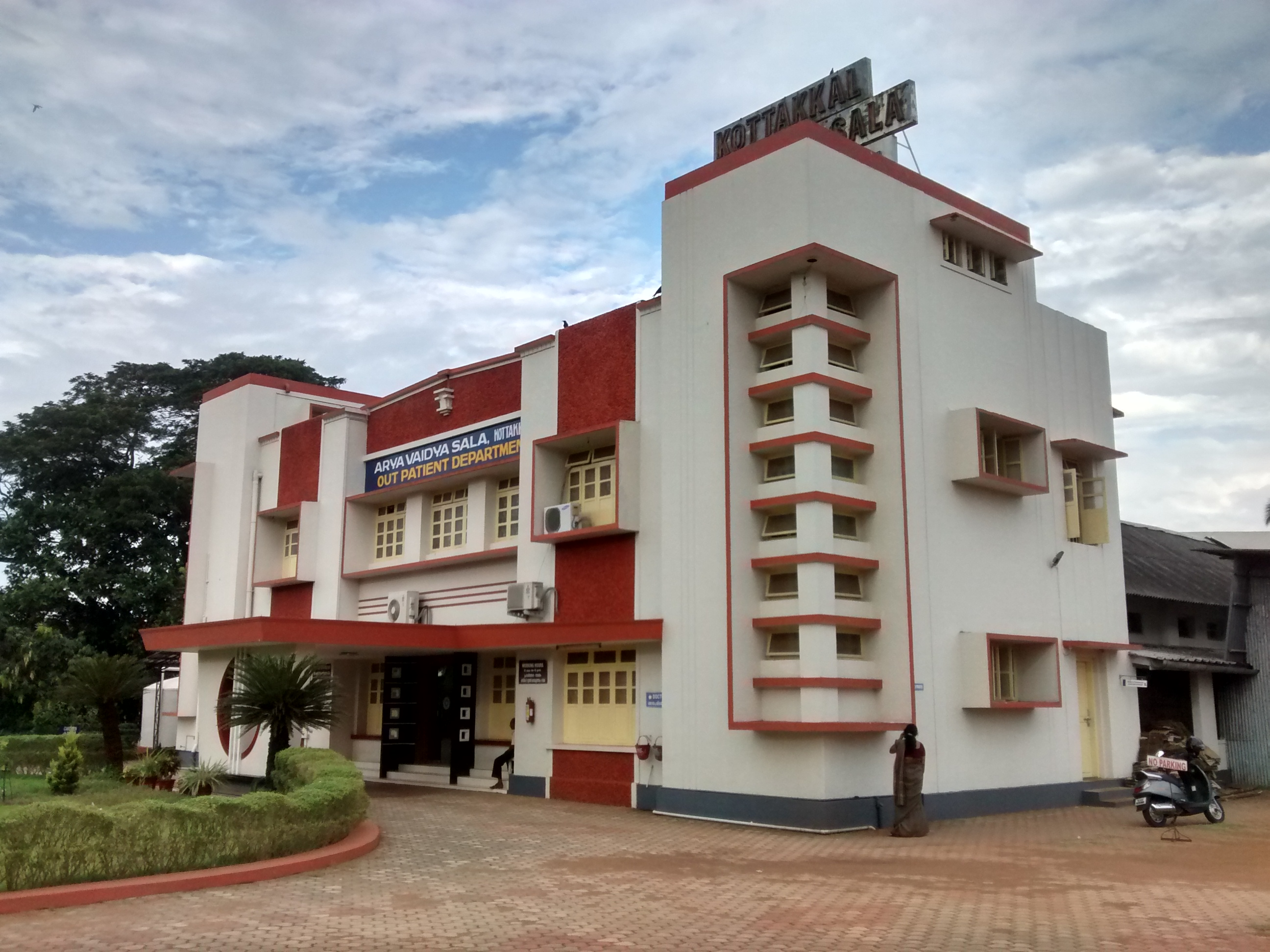
Kottakkal Arya Vaidya Sala, Out Patients Block

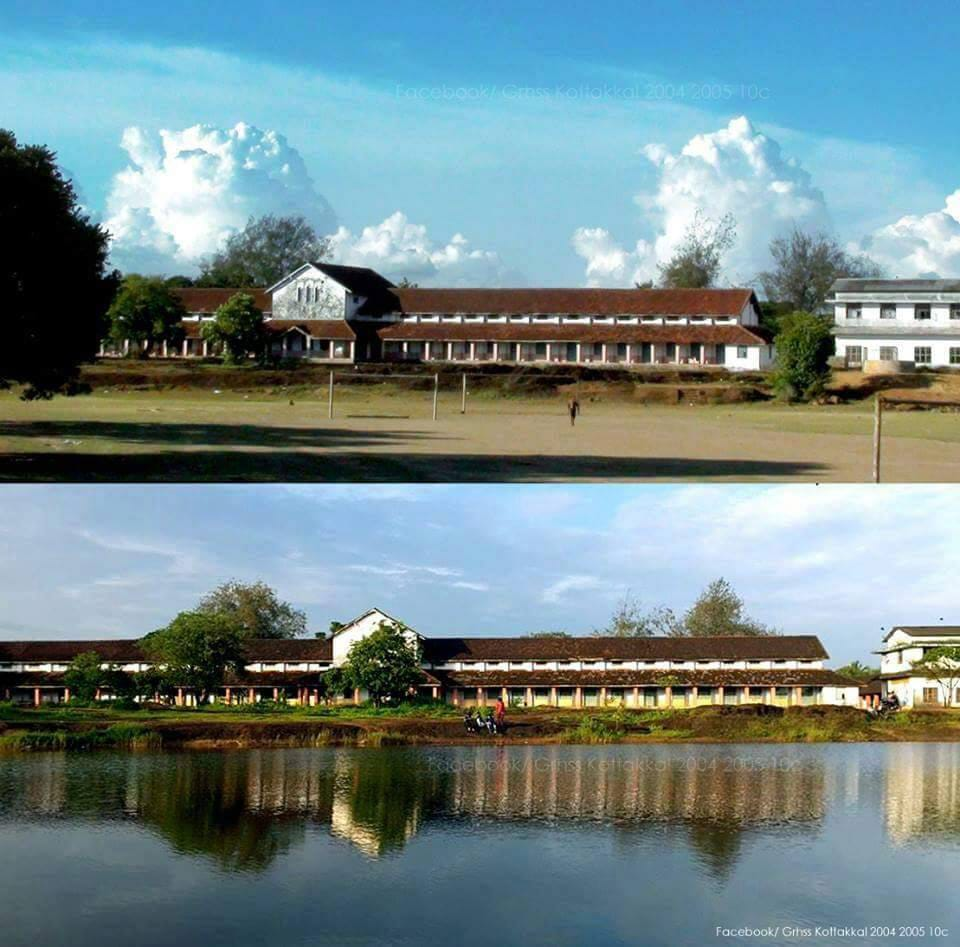
Government Rajah's Higher Secondary School, Kottakkal

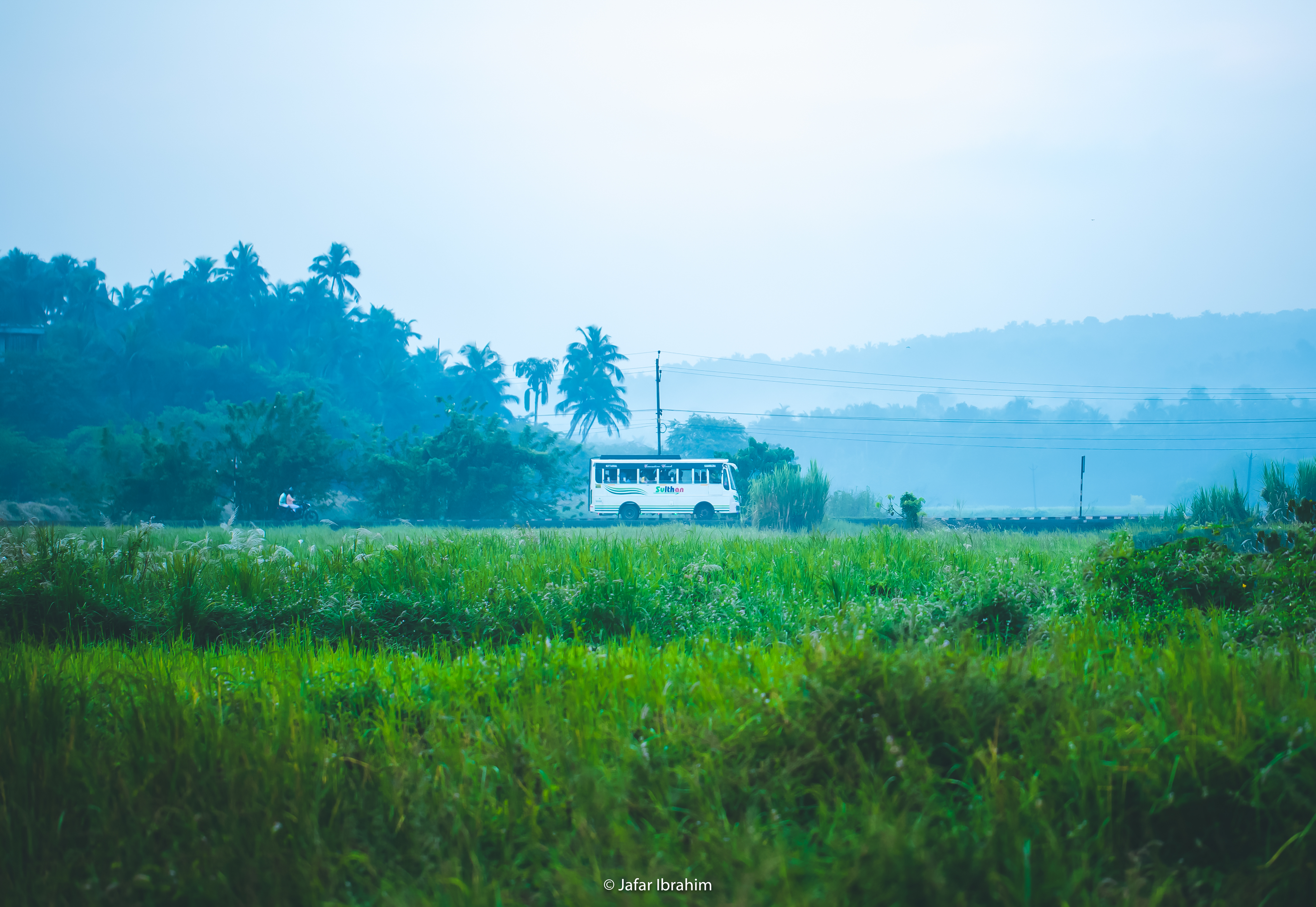
Puthur, Kottakkal

Area	20.43 km^{2} (7.89 sq mi)
Wards	32
Taluk	Tirur
Assembly Constituency	Kottakkal
Loksabha Constituency	Ponnani
Vehicle Registration No.	KL-55, KL-10 & KL-65
Neighbouring Panchayaths	Edarikode, Parappur, Othukkungal, Ponmala and Marakkara
Post Offices	Kottakkal, Puthoor, Indianoor, Pathayakkallu, Kuttippuram, Pandamangalam, Cherushola, Puthupparamba
Pincodes	676501, 676503, 676510

Kottakkal Municipality

=== Wards ===
Kottakkal Municipality is composed of the following 32 wards:

Ward no.	Name	Ward no.	Name
1	Changuvetty Junction	2	Choonda
3	Kottakkal Town	4	Kottakkal Thazhe Angadi
5	Palappura	6	Mythrinagar
7	Nayadippara	8	Cheenambuthur
9	Kavathikalam West	10	Kavathikalam East
11	Valiyaparamba	12	West Villur
13	Pappayi	14	East Villur
15	Kooriyad	16	Panikkarkundu
17	Indianoor West	18	Indianoor East
19	Muliyankootta	20	Maravettum
21	Kottoor	22	Madrasapadi
23	Amapara	24	Kuttippuram
25	Aalinchuvadu	26	Poozhikkunnu
27	Palathara	28	Kottakkulam
29	Pulikkode	30	Thokkambara
31	Changuvettykundu	32	Khurbani

== Transportation ==
- Bus services: Kottakkal Bus station at the heart of the town, links to all rural bus services around Kottakkal locality and Long route services connecting nearby towns like Tirur, Manjeri, Malappuram, Perinthalmanna, Valanchery etc. KSRTC service also available.
- Railway Station: Tirur railway station is one of the major railway stations in the Malabar region. Almost every train stops here, connecting the Malappuram district to the rest of the country. It is located 14 km away from the Kottakkal town. Passengers from Kottakkal can also access Angadippuram railway station which is about 26 km from kottakkal town.
- Nearest Airport: Calicut International Airport is approximately 25 kilometres away.

== Nearby places ==
- Cherukulamba
- Edarikode
- Indianoor
- Kadampuzha
- Kalpakanchery
- Kavathikalam
- Marakkara
- Maravattam
- Oorakam
- Othukkungal
- Padapparamba
- Pang
- Parappur
- Pottippara
- Puthanathani
- Vengara
- Venniyour
- Vettichira

== See also ==
- Kottakkal Assembly constituency
- Malappuram Lok Sabha constituency
