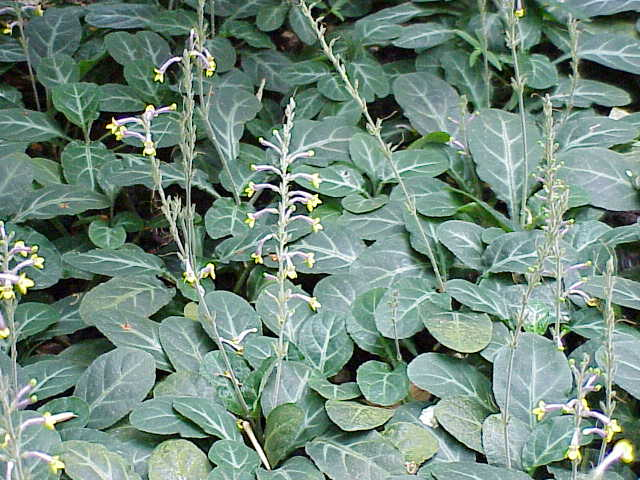
- Gymnostachyum ceylanicum

Scientific classification
- Kingdom: Plantae
- Clade: Tracheophytes
- Clade: Angiosperms
- Clade: Eudicots
- Clade: Asterids
- Order: Lamiales
- Family: Acanthaceae
- Subfamily: Acanthoideae
- Tribe: Andrographideae
- Genus: Gymnostachyum; Nees (1832)

Synonyms
- Cryptophragmium Nees (1832); Odontostigma Zoll. & Moritzi (1845); Parajusticia Benoist (1936); Petracanthus Nees (1847); Sarcanthera Raf. (1838)

= Gymnostachyum =

Genus of flowering plants

Gymnostachyum is a genus of flowering plants in the family Acanthaceae. It includes 50 species native to tropical Asia, ranging from the Indian subcontinent through Indochina to southern China, Peninsular Malaysia, Sumatra, Java, and the Philippines.

== Species ==
50 species are accepted.

- Gymnostachyum affine Nees
- Gymnostachyum ceylanicum Arn. & Nees
- Gymnostachyum coriaceum Imlay
- Gymnostachyum cumingianum Nees
- Gymnostachyum decurrens Stapf
- Gymnostachyum diversifolium C.B.Clarke
- Gymnostachyum febrifugum Benth.
- Gymnostachyum glabrum T.Anderson
- Gymnostachyum glomeratum (Blume) Bremek.
- Gymnostachyum glomeruliflorum Bremek.
- Gymnostachyum gracile Bremek.
- Gymnostachyum hirsutum T.Anderson
- Gymnostachyum hirtistylum C.B.Clarke
- Gymnostachyum hirtum Ridl.
- Gymnostachyum insulare Ridl.
- Gymnostachyum javanicum Nees
- Gymnostachyum kanthanense Kiew
- Gymnostachyum keithii Ridl.
- Gymnostachyum larsenii Bremek.
- Gymnostachyum lateriflorum (C.B.Clarke) B.Hansen
- Gymnostachyum latifolium (Dalzell) T.Anderson
- Gymnostachyum leptostachyum Nees
- Gymnostachyum listeri Prain
- Gymnostachyum longifolium T.Anderson ex T.Cooke
- Gymnostachyum longispicatum Merr.
- Gymnostachyum magis-nervatum C.B.Clarke
- Gymnostachyum pallens C.B.Clarke
- Gymnostachyum paniculatum T.Anderson
- Gymnostachyum pictum Elmer
- Gymnostachyum polyanthum Wight
- Gymnostachyum polyneuron C.B.Clarke
- Gymnostachyum pubescens (Lam.) M.R.Almeida
- Gymnostachyum ridleyi C.B.Clarke
- Gymnostachyum sahyadricum C.N.Mohanan, Remadevi & Binojk.
- Gymnostachyum sanguinolentum (Nees) T.Anderson
- Gymnostachyum scortechinii C.B.Clarke
- Gymnostachyum signatum (Benoist) Imlay
- Gymnostachyum simplicicaule C.B.Clarke
- Gymnostachyum sinense (H.S.Lo) H.Chu
- Gymnostachyum spiciforme (Elmer) Merr.
- Gymnostachyum subacaule (Zoll. & Moritzi) Bremek.
- Gymnostachyum subrosulatum H.S.Lo (synonym Gymnostachyum kwangsiense H.S.Lo)
- Gymnostachyum thwaitesii T.Anderson
- Gymnostachyum tomentosum T.Anderson
- Gymnostachyum trichosepalum Merr.
- Gymnostachyum triflorum Ridl.
- Gymnostachyum trilobum Ridl.
- Gymnostachyum variegatum Hallier.f.
- Gymnostachyum venustum (Wall.) T.Anderson
- Gymnostachyum warrieranum K.M.P.Kumar, Balach. & V.B.Sreek.

== Gallery ==
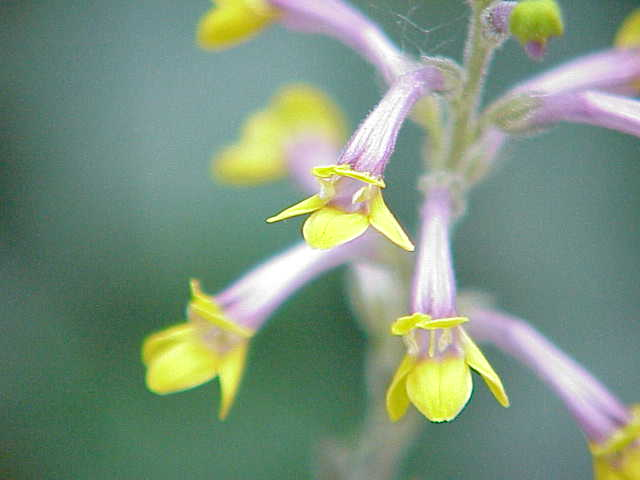

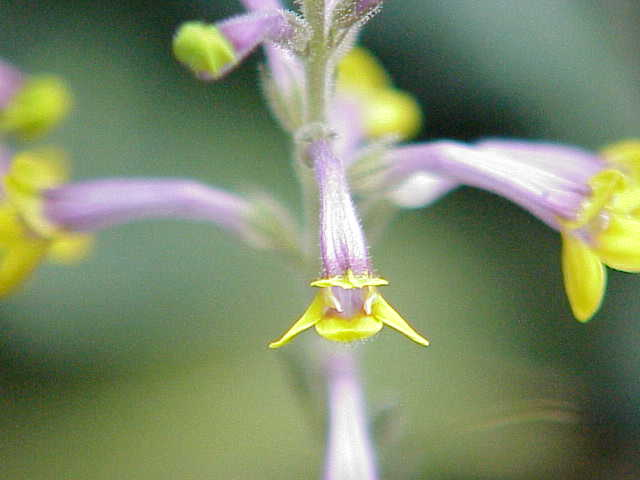

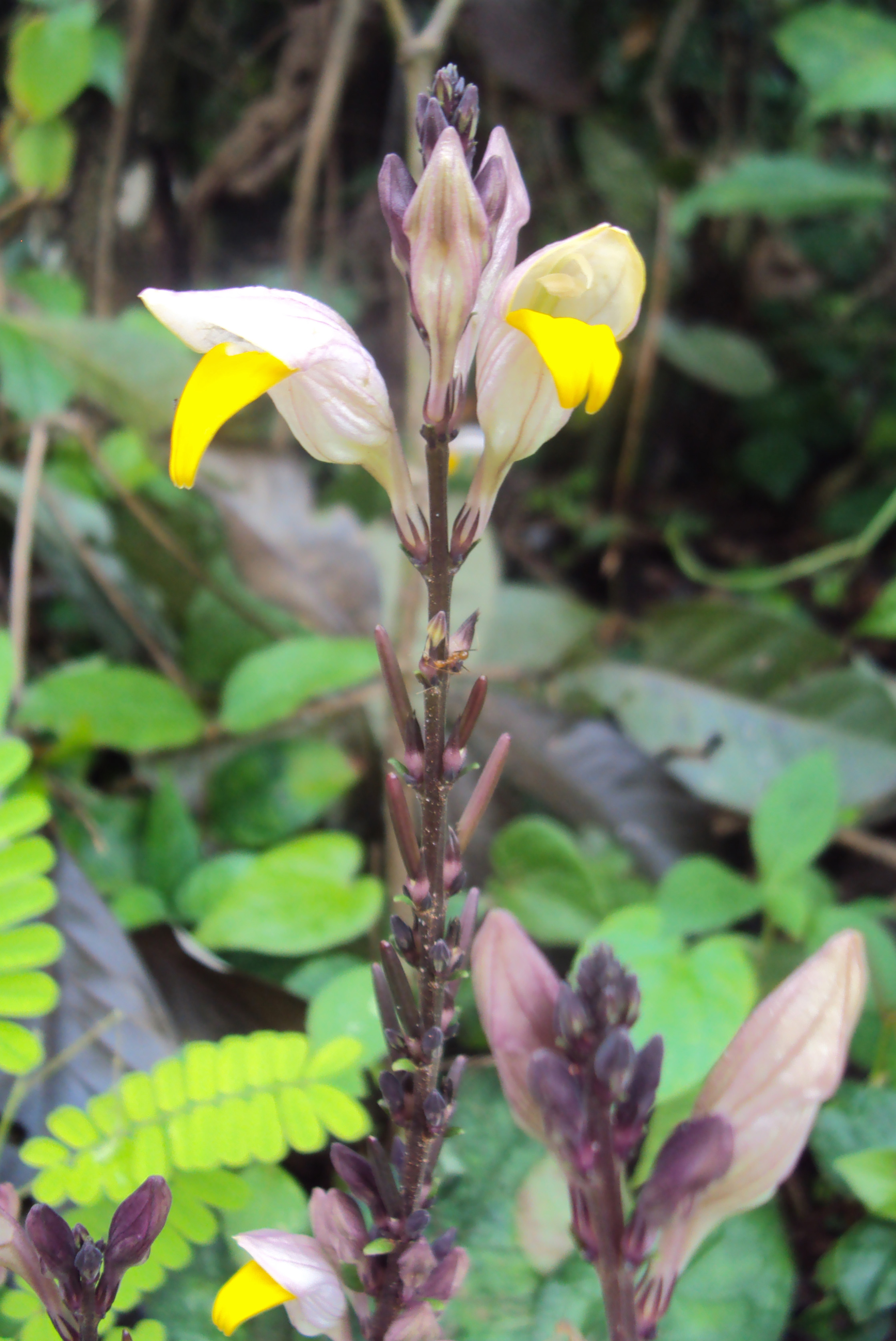

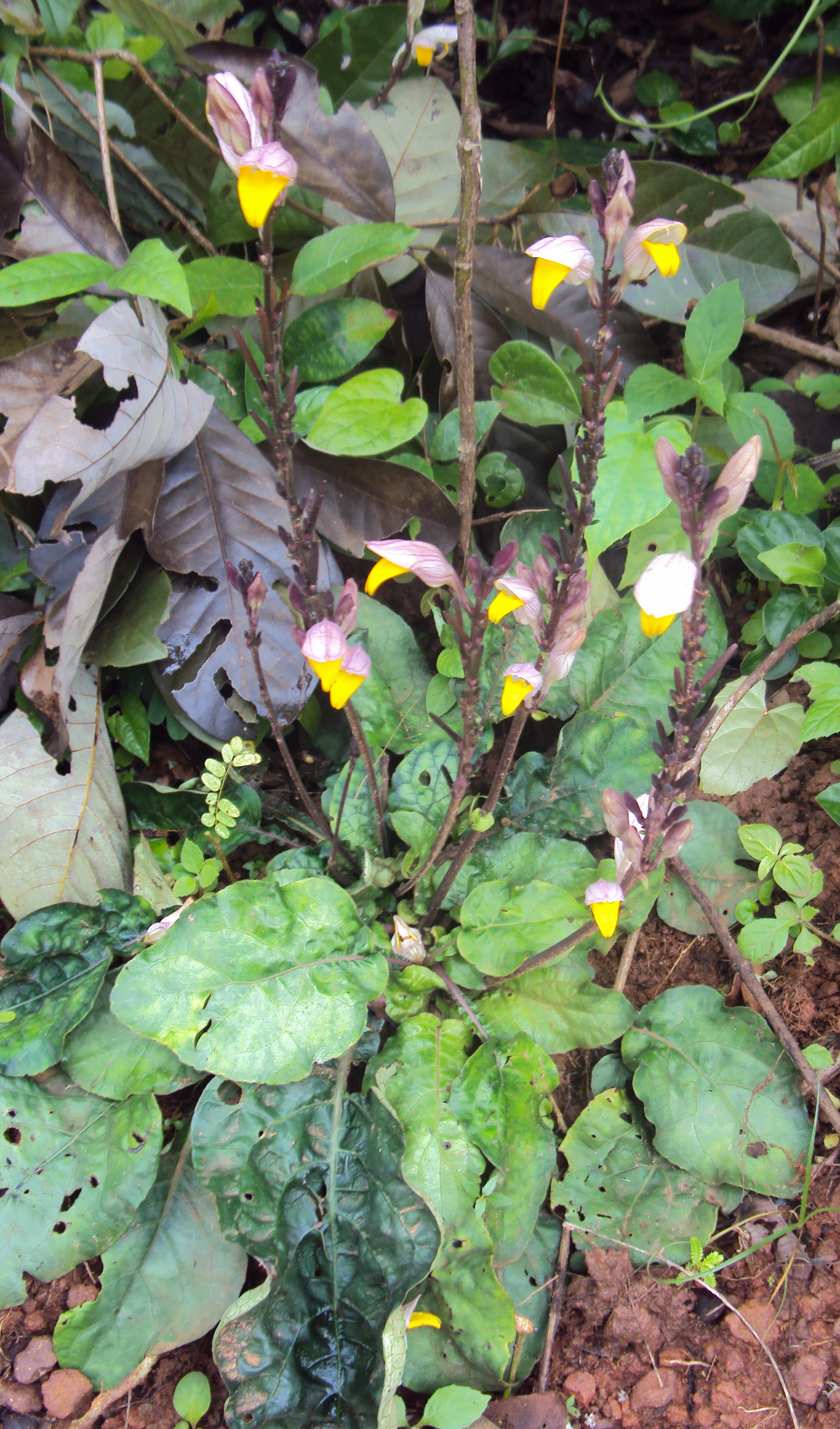

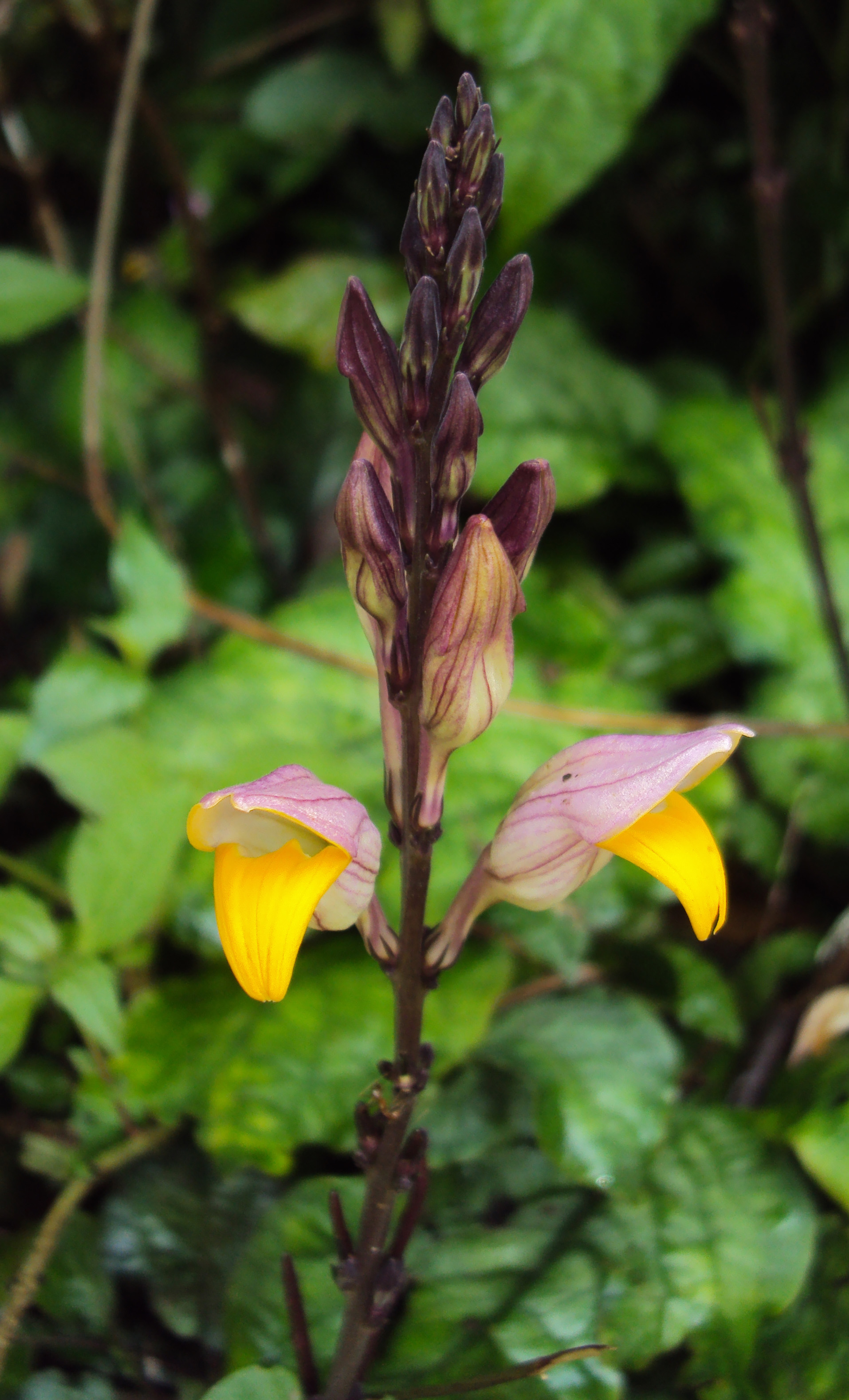
