= Kottakkal pooram =

Temple festival in Kerala, India

Kottakkal pooram is a temple festival in Sree Viswambhara Temple, Kottakkal, Malappuram District in Kerala, India.

== Dhanvantari ==
It is celebrated to honour Dhanvantari, the patron god of medicine and health.

== Programs ==
The grand celebrations in connection with the festival also includes cultural programmes by artists. During the seven days, famous classical artists of the country perform. Cultural programmes include Kathakali and Mohiniyattam.
