= Vaidyaratnam P. S. Varier =

Indian Ayurveda practitioner

- Born: 10 April 1869; Kottakkal, Malabar District, Madras Presidency, British India (present day Malappuram, Kerala, India)
- Died: 30 January 1944 (aged 74)
- Occupations: Ayurveda practitioner; Entrepreneur
- Awards: Vaidyaratnam

Vaidyaratnam Panniyampally Sankunni Varier (10 April 1869 – 30 January 1944) was an Ayurveda practitioner from what is now Kerala, India. He is well-regarded as the founder of Kottakkal Arya Vaidya Sala, a major Ayurvedic treatment centre in Kerala.

== Life and career ==
Panniyampally Sankunni Varier was born in 1869 in Kottakkal in erstwhile Malabar district in Madras Presidency. His parents were Marayamangalam Rama Varier and Panniyampally Kunjukutti Varasyar. He was the eldest son of his parents. Sankunni got his family name, Panniyampally, through matrilineal succession. Variyar (also written as Variar, Varyar, Warriar or Warrier) is a Hindu Ambalavasi caste in Kerala, India, who have traditionally associated with temple services.

Sankunni started his lessons in Ayurveda under the classical Gurukula system from Kuttanchery Vasudevan Moos, a Brahmin who belonged to one of the eight families of Ayurvedic practitioner in Kerala, the ashtavaidyans, in the year 1886 as a seventeen-year-old. He also acquired proficiency in the practice of Allopathy.

In 1902, Varier founded Arya Vaidya Sala for the manufacture and sale of ayurvedic medicines which later became synonymous with ayurvedic treatment in India. The Pathshala established in 1917 has now become an Ayurveda College affiliated to Kerala University of Health Sciences (KUHS).

Varier is credited with pioneering the practice of manufacturing ayurvedic medicines. He also wrote textbooks for students of Ayurveda. One of them, Ashtangasariram, won a certificate in 1932 from the National Organisation of Physicians. He was an art connoisseur and founded a drama troupe which was developed to be the famous Kathakali troupe, P.S.V. Natyasangham.

He died in 1944 at the age of 75. He was succeeded by his nephew P. Madhava Varier, who continued until his death in an aeroplane crash in 1953. Later Arya Vaidya Sala came under his youngest nephew Dr. P. K. Warrier, who continued for 68 years until his death in 2021, aged 100. Now, it is managed by Dr. P. Madhavankurry Varrier, his grand-nephew.

== Major awards and Recognitions ==
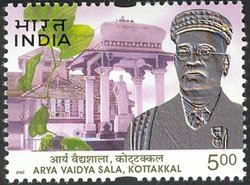
Stamp of India - 2002 - Arya Vaidya Sala Kottakkal and its founder P. S. Varier.

In 1933, in recognition of his services to humanity, P. S. Varier was conferred the title of 'Vaidyaratna' by Viceroy and Governor-General of British India. The Government of India has issued a postage stamp in his honour bearing his image.
