= Kavathikalam =

- Village
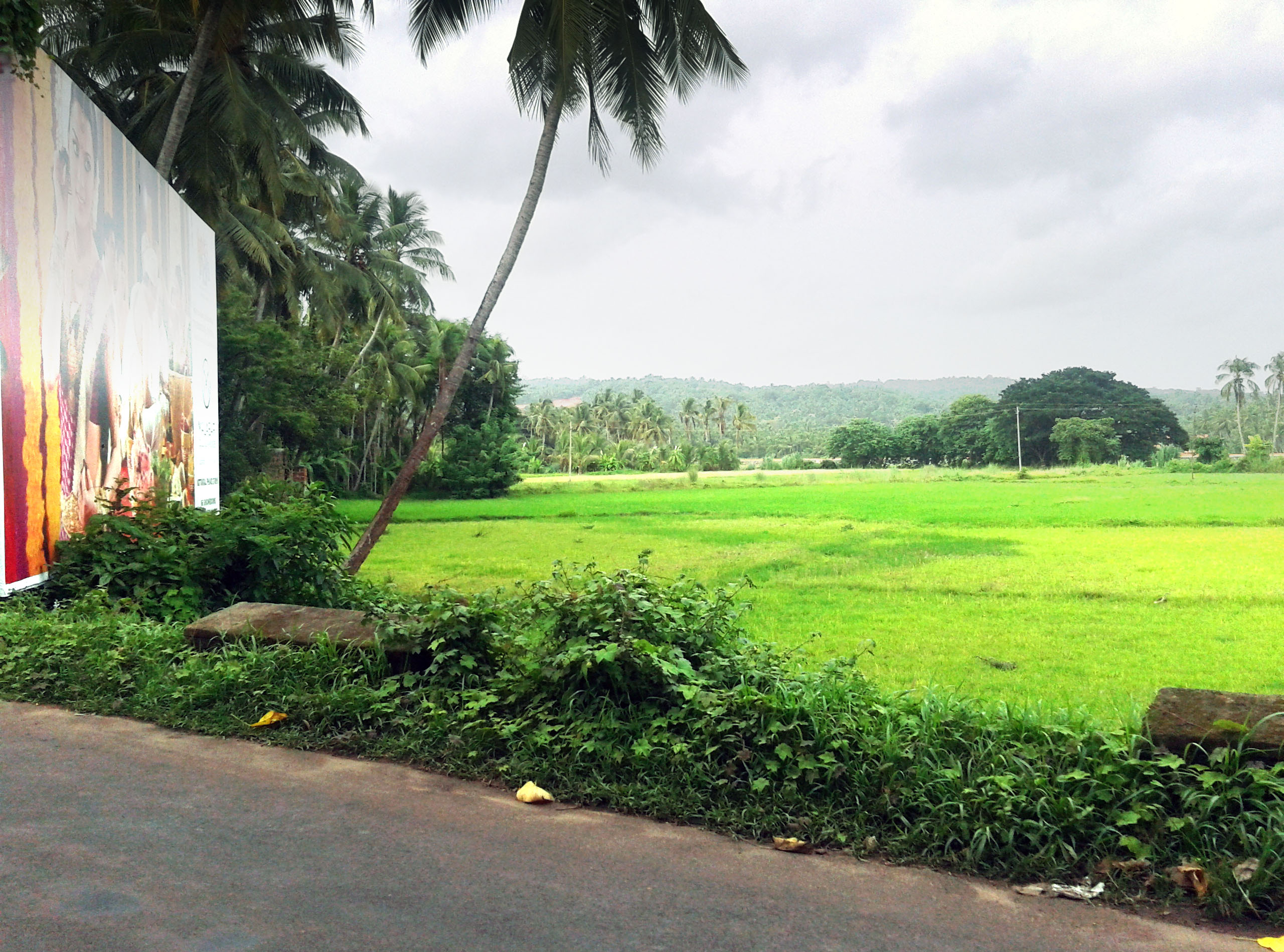

- Location within India
- Coordinates: 10°58′34.900″N 76°0′55.199″E
- Country: India
- State: Kerala
- District: Malappuram
- City: Kottakkal
- Settled: 1770s

Kavadikalam is a town in Malappuram district, Kerala, India.

== Location ==
The town is located east of the Kottakkal municipality. It is 2 kilometers away from Kottakkal town.

== Education ==
- ALPS Kavathikalam (School)
- Najmul Huda Higher Secondary School

== Religion ==
The major religions in the localities are Islam and Hinduism. Kavathikalam Juma Masjid is the main devotional institute for Muslims and Kavathikalam Siva Temple is the main devotional center for Hindus.
