= Parappur =

Parappur Malappuram
- Census town
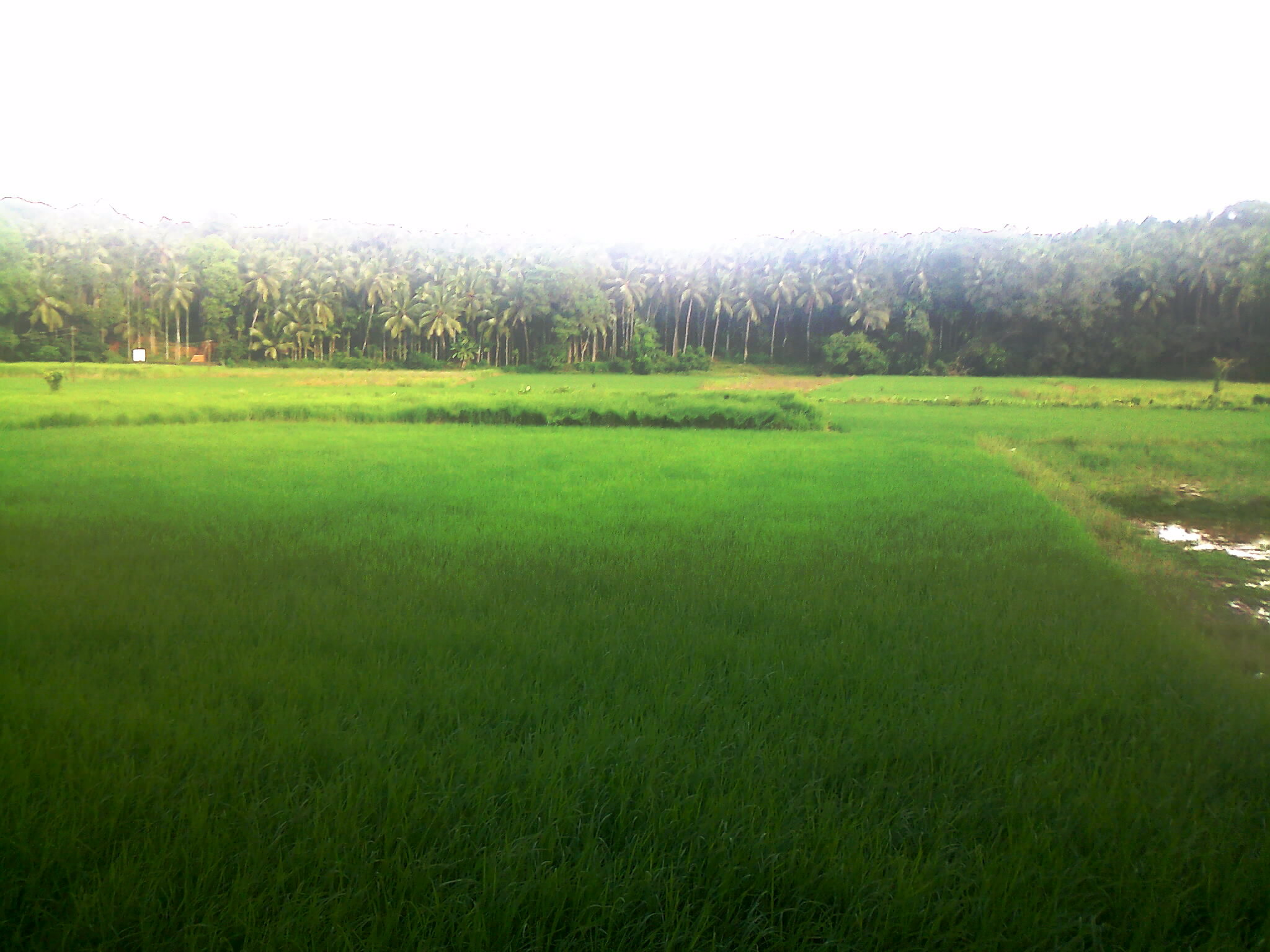
- Paddy fields in Parappur

- Location in Kerala, India Parappur Malappuram (India)
- Coordinates: 11.0335300°N 76.000100°E
- Country: India
- State: Kerala
- District: Malappuram
- Established: 1956

Government
  - Type: Panchayat

Area
  - Total: 15.11 km^{2} (5.83 sq mi)
- Elevation: 45 m (148 ft)

Population (2011)
  - Total: 36,270
  - Density: 2,400/km^{2} (6,200/sq mi)

Languages
  - Official: Malayalam, English
- Time zone: UTC+5:30 (IST)
- PIN: 676503
- Telephone code: 0483
- Vehicle registration: KL-65
- Nearest Town: Kottakkal
- Sex ratio: 1062 ♂/♀
- Literacy: 91.45%
- Lok Sabha constituency: Malappuram
- Vidhan Sabha constituency: Vengara
- Website: lsgkerala.in/parappurpanchayat/

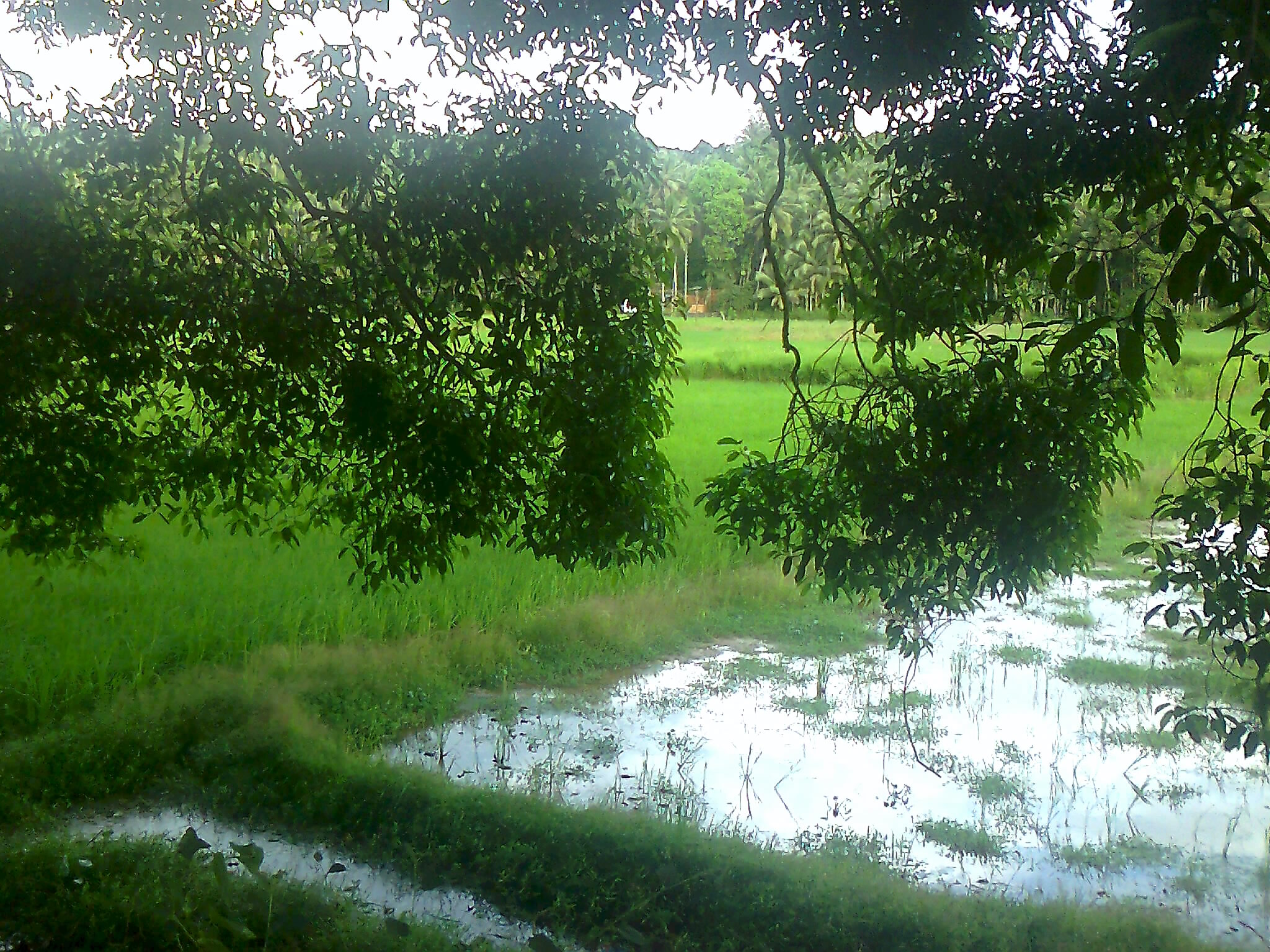
Paddy fields

Parappur is a village and townland two kilometers north of Kottakkal in Malappuram district in the state of Kerala, India.

The village's landscape can be divided into six plains, slopes, valleys, plains, rivers and streams. Parappur Panchayath was established in the year 1956, the year of Kerala's birth. Kadalundipuzha Panchayat, which originates from Sahyadri and flows through Karuvarakundu basement and many panchayats in Malappuram district, divides it into two. The first president was TE Muhammad Haji. Elections were not held at that time. The delegates were elected through a hands-on vote at the Block Foundation.

== History ==
Kottakkal East Kovilakam which belonged to the Zamorin of Calicut was the landlord of most of the land holdings in the area. The landlords who owned the land in Iringalloor belonged to the Kolpuram Keezhathukunnam Panicker family, which had its roots in Kozhikode. The legendary Land Reforms Act, implemented in the 1970s, brought the veil to feudalism in other parts of Kerala as well. The old Juma Masjid, such as Ililipilakkal, Vettam, Palani, Kuzhipuram West Palli, Kuzhipuram East Mosque, Veenalukkal Juma Masjid and Vadakkum Muri Mosque are around 200 to 400 years old. The Sree Kurumba Temple at Veenalukkal, the Sree Subramanya Temple, the Iringalloor Sree Ayyappan Kavu Temple, the Katiyakavu Sreebhagavati Temple and the Ashramamangalam Shiva Temple are some of the ancient temples.

Established in the East of the 20th Century, Parappur, a leading educational center, was established in 1901 in East Kund, becoming the East AMLP School. The eleventh state congress of the historic Congress was held in 1939 under the leadership of EMS Namboodiripad, who was the then KPCC President Mohammed Abdurahiman Sahib. The first educational institute to be established in the Parappur Panchayath was the Callakkattil School which was established in 1901 and the only Teachers' School which was established in 1903 in the East.

== Geography ==
The village has an area of 15.11 km2 (4,473 sq mi) and is bordered by Vengara, Ooragam and Othukkungal villages to the north and Othukkungal village to the east, Edarikkod and Kottakkal villages to the south and the Edarikkod and Vengara towards the west.it is under the Vengara legislative assembly seat. Kadalundi River flows through many regions in the Parappur village. Some times during the extreme monsoon seasons the river tends to overflow and makes its way to the village settlements and the paddy fields causing disturbances to the local life.

== Demographics ==
As of 2011 India census, Parappur had a population of 36270 with 16975 males and 19295 females.

== Economy ==
The movement of many migrant workers from the village to the GCC states continues to the present day, although in smaller numbers after the 2008 international financial crisis began to affect the GCC region.

== Transportation ==
Parappur village connects to other parts of India through Kottakkal town. National highway No.66 passes through Kottakkal and the northern stretch connects to Goa and Mumbai. The southern stretch connects to Cochin and Trivandrum. State Highway No.28 starts from Nilambur and connects to Ooty, Mysore and Bangalore through Highways.12,29 and 181. National Highway No.966 connects to Palakkad and Coimbatore. The nearest airport is at Kozhikode. The nearest major railway station is at Tirur.

== Educational Institutes ==
Parappur village has some of the popular educational institutes in the locality such as, IU Higher secondary school, IU Arts college and many Upper and Lower primary schools.
