= Edarikode =

Edarikode എടരിക്കോട്
- Village
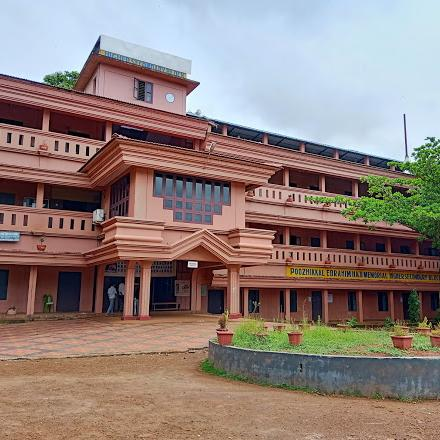
- PKMMHSS Edarikode
- Interactive map of Edarikode
- Coordinates: 10°59′0″N 75°58′0″E
- Country: India
- State: Kerala
- District: Malappuram

Malayalam¡
  - Official: Malayalam, English
- Time zone: UTC+5:30 (IST)
- PIN: 676501
- Telephone code: 0483
- Vehicle registration: KL-55, KL-10
- Lok Sabha constituency: Ponnani
- Climate: good (Köppen)

Edarikode is a village near the town of Kottakkal in the Malappuram district of Kerala, India.
