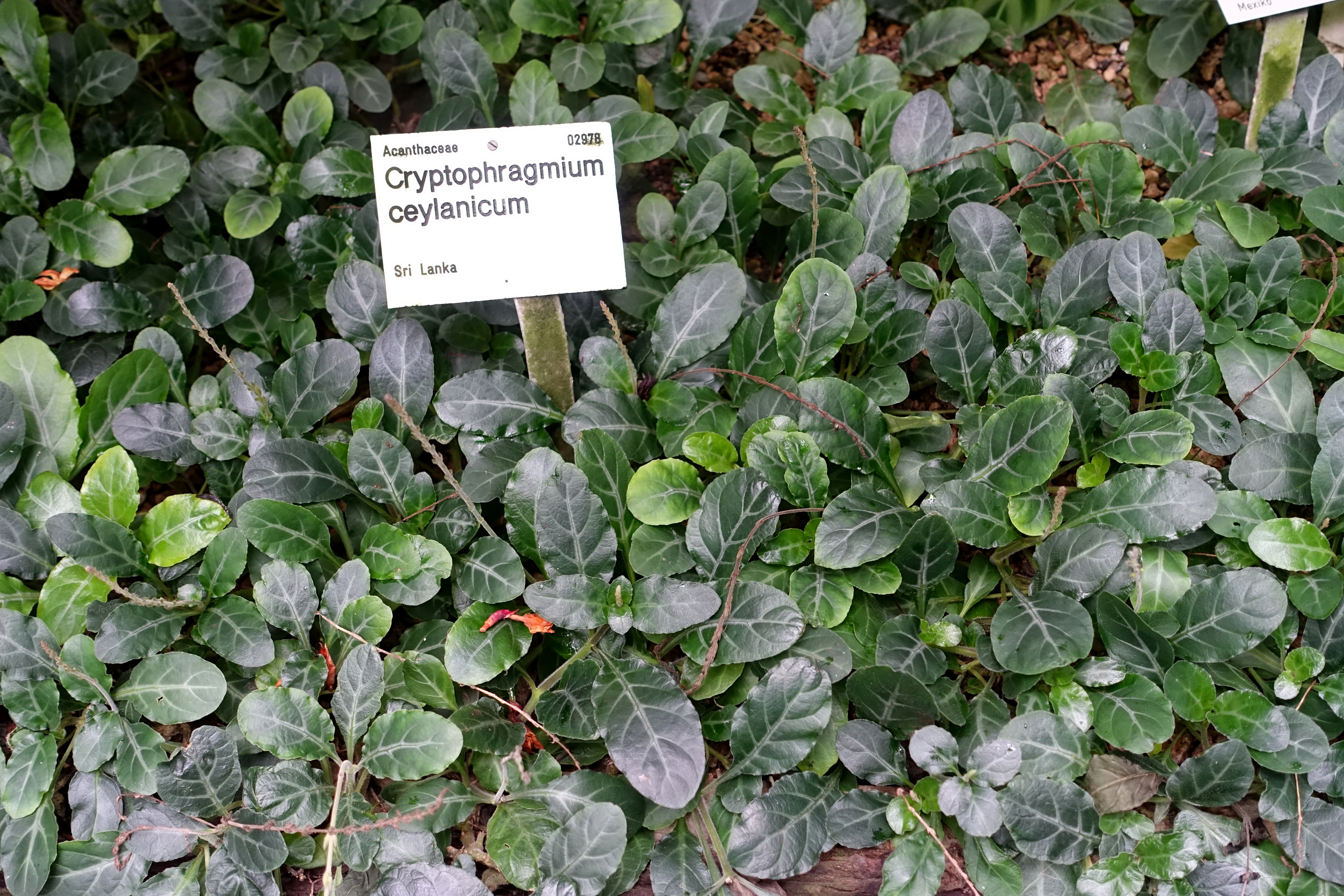

Scientific classification
- Kingdom: Plantae
- Clade: Tracheophytes
- Clade: Angiosperms
- Clade: Eudicots
- Clade: Asterids
- Order: Lamiales
- Family: Acanthaceae
- Genus: Gymnostachyum
- Species: G. ceylanicum

Binomial name
- Gymnostachyum ceylanicum Arn. & Nees

= Gymnostachyum ceylanicum =

Species of flowering plant

Gymnostachyum ceylanicum is a small plant endemic to Sri Lanka. Plants grow to heights of 5-15 centimeters, with simple leaves that are opposite, and racemes of light-purple tubular flowers.

== Synonyms ==
- Cryptophragmium ceylanicum Kuntze
