= PKMMHSS Edarikode =

PKMM Higher Secondary School Edarikode
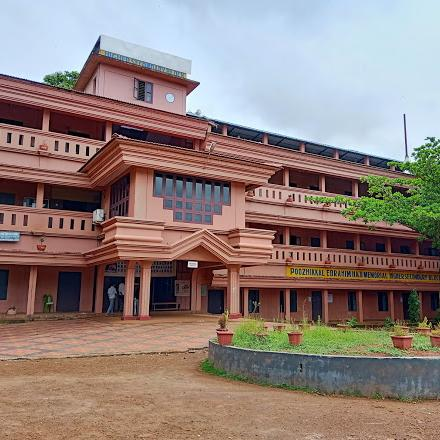

Location
- Edarikode, Malappuram district Kerala, 676501; India
- Coordinates: 11°00′07.7″N 75°59′02.1″E

Information
- Type: Public
- Motto: Towards Light
- Established: 1979
- Principal: Mr Muhammad Shafi
- Grades: VIII - XII
- Affiliation: SCERT Kerala

Location of PKMMHSS Edarikode

PKMM Higher Secondary School Edarikode, or locally known as Edarikode School, is a higher secondary school in Edarikode, Malappuram district of Kerala state in India. It is the school in Kerala, where the maximum number of students appear for the Secondary School Leaving Certificate. The school is best known for the maximum number of A+ in Kerala. The school is also known for its better performance in the Kerala School Kalolsavam. The institution was established in the year 1979. The school has shown its excellency in curricular and extra-curricular activities.

== History ==
It was started as a Pallikoodam and in 1979 it was transformed as a school. In 2000, it was upgraded into a Higher Secondary School.

== Notable alumni ==
- Najma Thabsheera, National Secretary, Muslim Youth League
