= Gymnostachyum kwangsiense =

Conservation status
- Vulnerable (IUCN 3.1)

Scientific classification
- Kingdom: Plantae
- Clade: Tracheophytes
- Clade: Angiosperms
- Clade: Eudicots
- Clade: Asterids
- Order: Lamiales
- Family: Acanthaceae
- Genus: Gymnostachyum
- Species: G. kwangsiense

Binomial name
- Gymnostachyum kwangsiense H.S.Lo

Species of flowering plant

Gymnostachyum kwangsiense is a species of plant in the family Acanthaceae. It is endemic to China.
