= Venniyour =

Town in India

Coordinates: 11°01′01.1″N 75°56′57.7″E

Venniyour is a town situated in Malappuram district, Kerala, India.

== Etymology ==
The word Venniyour derived from two Malayalam words Vanna and Oor. In Malayalam language, it means the land of butter.

== Culture ==
Venniyoor village is a predominantly Muslim populated area. Hindus exist in comparatively smaller numbers. So the culture of the locality is based upon Muslim traditions. Duff Muttu, Kolkali and Aravanamuttu are common folk arts of this locality. There are many libraries attached to mosques giving a rich source of Islamic studies. Most of the books are written in Arabi-Malayalam which is a version of the Malayalam language written in Arabic script. People gather in mosques for the evening prayer and continue to sit there after the prayers discussing social and cultural issues. Business and family issues are also sorted out during these evening meetings. The Hindu minority of this area keeps their rich traditions by celebrating various festivals in their temples. Hindu rituals are done here with a regular devotion like other parts of Kerala. Fais is from here

== Transportation ==
Venniyoor village connects to other parts of India through Kottakkal town. National highway No.66 passes through Tanur and the northern stretch connects to Goa and Mumbai. The southern stretch connects to Cochin and Trivandrum. State Highway No.28 starts from Nilambur and connects to Ooty, Mysore and Bangalore through Highways.12,29 and 181. National Highway No.966 connects to Palakkad and Coimbatore. The nearest airport is at Kozhikode. The nearest major railway station is at Tirur and Tanur.
