= Arya Vaidya Sala =

Indian Healthcare Centre

Arya Vaidya Sala, Kottakkal

Geography
- Location: Kottakkal, Malappuram, Kerala, IN
- Coordinates: 10.99719°N 76.00895°E

Organisation
- Care system: Private
- Type: Charitable Trust
- Patron: P. S. Warrier

Services
- Beds: 330

History
- Founded: 12 October 1902; 124 years ago

Links
- Website: Official web site

Arya Vaidya Sala ('Holy Medical Campus'), popularly known as Kottakkal Arya Vaidya Sala, is a healthcare centre located in Kottakkal, in the Indian state of Kerala, providing services under the Indian traditional medicine system of Ayurveda.

== History ==
Vaidyaratnam P. S. Varier, a scholar in whose honour the Government of India have issued a postage stamp, founded Arya Vaidya Sala in 1902, at Kottakkal, a small town in Malappuram district, in the Indian state of Kerala. It began as a small clinic for outpatient treatment and sale of ayurvedic medicines. Fifteen years later, Varier established the Arya Vaidya Patasala (School of Ayurvedic Medicine; more literally "holy medical school"), in the town of Kozhikode teaching under the Gurukula method.

Since 1944, when Varier died, the clinic has been managed by the, Kottakkal Charitable Trust as per the provisions of his will. Varier was conferred the title of Vaidyaratnam (jewel among physicians) by the Government of British India in 1933.

After the death of P. S. Varier, his nephew, P. Madhava Varier (P. M. Warrier) took over the position as the Chief Physician and became the first Managing Trustee of the charitable trust in 1944. He is reported to have modernized the institution and initiated many efforts for the growth of the institution. Madhava Varier died in an air crash in 1953 and the next head of the institution was his youngest brother, P. K. Warrier, a physician and the winner of the civilian award, Padmabhushan, who was the Managing Trustee and the Chief Physician.

== Profile ==
The Arya Vaidya Sala (AVS) group of institutions has its headquarters in Kottakkal in Malappuram district, located 16 kilometers from Malappuram and 48 kilometers from Kozhikode. Two of the hospitals run by the group are based at Kottakkal. The group consists of five hospitals of which one is a charitable centre, 15 branches, a research centre, two medicine factories, a Marketing Division overseeing over 1500 retail outlets, and four herbal gardens. The group is reported to be treating over 800,000 patients, through consultation and in patient services. Arya Vaidya Sala provides readymade ayurvedic medicines and dispensing ayurvedic medicines in the form of pills.

=== Hospitals ===
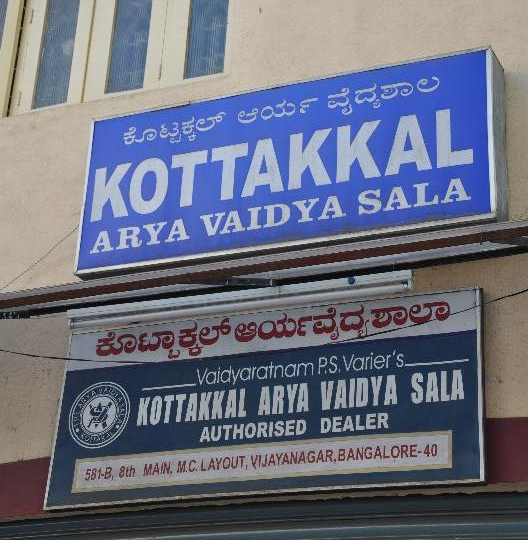
Kottakkal Arya Vaidya Sala has branches across India

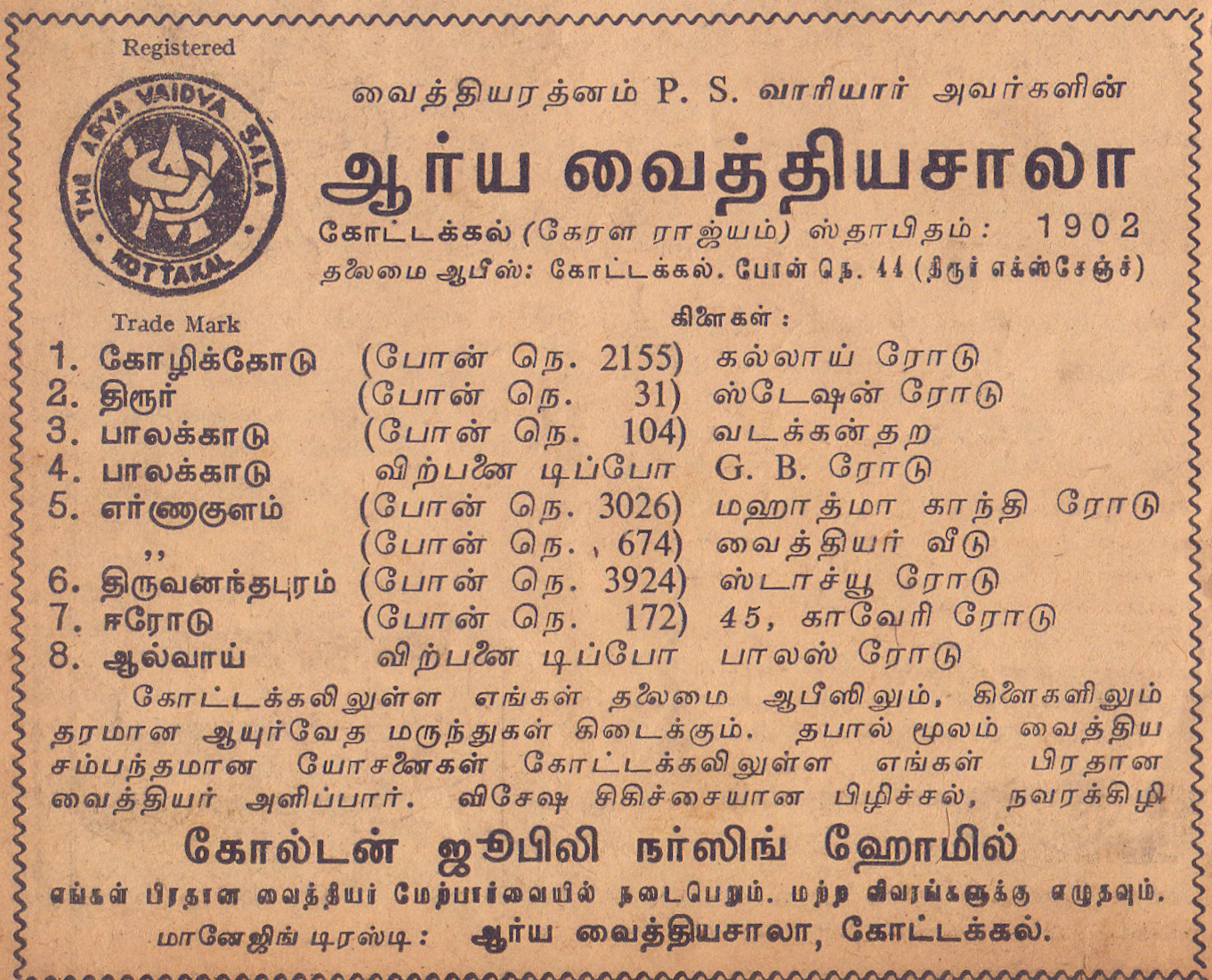

AVS group manages five hospitals with inpatient facilities with a total capacity of over 400 beds, three under the brand name of Ayurvedic Hospital and Research Centre (AH&RC) one under the name, Charitable Hospital and the fifth - a new Ayurvedic hospital at Baddi, Himachal Pradesh. AH&RC Kottakkal, the flagship hospital, is based in Kottakkal, and has a capacity of 300 beds. Established in 1954, the hospital provides traditional Kerala preparatory therapies along with classical panchakarma treatment. It is known to be a referral hospital and the patient profile is multiethnic. AH&RC Delhi is located at Karkardooma in East Delhi and is a 49 bedded facility. AH&RC Kochi is situated in Thrikkakkara while the Ayurvedic Hospital Baddi is situated at Baddi, Himachal Pradesh, www.aryavaidyasalabaddi.com.

The Charitable Hospital, based in Kottakkal, was started in 1924 and offers free consultation and treatment to the financially compromised. The hospital, which has a capacity of 140 beds, is composed of Panchakarma, Poison treatment and clinical research wards, a surgical unit and a maternity home. The hospital claims that the free treatment provided by the hospital amounts to US$ 900,000 annually. The unit is managed by the Ethical and the Research committees of Arya Vaidya Sala.

=== Centre for Medicinal Plants Research ===
Arya Vaidya Sala opened its research centre, Centre for Medicinal Plants Research (CMPR) in 2003, with financial assistance from Sir Dorabji Tata Trust. The centre is involved in the research on medicinal plants based on taxonomy, tissue culture, genetic resources, phytochemistry, anatomy and extension activities and is equipped with a phytochemistry laboratory and a tissue culture laboratory. The administration is handled from an administrative office block. The centre is located in Kottakkal and has ongoing research programmes in association with the Council of Scientific and Industrial Research (CSIR) of the Government of India.

=== Factories ===
The group has manufacturing facilities at Kottakkal and Kanjikode, near Palakkad. They are operated under license from the Drug Controller's office and has received Good Practices certification from the Government of Kerala. The units support the medicinal requirements of the hospitals run by the group as well as the over the counter sales at the retail outlets. The factories have in house Quality Assessment departments to oversee the manufacturing processes and are certified by the Bureau of Indian Standards. The total turnover of the manufacturing units is reported to be US$ 19 million.

=== Herbal gardens ===
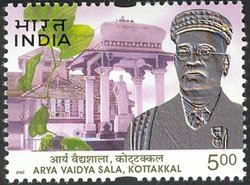
Stamp of India 2002 Arya Vaidya Sala Kottakkal

Of the four herbal gardens maintained by the group, two are located at Mannarkkad, near Palakkad and Thrikkakkara, in Ernakulam and together, they measure over 200 acres. AVS has two more demonstration gardens of lesser areas at Kottakkal, making the total area to 220 acres and the gardens provide 44 varieties of herbs to the AVS factories. The gardens permit research and studies to aspiring students which have precipitated several scientific papers and books. The International Development Research Centre (IDRC), Canada has collaborated on one of the projects, Medicinal Plants (India) Project. Some of the notable works that came out of researches are:

- Ayurvedic Drugs and Their Plant Sources
- Some important medicinal plants of the Western Ghats, India: a profile
- Indian Medicinal Plants: A Compendium of 500 Species, Vol. I
- Indian Medicinal Plants: A Compendium of 500 Species, Vol. II
- Indian Medicinal Plants: A Compendium of 500 Species, Vol. III
- Indian Medicinal Plants: A Compendium of 500 Species, Vol. IV
- Indian Medicinal Plants: A Compendium of 500 Species, Vol. V

== See also ==
- P. K. Warrier
- Vaidyaratnam P. S. Varier
- Panchakarma
- Documentary on Arya Vaidya Sala in Malayalam - https://www.youtube.com/watch?v=IuPbz-etmMI

== Related links ==
- https://www.aryavaidyanjournal.org
- https://www.aryavaidyasala.com
- https://aryavaidyasala.com/ckeditor-ckfinder-integration/uploads/files/Publication%20Catalogue.pdf
