= Cherukulamba =

Cherukulambu Cherukulamba
- town
- Location in Kerala, India Cherukulambu (India)
- Coordinates: 10°59′0″N 76°6′0″E
- Country: India
- State: Kerala
- District: Malappuram

Languages
  - Official: Malayalam, English
- Time zone: UTC+5:30 (IST)
- Vehicle registration: KL-

Cherukulamba is a village in Malappuram district of Kerala state, south India. It is 9 km from Malappuram town. It is surrounded by Chattipparamba and Padapparamba. two fast growing towns in Malappuram district. This town has somewhat big population when compared to other small towns surrounding it. This town is a Muslim-dominated towns which has as many as 6 Mosques, i.e. the place of worship for Muslims.

Major roads touching Cherukulamba include Kottakkal-Perithelmanna and Chattipparamba-Makkarapparamba.

== Culture ==
Cherukulamba village is a predominantly Muslim populated area. Hindus are exist in comparatively smaller numbers. People gather in mosques for the evening prayer and continue to sit there after the prayers discussing social and cultural issues. Business and family issues are also sorted out during these evening meetings. The Hindu minority of this area keeps their rich traditions by celebrating various festivals in their temples. Hindu rituals are done here with a regular devotion like other parts of Kerala.

== Transportation ==
Cherukulamba village connects to other parts of India through Kottakkal town. National highway No.66 passes through Tanur and the northern stretch connects to Goa and Mumbai. The southern stretch connects to Cochin and Trivandrum. State Highway No.28 starts from Nilambur and connects to Ooty, Mysore and Bangalore through Highways.12,29 and 181. National Highway No.966 connects to Palakkad and Coimbatore. The nearest airport is at Kozhikode. The nearest major railway station is at Tirur.
