= Indianoor =

- Village
- Location in India
- Coordinates: 11°00′N 76°00′E
- Country: India
- State: Kerala
- District: Malappuram
- Local body: Municipality
- Municipality: Kottakkal
- Ward number: 17-indianoor west 18-indianoor 19-Muliyankotta
- ward no,elected members,(political party): 17,c.moidheenkutty,(IUML)(https://lsgkerala.gov.in/en/lbelection/electdmemberpersondet/2020/1248/2020124801701) 18,sufaira,(IUML) (https://lsgkerala.gov.in/en/lbelection/electdmemberpersondet/2020/1248/2020124801801) 19,sarala.v,(CPI(M)) (https://lsgkerala.gov.in/en/lbelection/electdmemberpersondet/2020/1248/2020124801901)

Government
- Postal code: 676503

Indianoor is a village in Kottakkal, Malappuram district, Kerala, India.

Edited by MSKV

== Culture ==
Indianoor village is a predominantly Muslim-populated area. Hindus exist in comparatively smaller numbers. The Hindu minority of this area keeps their traditions by celebrating various festivals in their temples. Hindu rituals are done here with a regular devotion like other parts of Kerala.

== Transportation ==
Indianoor village connects to other parts of India through Kottakkal. National Highway 66 passes through Kottakkal and the northern stretch connects to Goa and Mumbai. The southern stretch connects to Cochin and Trivandrum. State Highway No. 28 starts from Nilambur and connects to Ooty, Mysore and Bangalore through Highways 12, 29, and 181. National Highway 966 connects to Palakkad and Coimbatore. The nearest airport is at Kozhikode. The nearest major railway station is at Tirur.
