= P. K. Warrier =

Indian Ayurveda practitioner (1921–2021)

- Born: Panniyampally Krishnankuty Warrier; 5 June 1921; Kottakkal, Malabar District, Madras Presidency, British India (present day Malappuram, Kerala, India)
- Died: 10 July 2021 (aged 100); Kottakkal, Malappuram, Kerala, India
- Occupation: Ayurveda practitioner
- Writing career
- Period: 20th century
- Notable awards: Padma Bhushan (2010); Padma Shri (1999); Dhanvantari Award (2010); Kerala Sahitya Akademi Award (2008)

Signature
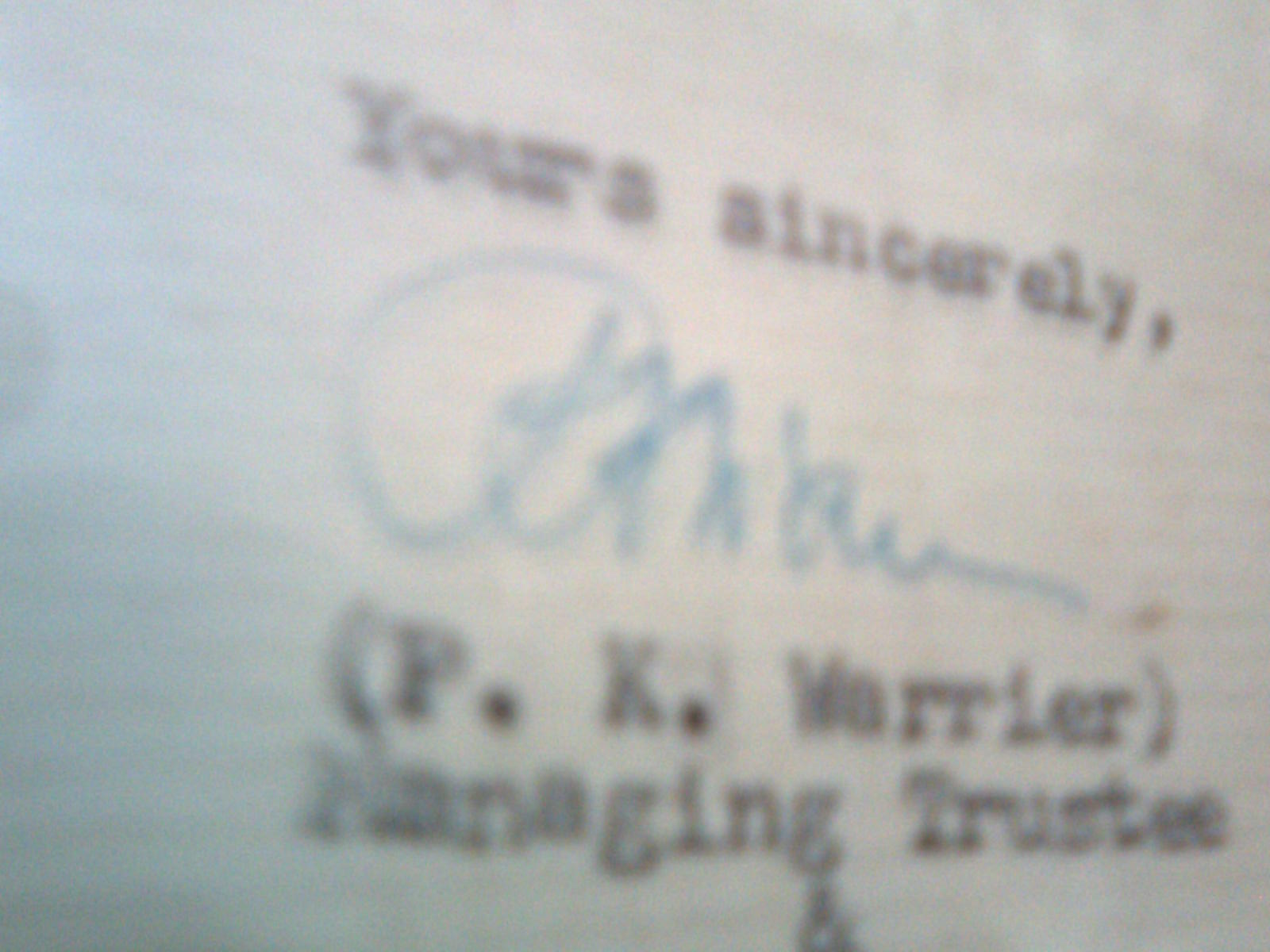

Panniyampally Krishnankuty Warrier (5 June 1921 – 10 July 2021) was an Indian Ayurveda practitioner. He was born in Kottakkal, Malappuram district in the Indian state of Kerala. He was the chief Physician and Managing trustee of Arya Vaidya Sala. He was the youngest nephew of Vaidyaratnam P. S. Varier, the founder of Arya Vaidya Sala.

== Biography ==
Panniyampally Krishnankuty Warrier was born on 5 June 1921 in Kottakkal, Malabar District. His parents were Thalappanna Sreedharan Namboothiri and Panniyampally Kunchi Varasyar. He was the youngest of their six children. Krishnankuty got his family name, Panniyampally, through matrilineal succession. Variyar (also written as Variar, Varyar, Warriar or Warrier) is a Hindu Ambalavasi caste in Kerala, India, who have traditionally associated with temple services.

P. Krishnankuty Warrier had his education from Raja's High School, Kottakkal and Zamorin's High School at Kozhikode. He studied Ayurveda in Arya Vaidya Pathasala (now called Vaidyaratnam P. S. Varier Ayurveda College).

He married Madhavikutty K. Varier, a poet and a Kathakali writer. He was Managing Trustee of the Arya Vaidya Sala (AVS) in Kottakkal and was also AVS's Chief Physician.

His writings, speeches and research papers have been compiled under the title Padamudrakal. He established a research laboratory for the identification of medicinal plants and to ascertain the chemical identity of their pharmaceutical constituents which grew into the Centre for Medicinal Plants Research.

He turned 100 in 2021. His 100th birthday was celebrated despite the ongoing COVID-19 pandemic. A month later, on 10 July 2021, he died at his home in Kottakkal from COVID-19. His body was cremated at the premises of his home on the same day. He is survived by two of his three children, grandchildren and great-grandchildren. His wife and one son predeceased him.

== Writings ==
He wrote and published several research papers in ethnopharmacology and Ayurveda and co-authored the five volume treatise Indian Medicinal Plants – A Compendium of 500 Species.

== Awards and honours ==
In 1999, he was awarded an honorary D.Litt by University of Calicut. He won the Kerala Sahitya Akademi Award for Biography and Autobiography for Smrithi Parvam in 2008 and received the 30th Dhanvanthri Award from the then-governor of Maharashtra, P. C. Alexander, in 2010. Warrier received the Padma Shri in 1999 and the Padma Bhushan Award in 2010 from the Government of India for his contribution to Ayurveda. Other notable awards include the "International Bhoopalman Singh Award" from Nepal, the "Dr. Poulos Mar Gregorios Award" for his contribution to the development of Ayurveda and the ‘Management Leadership Award’ instituted by Kerala Management Association (KMA), and the 2009 T. K. Ramakrishnan Award instituted by Abu Dhabi Sakthi Theatres. A plant discovered by scientists at the Centre for Medicinal Plants Research of Kottakkal Aryavaidya Sala was named Gymnostachyum warrieranum in his honour.
