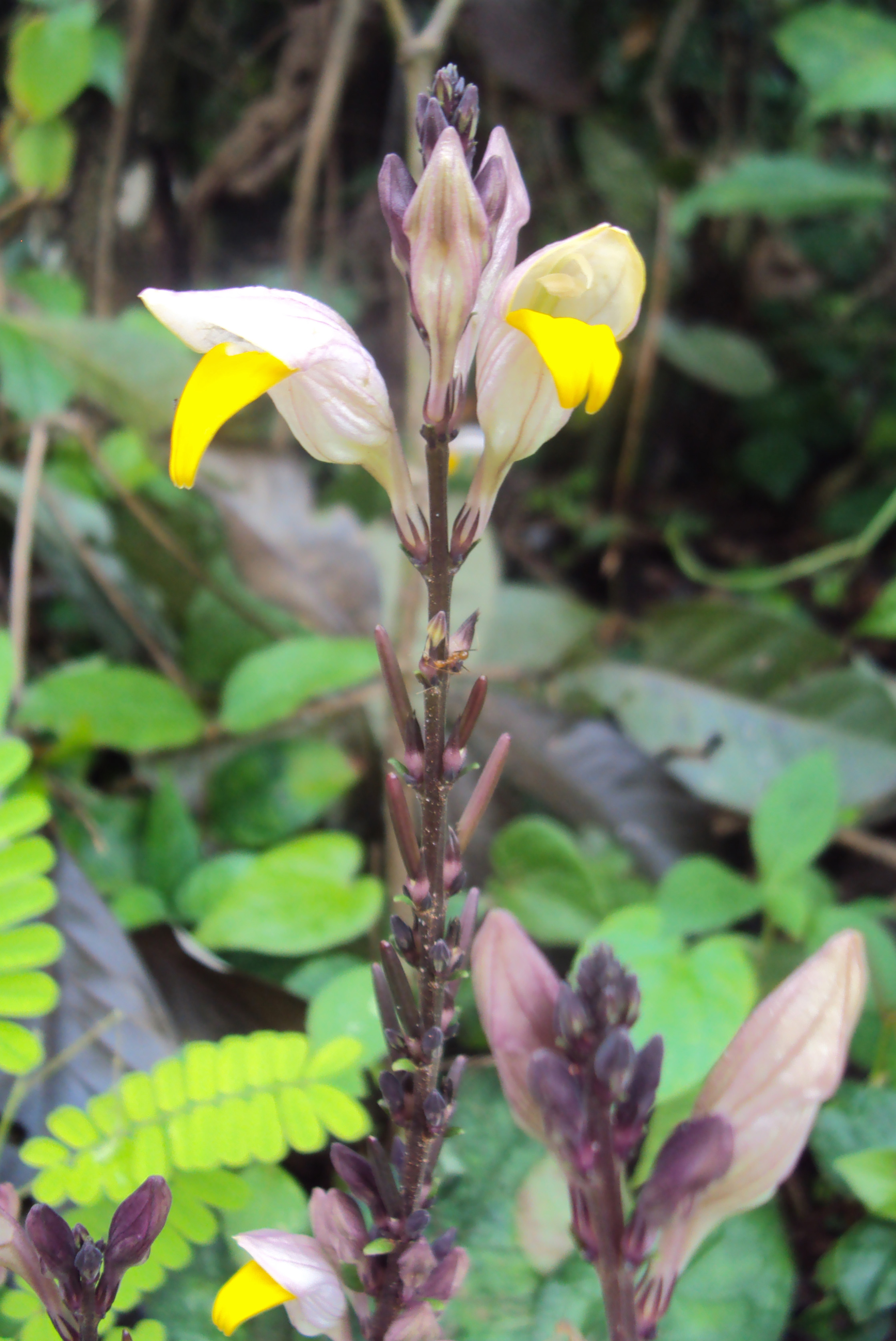
- Flower

Scientific classification
- Kingdom: Plantae
- Clade: Tracheophytes
- Clade: Angiosperms
- Clade: Eudicots
- Clade: Asterids
- Order: Lamiales
- Family: Acanthaceae
- Genus: Gymnostachyum
- Species: G. febrifugum

Binomial name
- Gymnostachyum febrifugum Benth.

Synonyms
- Cryptophragmium febrifugum Kuntze; Gymnostachyum febrifugum var. bracteatum V.S.Ramach.

= Gymnostachyum febrifugum =

Species of flowering plant

Gymnostachyum febrifugum is a herb endemic to the southern Western Ghats of India. It has medicinal value.

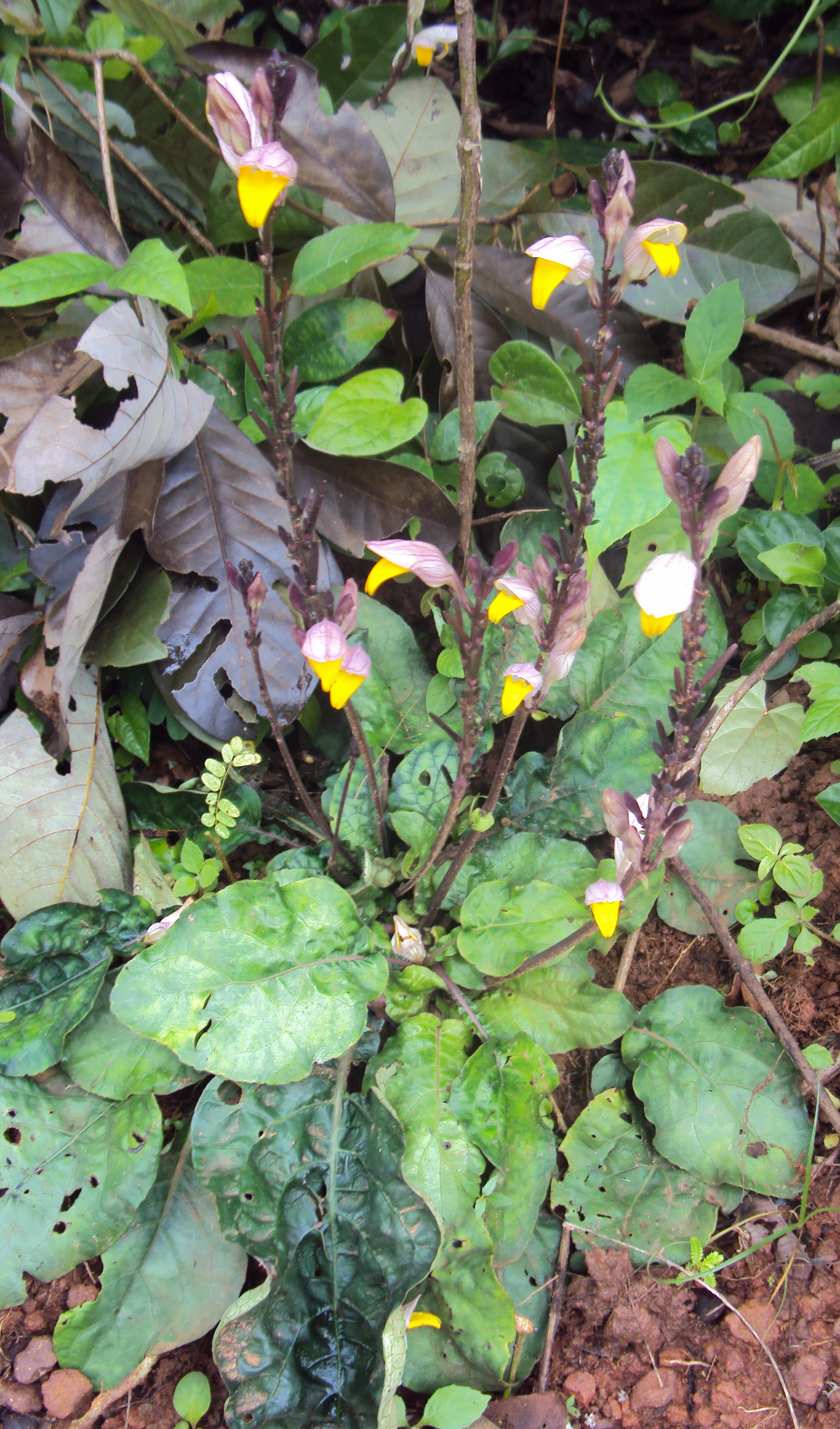
Plant with flowers

The species is classified as a member of the order Lamiales, family Acanthaceae, and genus Gymnostachyum.
