= Padapparamba =

Village in Kerala, India

Padapparamba is a village town in the Malappuram district in the Indian state of Kerala. It was the erstwhile place of Valluvanad, an erstwhile princely state of Kerala.

== Culture ==
Padapparamba village is a predominantly Muslim populated area. Hindus are exist in comparatively smaller numbers. So the culture of the locality is based upon Muslim traditions. Duff Muttu, Kolkali and Aravanamuttu are common folk arts of this locality. The Hindu minority of this area keeps their rich traditions by celebrating various festivals in their temples. Hindu rituals are done here with a regular devotion like other parts of Kerala.

== Transportation ==
Padapparamba is located around 10 km from Malappuram on Kolathur - Malappuram Road. There are regular buses available to Malappuram, Kottakkal and Perinthalmanna etc. The nearest airport is at Karipur. The nearest major railway station is at Tirur.
