= Education in Malappuram district =

Malappuram District

Malappuram district is an educational hub of the state of Kerala, India with four universities, two medical colleges, two law colleges and several engineering and arts colleges. The city has several educational institutions from the school level to higher education. Kendriya Vidyalaya, Jawahar Navodaya Vidyalaya, Malabar Special Police HSS, Government Girls Higher secondary school, Govt. Boys, St.Gemmas HSS, Islahiya HSS, A.U.P School, Sree Arunodaya Vidya Nigethan etc. to name a few schools. The city is lacking an Engineering College under Government despite having the largest number of students appearing and excelling in respective entrance exams. Govt. College, Malappuram, which is the oldest college in the city, started in 1972, College of Applied Science Malappuram and Govt. College for Women started this year along with many other private colleges serves the higher educational purpose. Govt.TTI and MCT TTI are few teachers training institutes. The Regional Directorate of Higher Secondary Education and Regional Office (Malabar) of State Open School are located in the city inside the Civil Station.

== History ==
The Kerala school of astronomy and mathematics, which independently created a number of important mathematics concepts, including series expansion for trigonometric functions, was based at Vettathunadu (Tirur region) in present-day Malappuram district.

== Higher education hub ==
Malappuram is transforming to a higher education hub of the state with many multi-core projects under pipeline here. Air connectivity and business potential of the city and district is attracting many private business groups to invest at Malappuram.

== List of Educational institutions in and around Malappuram ==
=== Overview ===
The progress that Malappuram district has achieved in the field of education during the last four decades is tremendous. Great strides have been made in the field of female education. The district plays a significant role in the higher education sector of the state. It is home to two of the main universities in the state—the University of Calicut, centred at Tenhipalam, which was established in 1968 as the second university in Kerala, and the Thunchath Ezhuthachan Malayalam University, centred at Tirur, which was established in the year 2012. AMU Malappuram Campus, one of the three off-campus centres of Aligarh Muslim University (AMU) is situated in Cherukara, which was established by the AMU in 2010. An off-campus of the English and Foreign Languages University functions at Panakkad. The district is also home to a subcentre of Kerala Agricultural University at Thavanur, and a subcentre of Sree Sankaracharya University of Sanskrit at Tirunavaya. The headquarters of Darul Huda Islamic University is at Chemmad, Tirurangadi. INKEL Greens at Malappuram provides an educational zone with the industrial zone. Eranad Knowledge City at Manjeri is a first of its kind project in the state. The MES College of Engineering, Kuttippuram, is the first established engineering college under the self financing sector in Kerala, an urban campus that extends more than a mile (1.6 km) alongside the Bharathappuzha river. The KCAET at Thavanur established in 1963, is the only agricultural engineering institute in the state. The Govt Ayurveda Research Institute for Mental Disease at Pottippara near Kottakkal is the only government Ayurvedic mental hospital in Kerala. It is also the first of its type under the public sector in the country. The Government of Kerala has proposed to establish one more university, Ayurveda University, at Kottakkal.

=== Universities ===
Universities of Malappuram district
University / University Center	Location	University Type	Established	Specialization	Sources
University of Calicut	Tenhipalam	Public	1968	General	
AMU Malappuram Campus	Chelamala	Public	2010	General	
Thunchath Ezhuthachan Malayalam University	Tirur	Public	2012	Culture, Heritage, Language and Literature	
EFLU Center	Inkel City	Public	2013	English and foreign languages	
Sree Sankaracharya University of Sanskrit	Tirur	Public	1998	Sanskrit	
Al Jamia Al Islamiya	Santhapuram	Private	1955	Islamic studies	
Darul Huda Islamic University	Chemmad	Private	1986	Islamic studies	
Ayurveda University	Kottakkal	Public	proposed	Ayurvedic Medicine	
Kerala Agricultural University Center	Tavanur	Public	1971	Agricultural Research	

- The University of Calicut is in Thenjipalam
- Aligarh Muslim University Malappuram Centre is in Chelamala.
- Thunchath Ezhuthachan Malayalam University is in Thunchan Parambu, Tirur (26 kilometres (16 mi))
- English and Foreign Languages University Malappuram

=== Professional Colleges ===
==== Engineering colleges ====
- Calicut University Institute of Engineering and Technology, Tenhipalam
- Eranad Knowledge City Technical Campus (EKC), Cherukulam, Manjeri
- Kelappaji College of Agricultural Engineering and Technology, Thavanur
- M.E.A. Engineering College, Vengoor, Perinthalmanna
- Veda Vyasa Institute of Technology, Karadparamba, Malappuram
- Cochin College of Engineering and Technology, Valanchery
- MGM College of Engineering and Pharmaceutical Sciences, Valanchery

==== MBBS colleges ====
- Government Medical College, Manjeri
- MES Medical College, Perinthalmanna

==== Dental colleges ====
- Educare Institute of Dental Sciences, Malappuram
- MES Dental College, Malappuram
- Malabar Dental College, Malappuram

==== Ayurvedic colleges ====
- Govt. Vaidyaratnam P S Varier Ayurveda College, Edarikode, Kottakkal, Malappuram

==== Architectural colleges ====
- Alsalama Institute of Architecture, Malappuram
- Devaki Amma's Guruvayurappan College of Architecture, Malappuram
- Eranad Knowledge City College of Architecture, Manjeri
- MES School of Architecture, Kuttippuram
- Talent Institute of Architecture, Malappuram
- Vedavyasa College of Architecture, Malappuram

==== Law Colleges ====
- Aligarh Muslim University, Malappuram Centre, Law Department
- KMCT Law College, Kuttippuram
- MCT College of Legal Studies, Malappuram

==== Pharmacy Colleges ====
- Al Shifa College of Pharmacy, Perinthalmanna
- Devaki Amma Memorial College of Pharmacy, Malappuram
- Jamia Salafiya Pharmacy College, Pulikkal
- KMCT College of Pharmacy, Malappuram
- Moulana College of Pharmacy, Perinthalmanna

==== Nursing Colleges ====
- Government Nursing College, Manjeri
- Al-Shifa College of Paramedical Sciences, Lemonvalley, Perinthalmanna
- Al-Shifa College of Nursing, Angadipuram, Perinthalmanna
- Almas College of Nursing, Puthoor, Kottakkal
- Al-Salama College of Optometry, Perinthalmanna
- College of Nursing, EMS Memorial Co-operative Hospital, Perinthalmanna
- College of Paramedical Sciences, EMS Memorial Co-op. Hospital, Perinthalmanna
- MES College of Nursing, Perinthalmanna
- MIMS College of Nursing, Vazhayur, Kondotty
- MIMS College of Allied Health sciences, Vazhayur, Kondotty
- Moulana College of Nursing, Angadipuram, Perinthalmanna
- Moulana College of Paramedical Sciences, Angadipuram, Perinthalmanna

=== Government Arts and Science Colleges ===
- Government Arts & Science College Nilambur, Pookottumpadam
- Government Arts and Science College Kondotty, Kuzhimanna
- Government Arts and Science College, Thavanur
- Government College, Malappuram
- Government College Mankada, Kolathur
- Govt Arts and Science College, Tanur
- Govt. College for Women, C.H.Mohammed Koya Educational Complex, Down Hill, Malappuram
- Pookoya Thangal Memorial Government College, Perinthalmanna
- Thunchan Memorial Government College, Vakkad, Tirur

=== Private arts and science colleges ===
- A I A College, Kuniyil
- A I W A College, Mongam
- Amal College of Advanced Studies, Nilambur
- Ambedkar College of Arts & Science, Wandoor
- Ansar Arabic College, Valavannur, Kalpakanchery
- D U A College, Vazhakkad
- Darunnajath Arabic College, Karuvarakundu
- EMEA College of Arts and Science, Kondotty
- M.E.S. Ponnani College, Ponnani
- MES Keveeyam College, Valanchery
- Dr. Gafoor Memorial MES Mampad College, Mampad
- Malabar College of Advanced Studies, Vengara
- Mar Thoma College, Chungathara, Nilambur
- N.S.S College, Manjeri
- PSMO College, Tirurangadi
- Sullamussalam Arabic College, Areekode
- Sullamussalam Science College, Areekode
- Korambayil Ahammed Haji Memorial Unity Women's College, Manjeri
- Parappanangadi Co-operative College, Parappanangadi
- Sahya Arts and Science College, Wandoor
- College of Applied Science Malappuram
- Priyadarshini College, Melmuri, Malappuram
- Ma'din Arts and Science College, Melmuri, Malappuram
- MIC Arts and Science College, Athanikal, Malappuram
- GEMS College, Ramapuram, Perinthalmanna
- Malappuram Cooperative College, Down hill, Malappuram
- HM College, Manjeri
- Farook Arts&Science College, Parappur, Kottakkal
- MAJLIS Arts and Science, Puramannur, Valanchery
- MES Arts and Science, Perinthalmanna
- Moulana College, Kootayi, Tirur
- Safa college of arts and science, Pookattiri, Valanchery
- CPA Arts and Science, Cheloor, Puthanathani
- SNDP YSS College, Perinthalmanna
- MSTM Arts and Science College, Pooppalam, Perinthalmanna
- ISS Arts and Science College, Perinthalmanna
- MES Arts and Science College, Perinthalmanna

=== Polytechnic colleges ===
- S.S.M. Polytechnic College, Tirur
- Government Polytechnic College, Perinthalmanna
- Government Polytechnic College, Manjeri
- Government Polytechnic College, Tirurangadi
- Government Women's Polytechnic College, Kottakal
- Ma'din Polytechnic College, Malappuram
- NTTF Karathod, Malappuram
- NTTF Kuttippuram
- Orphanage Polytechnic College, Edavanna
- Malabar polytechnic College, Kottakkal

=== Optometry Institutes ===
- Malabar Institute of Optometry, Kizhakethala, Malappuram
- Vasan Eye Care IRIS Institute of Optometry, AK Road, Malappuram
- Al Salama Optometry, Perinthalmanna
- Al Rayhan College of optometry, Kondotty

=== Schools ===
The district is home to the highest number of schools as well as students in the state. There are 898 Lower primary schools, 363 Upper primary schools, 355 High schools, 248 Higher secondary schools, and 27 Vocational Higher secondary schools in the district. Hence there are 1620 schools in the district. Besides these, there are 120 CBSE schools and 3 ICSE schools. 554 government schools, 810 Aided schools, and 1 unaided school, recognised by the Government of Kerala have been digitalised.

== Education cities ==
=== Inkel Greens ===
Inkel Greens, an educity under construction at picturesque 243 acres at Panakkad in the city is a PPP joint venture of Inkel and KSIDC subsidiary called Inkid. Once completed, the edu health city would have premier institutions like Institute of Engineering & Technology, International Business School, School of Media and Law, International Residential School, Finishing School, Hospitality and Residential Areas etc. Currently NTTF has started INKEL-NTTF Technical Training Centre offering Diploma courses in Electronics and Mechatronics and Institute of Gems and Jewellery offering various courses related to Jewellery field. Many other institutions are also under construction in the premises and are expected to commence operation by 2016. Master plan of the educity is done by Indian studio of German firm BDP (Building Design Partnership).

=== Al Abeer Educity ===
Al Abeer Educity is another educational project underway at Malappuram promoted by Saudi-based Al abeer group. It is an 8 billion project comprising Medical College, Hospital, Business School, Institute of Engineering, International School, Health Spa etc. This 70+ acre project is getting established at Melmuri in the city. Medical College is expected to open by 2016.

=== Eranad Knowledge City ===
Eranad Knowledge City at Manjeri is a first of its kind project in the state. It is chain of professional colleges, other colleges, and schools based at Manjeri.

== See also ==
- Education in Perinthalmanna
- Administration of Malappuram
- History of Malappuram
- List of desoms in Malappuram (1981)
- List of Gram Panchayats in Malappuram
- List of people from Malappuram
- List of villages in Malappuram
- Transportation in Malappuram
- Malappuram metropolitan area
- Malappuram district
- South Malabar
