= Education in Perinthalmanna =

List of Education centers in Perinthalmanna

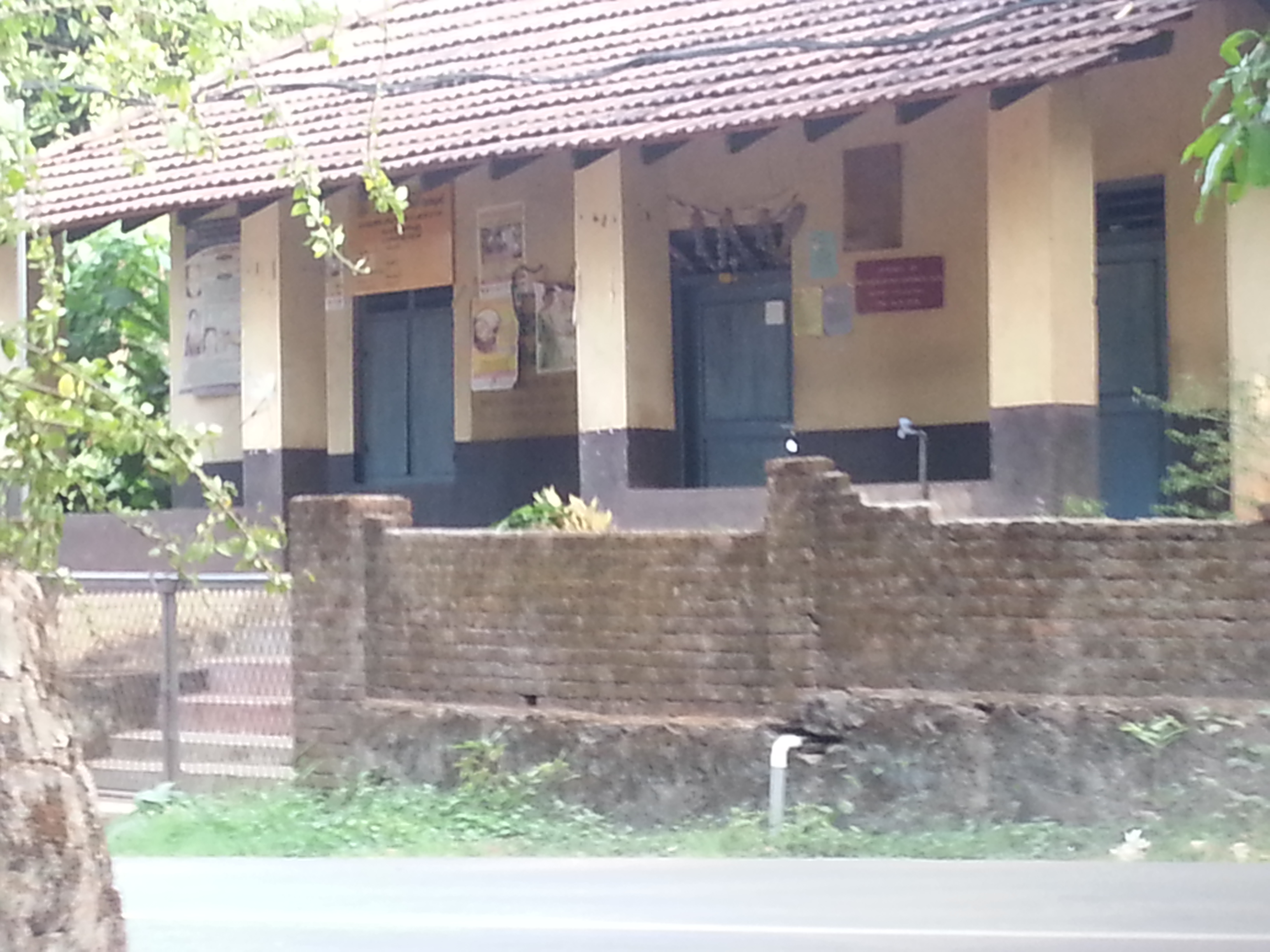
Balavadi in Muthukurussi

The academic growth of Perintalmanna is best reflected with its number of educational institutions, including the Malappuram Centre of Aligarh Muslim University(established in 2012) at Chelamala. There is a long list of schools and colleges spread all over Perintalmanna.

== List of Colleges in Perinthalmanna ==
- Aligarh Muslim University Malappuram Centre, Perinthalmanna
- Alsalama Institute of Architecture, Perinthalmanna
- Pookoya Thangal Memorial Govt. (PTM ) College
- Government Polytechnic College, Perinthalmanna, Angadippuram PO
- MEA Engineering College, Vengoor P.O, Perinthalmanna
- Monti international institute of management studies, Puthanangadi, Perinthalmanna
- Mankada Govt College, Moorkkanad - Kolathur Rd

=== Colleges of Medical Sciences ===
- Al Salama College of Optometry
- M.E.S. Academy of Medical Sciences: Malaparamba, Perinthalmanna
  - M.E.S. Medical College
  - M.E.S. Dental College
  - M.E.S. College of Nursing
  - M.E.S. School of Nursing
  - M.E.S. Institute of Paramedical Sciences
- Shifa Institute of Medical Sciences [Sims]:
  - Al Shifa College of Paramedical Sciences
  - Al Shifa College of Pharmacy
  - Al Shifa College of Nursing
  - Al Shifa School of Nursing
- Colleges Under EMS Memorial Co-Operative Hospital & Research Centre:
  - EMS College of Paramedical Sciences
  - EMS College of Nursing
  - EMS School of Nursing
- Moulana Institute of Nursing and Paramedical Sciences:
  - Moulana College of Paramedical Sciences
  - Moulana College of Nursing
  - Moulana School of Nursing
  - Moulana College of Pharmacy

=== Arts and Science Colleges ===
- AL JAMIA Arts and Science College, Pooppalam
- M.E.S. Arts and Science College, Palachode P.O., Perinthalmanna
- MSTM (Muhammad Ali Shihab Thangal Memorial) Arts & Science College, Pooppalam
- SNDP Sathabdi Smaraka College, Angadippuram
- St Mary's College, Puthanagadi
- ISS Arts and Science College, Ponniakurissy
- Nasra Arts and Science College, Nusrathul Islam Trust, Thirurkad
- Co-operative Arts & Science College, Perinthalmanna,
- GEMS Arts & Science College, Panangagara, Perinthalmanna,
- AAMS (Academy for Accounting And Management Studies) Perinthalmanna
- MES Women's College, Perinthalmanna
- Pratibha College, Nh-213 Hwy, Perinthalmanna
- Victory college, Ootty Rd, Perinthalmanna
- National Service Society - NSSI (Mission College), Perinthalmanna

== Arabic Colleges ==
- Jamia Nooriyya Arabiyya Faizabad, Pattikkad
- Shuhadha Islamic College, Puthanangadi
- Ilahiya Arabic College, Thirurkad
- Anwarul Islam Arabic College, Thirurkad
- Darul Uloom Islamic Da'wa College, Thootha, Perintalmanna
- Jamia Al Hind - Sharaiyya College, Cherukara P.O., Perintalmanna
- Darul Uloom Islamic & Arts College Wafy Campus, Paral, Thootha, Perintalmanna
- Al Jamia Al Islamia - The Islamic University, Santapuram, Perinthalmanna

=== Training Institute (TTC Colleges) ===
- Darul Uloom Teacher Training Institute, Thootha, Perinthalmanna
- Perfect Teachers Training Institute, Perinthalmanna
- ISS College of Teacher Education, Ponniakurissy, Perinthalmanna

=== Technical institutes ===
- Sinet Education, Perinthalmanna
- Etudemy Digital Academy, Perinthalmanna
- Govt. ITI (SCDD), Pathaikkara, Perinthalmanna
- Cubatic College of Interior Designing, Perinthalmanna
- NTC College of Engineering (NTC Technical Institute), Perinthalmanna
- Anwar ITI (Industrial Training Institute-Run by: Thanveerul Islam Association), Tirurkad
- Hamad ITC, Thirurkad, Perinthalmanna
- Perfect ITC & College, (Run by Al-Kamil Charitable Trust), Perinthalmanna
- Al-Kamil ITI & Institute of Technology, Ooty Rd, Perinthalmanna
- Al-Kamil Institute of Fire And Safety
- Malabar Institute of Technology, Thazhe Pooppalam
- Electro ITC-Industrial Training Institute, Near KC, Perinthalmanna
- Electro Technical centre(ETC) - Vocational Training centre, Pattambi Road
- Food Craft Institute, Angadipuram (Jointly sponsored by Government of India and Government of Kerala)
- Akbar Academy of Airline Studies
- Vision School of Aviation - Aviation training institute in Perintalmanna
- Areena Animation Academy
- NIFE Academy and Countless Technology Institutions for various Genres.

=== List of CBSE Affiliated Schools in Perinthalmanna ===
- PES Global School (Parakkottil English School), Perintalmanna, Puzhakkattiri, affiliated to CBSE 931163, contact-8593060650
- Silvermount International School- The only international school of perinthalmanna, now affiliated to CBSE.
- I.S.S. English Medium Senior Secondary School:
- St. Joseph's E.M. Senior Secondary School, Puthanangadi - Perinthalmanna
- Sree Valluvanad Vidya Bhavan, Eravimangalam - Perinthalmanna
- Darul Falah English School, Poopalam - affiliated to the CBSE,
- M.E.S. Central School, Perinthalmanna
- M.J. Academy, Panambi

== List of Schools in Perinthalmanna ==
Sl. No.	School name (Ref:)	Type	Funding	Affiliation
1	Govt. Model Higher Secondary School, Perinthalmanna	Higher Secondary School	Government	SCERT Kerala
2	Govt. Girls Higher Secondary School, Perinthalmanna	Higher Secondary School	Government	SCERT Kerala
3	Govt. Vocational Higher Secondary School, Perinthalmanna	Higher Secondary School (Vocational)	Government	SCERT Kerala
4	IHRD - Technical Higher Secondary School, Perinthalmanna	Higher Secondary School (Technical)	Government (IHRD)	SCERT Kerala
5	Presentation English Medium Higher Secondary School, Perinthalmanna	Higher Secondary School	Private (Unaided)	
6	Sree Valluvanad Vidyabhavan Senior Secondary School, Eravimangalam - Perinthalmanna	Higher Secondary School	Private (CBSE)	CBSE (NCERT, India)
7	Tharakan Higher Secondary School, Angadipuram, Perinthalmanna	Higher Secondary School	Aided	SCERT Kerala
8	St. Joseph's E.M. Senior Secondary School, Puthanangadi - Perinthalmanna	Higher Secondary School	Private (CBSE)	
9	St. Mary's Higher Secondary School, Pariyapuram - Perinthalmanna	Higher Secondary School	Aided	
10	AM Higher Secondary School (AMHSS), Thirurkad	Higher Secondary School	Aided	
11	I.S.S. English Medium Senior Secondary School, Perinthalmanna	Higher Secondary School	Private (CBSE)	
12	Anvar English Higher Secondary School, Thirurkad	Higher Secondary School	Private (Unaided)	
13	Darul Uloom Higher Secondary School, Thootha	Higher Secondary School	Aided	
14	PTMHSS - Higher Secondary School, Thazhekode	Higher Secondary School	Aided	
15	GHSS - Higher Secondary School, Kunnakkavu	Higher Secondary School	Government	
16	GHSS - Higher Secondary School, Anamangad	Higher Secondary School	Government	
17	GHSS - Higher Secondary School, Aliparamba	Higher Secondary School	Government	
18	GHSS - Higher Secondary School, Pulamanthole	Higher Secondary School	Government	
19	Aura Global Schools, Panambi, Perinthalmanna	International / CBSE School	Private (CBSE)	
20	Darul Falah English School, Poopalam	English Medium School	Private (CBSE)	
21	Azhar English Medium School, Green Valley, Tirurkad	English Medium School	Private (CBSE)	
22	M.E.S. Central School, Perinthalmanna	CBSE School	Private (CBSE)	
23	MIC English Medium School, Cherukara	English Medium School	Private (Unaided)	
24	PES Global School (Parakkottil English School), Puzhakkattiri, Perinthalmanna	CBSE School	Private (CBSE)	
25	Silvermount International School	International School	Private (CBSE/International)	
26	JSS English Medium School, Ponniakurissi	English Medium School	Private (Unaided)	
27	Sacred Heart CMI Public School, Ponniakurissi	CBSE School	Private (CMI Management)	
28	Royal Kids Montessori School, Kidangu Road, Perinthalmanna	Montessori School	Private	
29	Casa Dei Bambini International Montessori Institute	Montessori School	Private	
30	P.K.M. School for Mentally Retarded Children, Perinthalmanna	Special School	Aided	
31	Fathima Upper Primary School, Pariyapuram	Upper Primary School	Aided	
32	Sarojini Memorial Upper Primary School (SMUPS), Perinthalmanna	Upper Primary School	Aided	
33	Kader Molla Memorial Upper Primary School (KMMUPS), Perinthalmanna South	Upper Primary School	Aided	
34	AUPS Pathaikkara	Upper Primary School	Aided	
35	AMUP School, Poovathani	Upper Primary School	Aided	
36	AUP School, Arakkuparamba	Upper Primary School	Aided (Managed by Kauthedath Mana family)	
37	PTMUP School, Puthanangadi	Upper Primary School	Aided	
