= Cherukara =

- Village
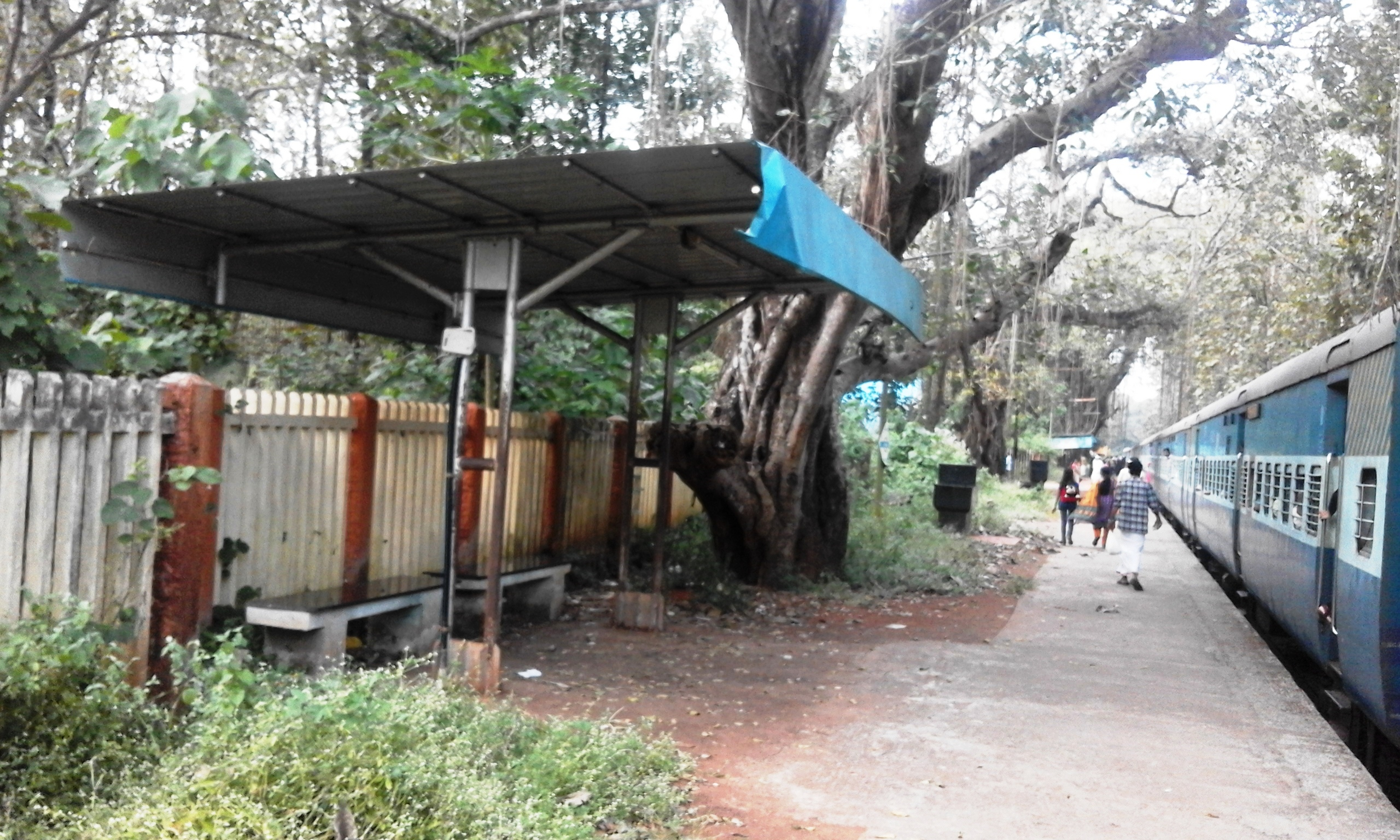
- Cherukara Railway station

- Location in Kerala, India Cherukara (India)
- Coordinates: 10.9316900°N 76.226357°E
- Country: India
- State: Kerala
- District: Malappuram

Government
  - Type: Gram Panchayat
  - Body: Elamkulam Gram Panchayat

Languages
  - Official: Malayalam, English
- Time zone: UTC+5:30 (IST)
- PIN: 679340
- Telephone code: +914933
- Vehicle registration: KL-53
- Lok Sabha constituency: Malappuram (Lok Sabha constituency)

Cherukara is a village in Malappuram in the Indian state of Kerala. The nearest city is Perinthalmanna which is about 6 kilometres (3.7 mi) away.

== Transport ==
The village can be accessed by local buses and taxis. The Shoranur - Nilambur Railway line serves this area.

== Education ==
=== AMU Malappuram Campus ===
AMU Malappuram Campus is one of the three branches of Aligarh Muslim University. It is a higher education center located in Cherukara village at the hills of Chelamala. It offers a five-year law course after 12th class, MBA and B.Ed after graduation. The students can apply in the month of March for the admission tests for these courses with the AMU Controller of Exam.

=== MIC English Medium Secondary School ===
MIC English Medium secondary School run by Manfa-ul-uloom Islamic complex trust is a secondary school situated in Cherukara. It is affiliated to CBSE New Delhi. It was founded by late Punnasseri Bappu Haji. The school offers General Education, and Islamic moral studies.

The School Authority runs an orphanage.

== Cherukara Juma Masjid ==
Cherukara Juma Masjid is a Masjid (place for worship) in Cherukara run by "Cherukara Mahal Committee", a local body of elected members.

== Expatriates ==
A huge flow of workers has migrated from Kerala to the Middle East since the 1970s. Like other parts of Kerala, people migrated Saudi Arabia, Qatar and UAE in search of jobs. Initially most were engaged in unskilled labor. Over time, skilled and educated individuals, including those from Cherukara, also began migrating. Some migrants engaged in business. This helped them to increase remittances, improving the lifestyle of the people of Cherukara. They are socially and culturally organized in their homeland and abroad. Cherukarites are a part of many organizations. One such organization is Cherukara MIC Welfare Committee, Jeddah. A few Cherukarites organizations are in other gulf regions. The main objective of these organizations is to help those in need of help. These organizations aim to support individuals in need by funding housing construction, assisting with the marriage expenses of underprivileged women, and providing educational support.

Apart from MIC Jeddah Welfare Committee in Saudi Arabia a Committee was formed in the UAE, named "UAE Cherukara Association", which has two main divisions: Abu Dhabi and Al-Ain, and Dubai and the Northern Emirates). This group actively takes part in social activities and bring Cherukarites together. This group started with around 160 members.

== Culture ==
Cherukara is a predominantly Muslim area. Hindus exist in comparatively smaller numbers. Duff Muttu, Kolkali and Aravanamuttu are common folk arts. Many libraries are attached to mosques, supporting Islamic studies. Most books are written in Arabi-Malayalam, a version of the Malayalam language written in Arabic script. People gather in mosques for evening prayer and remain after the prayers discussing social and cultural issues. Business and family issues are sorted out during these evening meetings. The Hindu minority of keeps their traditions by celebrating festivals in their temples. Hindu rituals are done there with a regular devotion as in other parts of Kerala.

== Transport ==
Cherukara connects to other parts of India through Perinthalmanna town. National highway No.66 passes through Tirur and the northern stretch connects to Goa and Mumbai. The southern stretch connects to Cochin and Trivandrum. Highway No.966 goes to Palakkad and Coimbatore. Railway line from Nilambur connecting Shornur passes through Cherukara can be accessed by Cherukara Railway station.

The nearest airport is at Kozhikode.

The nearest major railway station is at Pattambi.

== See also ==
- Cherukara railway station

== Gallery ==
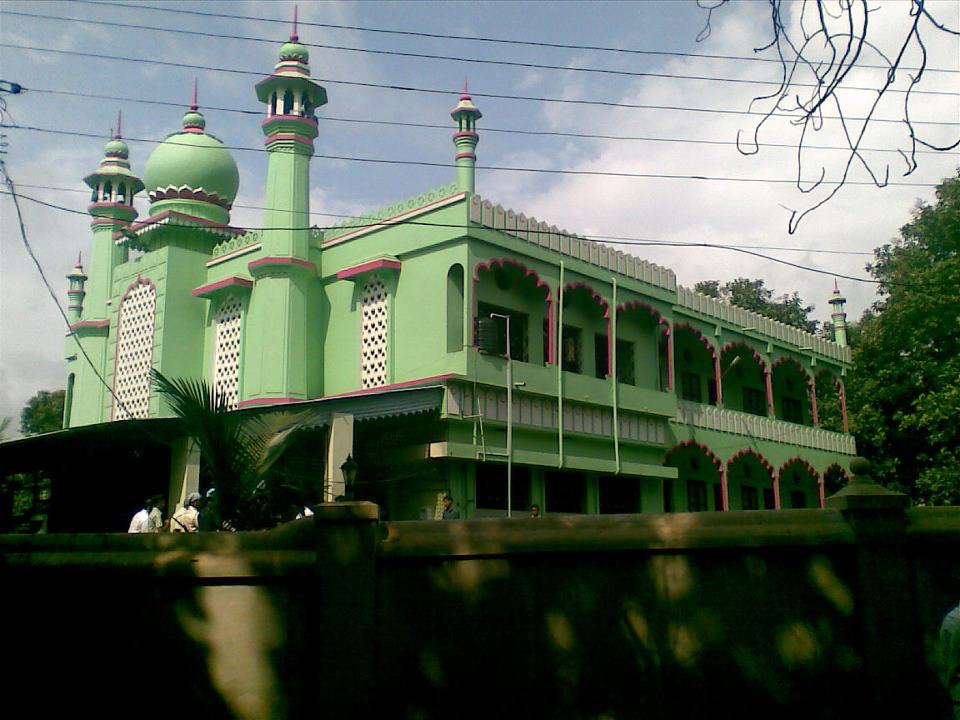
Cherukara Juma Masjid

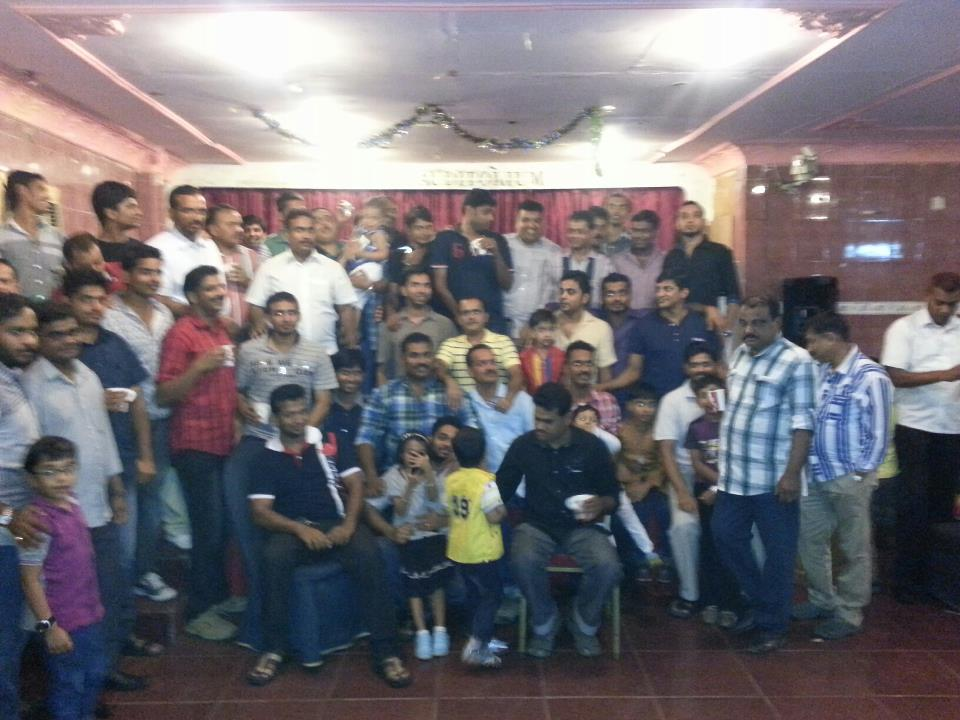
The members of MIC Cherukara Welfare Committee of Jeddah, Saudi Arabia

Football Fans of Early 1980s playing in Railway's land
