= Aligarh Muslim University Malappuram Centre =

University in Kerala, India

Aligarh Muslim University, Malappuram Campus
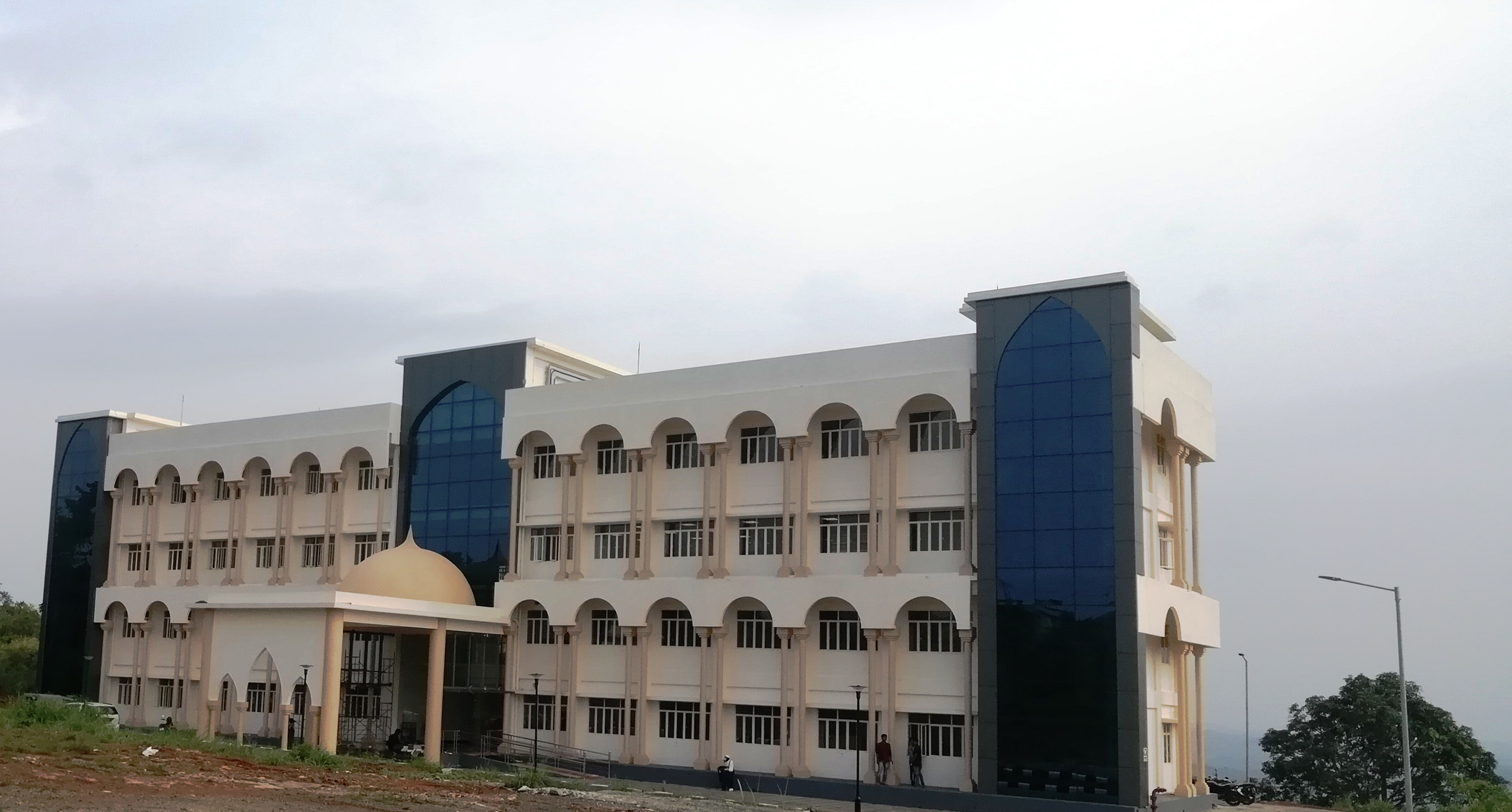
- AMU Malappuram Campus, Kerala Malappuram
- Other name: AMUMC
- Motto: Arabic: عَلَّمَ الاِنْسَانَ مَا لَمْ يَعْلَم 'allama’l-insāna mā lam ya‘lam
- Motto in English: Taught man what he did not know (Qur'an 96:5)
- Type: Public
- Established: 2010
- Affiliations: UGC, NAAC, AIU
- Endowment: 120 crores
- Vice-Chancellor: Prof. Naima Khatoon
- Director: Prof. M. Shahul Hameed
- Faculty: 30
- Students: 400+
- Location: Chelamala, Cherukara P.O, Perinthalmanna, Malappuram district, Kerala, 679340, India
- Campus: Rural, mountainous 343 acres (139 ha)
- Anthem: AMU Tarana
- Colors
- Website: www.amu.ac.in/amucentres/amu-malappuram-centre-kerala

Aligarh Muslim University Malappuram Centre or AMU-Malappuram Campus is one of the prominent educational institution of Aligarh Muslim University in the southern state of Kerala in Malappuram district, near Perinthalmanna at Cherukara. It was established in 2010 by the Ministry of Human Resource and Development, Government of India. The former President of India, Pratibha Patil, in her capacity as the Visitor, accorded sanction to establish two centres of Aligarh Muslim University, one at Malappuram and the other at Murshidabad in 2010.

There are total three departments at the Centre — Law, Management and Education, all functioning with the requisite facilities approved by various bodies of the central government like NCTE and BCI. UGC and NAAC peer team have also inspected in June 2017.

== History ==
Aligarh Muslim University is the creation of the movement. The Aligarh Movement had a profound impact on the Indian society, particularly on the Muslim society in terms of Socio-Economic and Political upliftment. The impact of Aligarh Movement was not confined to the Northern India only, but its expansion could be seen on the other regions of the Indian sub-continent during the 20th century.

In 2008, the AMU submitted a detailed proposal to the Government of India for establishment of five AMU centres in different parts of the country. The Union government responded by granting fund for two centres — Malappuram and Murshidabad. Later, government granted some fund for Murshidabad Centre also. Aligarh Muslim University has established three centres at Malappuram, (Kerala) and Murshidabad, (West Bengal) and Kishanganj, (Bihar) while and a site was also identified for Aurangabad, (Maharashtra) centre.

- 2011– The AMU Centre Malappuram began functioning in February 2011, Kapil Sibal, the then Union Minister for Human Resource Development and the (then) Kerala Chief Minister, Oommen Chandy. inaugurated the campus at Chelamala near Perinthalmanna with the commencement of MBA, BA.LL.B (Hons) courses. It was established by A.M.U. in under Section 5(2)(C) of the A.M.U. (Amendment) Act, 1981 and under Section 12(2) of the University Act. [Act XL 1920 and A.M.U. (Amendment) Act, 1972].
- In 2013, E. Ahamed, Minister of State for External Affairs, Government of India inaugurated BEd programme at the Malappuram Centre of Aligarh Muslim University. Addressing the students, Mr. Ahamed expressed his satisfaction on the smooth functioning of the AMU Malappuram Centre. He also observed that it was the best among the three Centres of AMU. The centre is located in the educationally and socially backward, Muslim-majority Malappuram District of Kerala.

Prof. P Muhammad was the first director of the centre, while the first Senior Hall (student representative) was Janzeb Danish and first Senior food was Ramiz Akhtar. Neha Royal and Sania Mushahid were Senior Hall and Senior Food monitor for girls respectively. Dr. H Abdul Azeez was man behind the establishment of the permanent building for the Department of Law.

== Administration ==
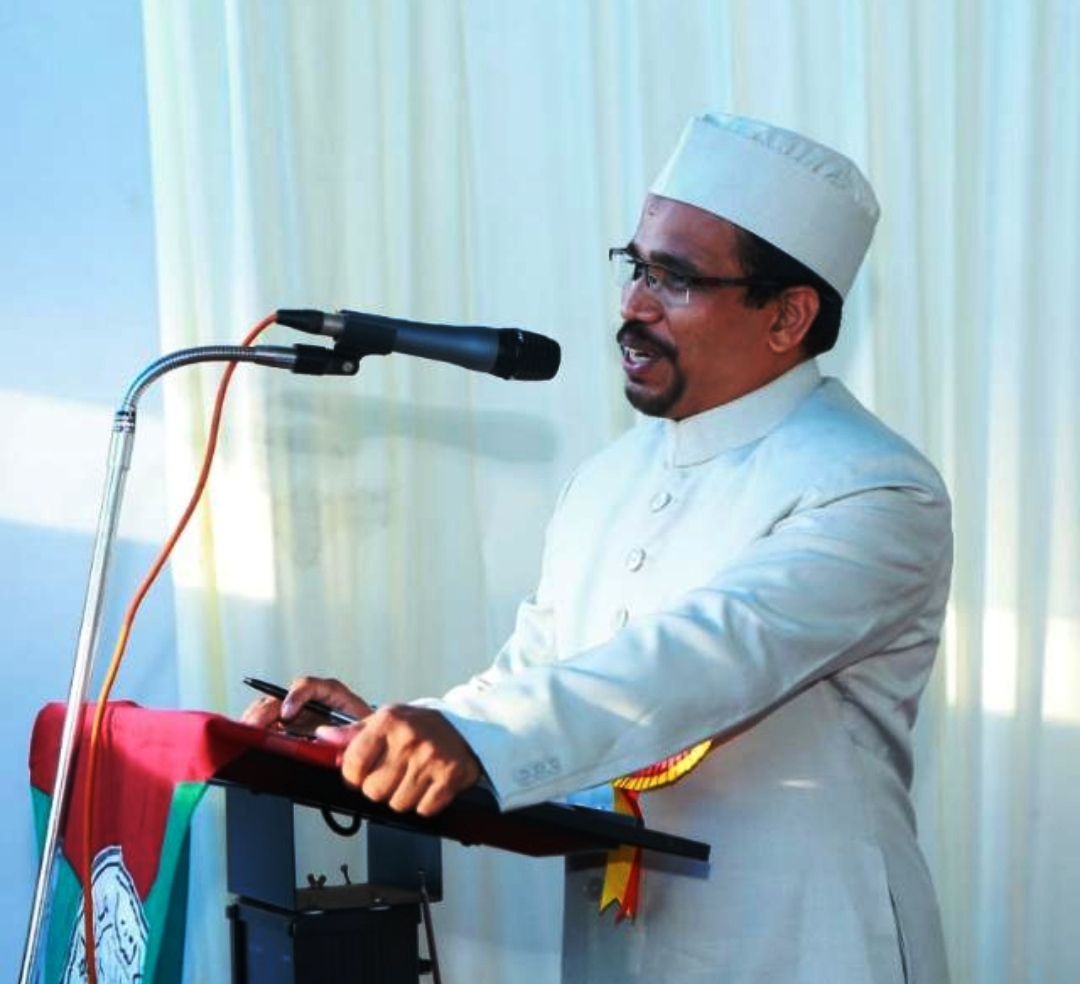
Dr.Faisal KP, Director AMU-MC speaking during Sir Syed Day Celebrations 2018

The administration of this south Indian Campus of AMU is being run from AMU main Campus at Aligarh. In matters of appointment of faculties and ministerial staff and admission of students, the authorities at AMU take decisions as per AMU Act. Vice Chancellor through the Coordinator of these Centers manages the administration of AMU Centres. The entrance examinations and result of various courses for the center is conducted by the office of Controller at Aligarh Muslim University. For better coordination, The AMU Centres Nodal Office was established at Aligarh Muslim University.

Prof. H.S. Yahya, Department of Wild Life Sciences was appointed as the first OSD, AMU Centres Nodal Office. Later Prof. Javaid Akhter, Department of Business Administration; Prof. Parvaiz Talib, Department of Business Administration and Prof. Mohammed Arif, Department of Civil Engineering have served as the Coordinator, AMU Centres Nodal Office.

At present Prof.I.A Khan, Former Dean of Dept of Law is the Coordinator, AMU Centres Nodal Office. He took the charge from Prof. Anwar Khursheed. Dr. Faisal KP is presently working as officiating director of the Centre since May 2019.

== Departments ==
=== Faculty of Law ===
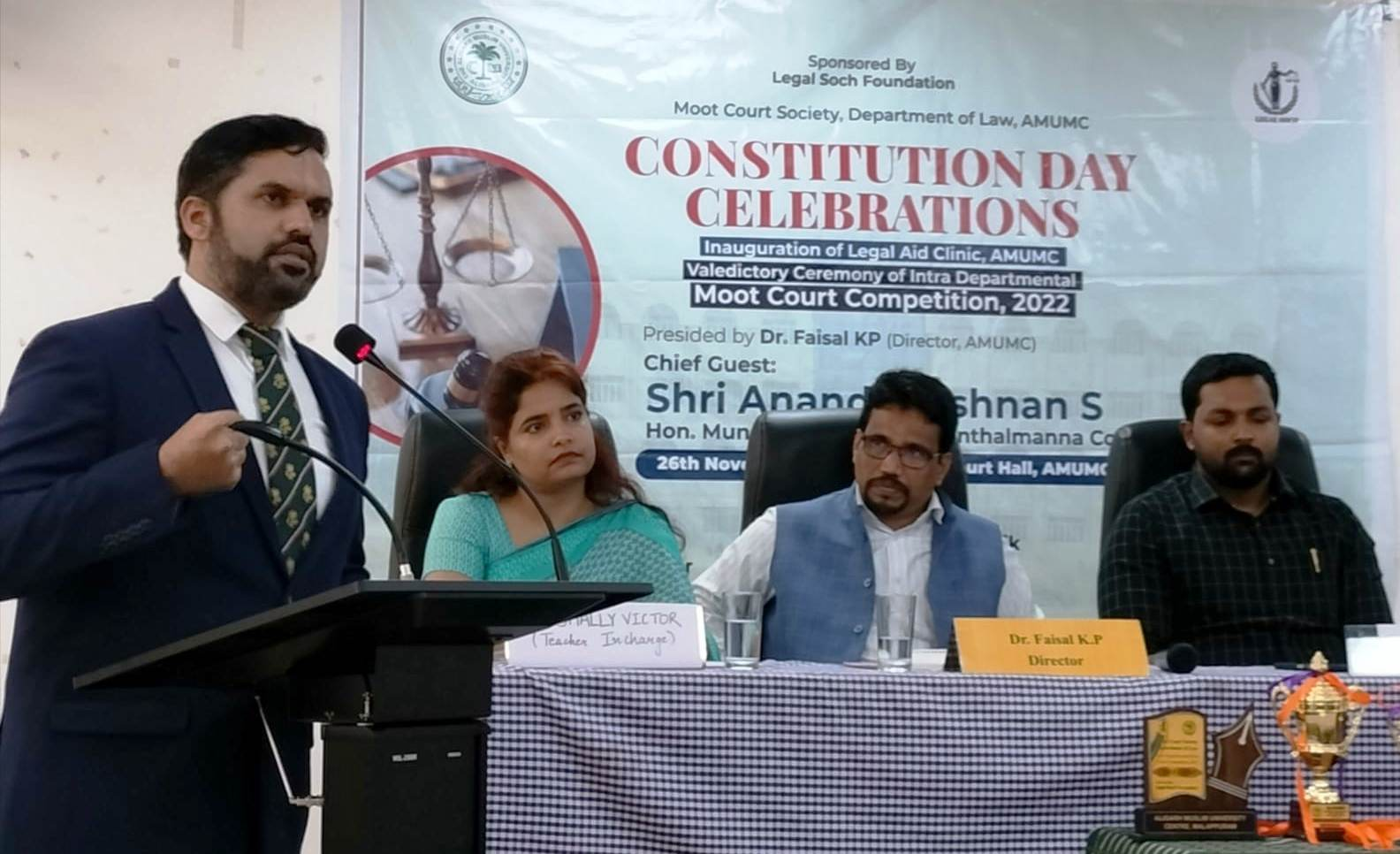
Dr. Shahnawaz Malik speaking in Constitution Day cum Valedictory function of Moot Court Competition in Nov 2022

The five-year integrated B.A.LL.B (Hons) course is based on semester system. The department is under Faculty of Law, Aligarh Muslim University. Prof. Muhammad Ashraf is the Dean, Faculty of Law. It has fully equipped classrooms, full-fledged library, audio-visual room, Seminar room, Moot Court hall and separate rooms for Faculty members. The department has various bodies and committees which includes vibrant Law Society and Legal Aid Committee through which various Legal, literary and cultural as well as extension activities regularly takes place in and outside campus. Dr. Shahnawaz Ahmed Malik is the fourth Coordinator of the department of Law.

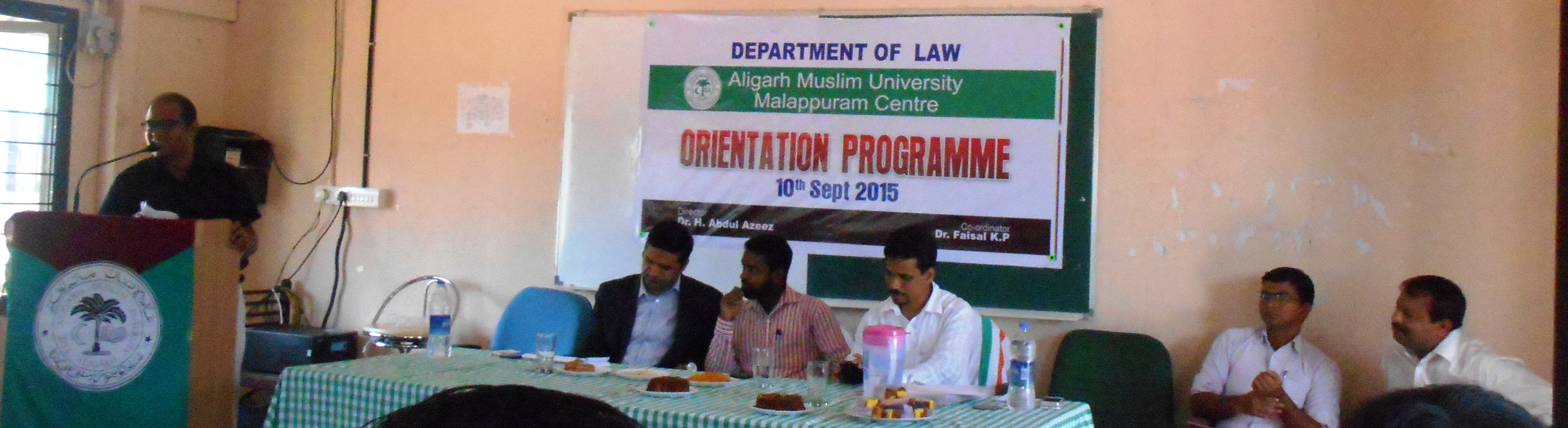
Orientation Programme in Department of Law in 2015.

In September 2019, one week Students Induction Programme (SIP) as mandated by University Grants Commission was organised. Earlier a Workshop on Gender Sensitization was held.

- Achievements:

The Law course is approved by BCI. There is excellent placement record of the department. Total Six students have qualified Judicial Service Exams from the Dept since 2010. Several students have joined High Courts of Kochi, Delhi, Allahabad and Patna High Courts while some are doing LL.M in prestigious institutions of the country. Ms. Farhanaz Parveen has qualified Uttar Pradesh Judicial Service Exam in 2019.

=== The Law Society ===
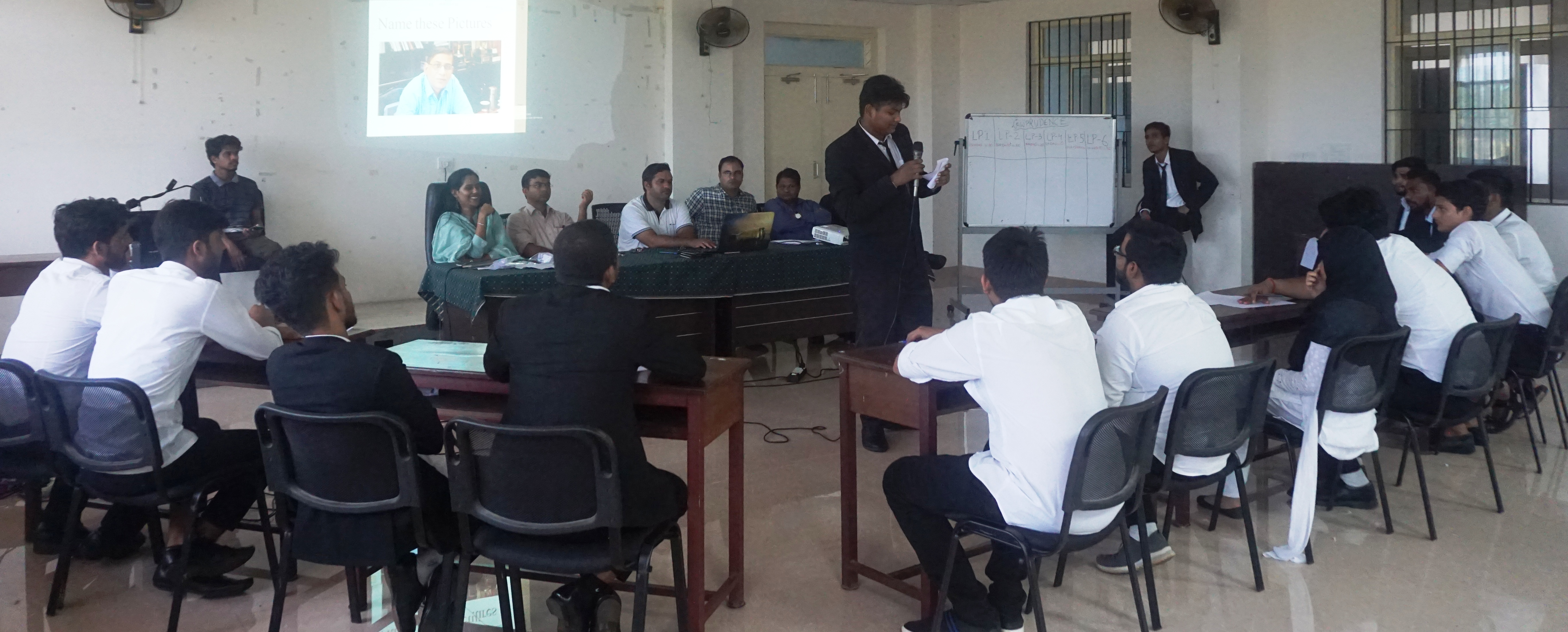
Legal Quiz Competition by Law Society as part of Law Fest Lex Fiesta 2019

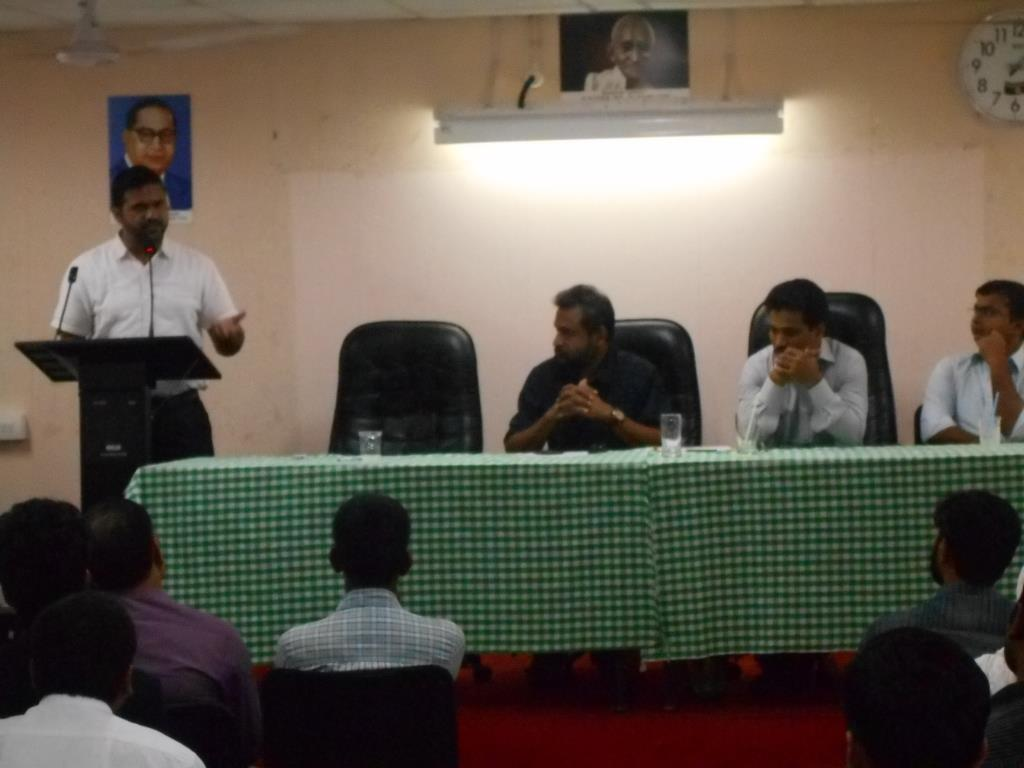
Dr.Shahnawaz Ahmed Malik speaking on Law Day Celebration in 2016

It was established at AMU Malappuram Campus in 2014 by the then Pro Vice Chancellor Brig Syed Ahmad Ali. Coordinator is head of the Law Society at AMU Centres. Dr. Shahnawaz Ahmed Malik is founding member and Faculty convener of the society along with Ms. Shally Victor. The Society has organised five Law festivals comprising Moot Court Competitions, Debate, Judgment Writing, Legal Quiz, Essay Writing, Skit, Poster making etc. In 2017–18, the Law Society at Malappuram centre of Aligarh Muslim University for session 2017–18 was inaugurated by Prof. Abur Rasheed K.M, (then Director), Aligarh Muslim University Malappuram Centre. He also launched the Intra Departmental Moot Court Competition. It has prepared students for various inter university and for national events. General secretary is selected from final year of BA.LL.B (Hons) and secretaries of various clubs are selected from junior classes. It also publishes a magazine named, Law Reporter. Students are selected through written test and interview.

In November 2019, Law Society organised Law festival titled, Lex Fiesta 2K19 based on Moot Court, Debate, Legal Quiz and Judgment criticism etc. and lasted for one week and culminated on 26 Nov on the occasion of Constitution day. It was attended by Judicial Magistrate of Perinthalmanna Ms. Sherin and President of Manjeri District Bar Association Advocate K.C Ashraf Presently Syed Muhammad Tyyab and Syed Ibrahim Quli are working as president and Gen Secretary respectively for the session 2022.

=== Legal Aid Committee ===
It was established in 2015 for providing legal aid to poor and weaker section of the society. The LAC at AMU Malappuram Centre organizes various awareness events in local area. Specially, Nukkad Natak is common feature. Dr. Naseema PK, Dr. Azmat Ali and Mr. Absar Aftab are In-charges of Legal Aid Clinic of the department.

=== Department of Business Administration ===
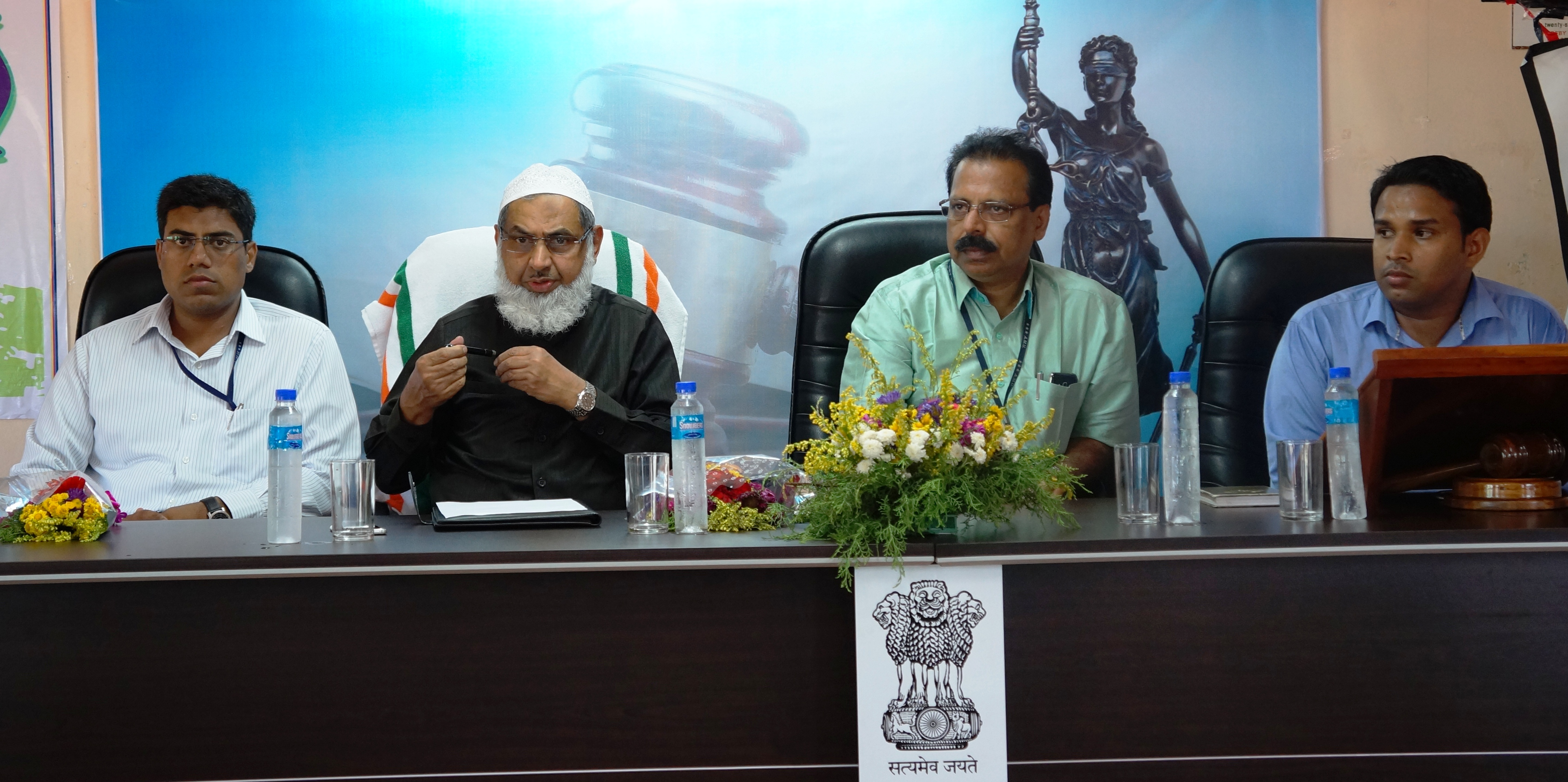
Department of Business Administration Orientation programme

A two-year M.B.A.(Masters in Business Administration) programme affiliated to Aligarh Muslim University, Aligarh is provided here. The Department of Business Administration here exhibits diverse faculties. The placement record of this department is good, many students are doing jobs in multinational companies while many students are treading on their path to become a successful entrepreneur. Dr.Lubna Ansari is the present Coordinator of the department. Following specializations are available here: Marketing, Finance, Human Resource Management and Operations & IT. The student may select either one major and one minor specialization, or simply one specialization. Interested students need to qualify Aligarh Muslim University Entrance Examination held every year in March. Applicants need to clear the group discussions and interview, followed by a counseling process and opting for AMU Malappuram Campus.

=== Education Department ===
Two years Bachelor of Education B.ed course is recognized by NCTE is being run in separate building of the centre. Dr. Abdul Basith P.P. is Coordinator of Education department. The department has produced hundreds of academicians who are serving all over the country.

== Social service ==
In 2017, Kerala faced its worst ever flood in nearly a century, AMU collected approximately Rs. 20 lakh from its teaching and non-teaching staff to be donated to the Chief Minister's Distress Relief Fund (CMDRF). AMU Malappuram Centre students and faculty members took part in Kerala Flood Relief Campaign on 26 August 2018.The students of AMU Malappuram Centre had rendered their wholehearted service in the flood-effected Ernakulam district of Kerala with Youth activists.

== Directors ==
The center is run by the Directors appointed by the Aligarh Muslim University, Aligarh from among the senior academicians rank.

- Prof. P. Muhammad (2010 to 2013)
- Prof. K.A Zakkariyya (2013 to 2014)
- Dr. H. Abdul Azeez (2014 to 2016)
- Prof. A. Nujum (2016)
- Prof. T. Satheesan (2017)
- Prof. Abdur Rasheed KA (Feb 2017 to May 2019)
- Dr. Faisal KP (acting director) (May 2019 to July 2025)
- Prof. M. Shahul Hameed (acting director) (August 2025 to present)

== Admission process ==
The admission process starts in February–March. There is an all India exam for all the three courses being run at this campus for which special test centers are also available in some districts of Kerala. The students can apply through AMU Controller of Exam for above courses i.e. five-year Law, MBA and B.ed. Malappuram Campus may be given to them as per preference in merit list.

== Location ==
The campus is located at Chelamala hills near Cherukara village at Perinthalmanna town in District Malappuram. The village can be accessed by local buses and taxis. The Shoranur - Nilambur Railway line serves this area. Railway line from Nilambur connecting Shornur passes through Cherukara can be accessed by Cherukara Railway station. The nearest airport is Kozhikode Airport in Karipur, Kondotty. The nearest major railway station is at Pattambi. The nearest city is Perinthalmanna which is about 6 kilometres (3.7 mi) away. Cherukara connects to other parts of India through Perinthalmanna town. The southern stretch connects to Cochin and Trivandrum. Highway No.966 goes to Palakkad and Coimbatore.

== See also ==
- List of Aligarh Muslim University alumni
- Aligarh Muslim University Students' Union
- Aligarh Muslim University: Murshidabad Centre West Bengal
