= St Joseph's College, Prayagraj =

Saint Joseph's College, Prayagraj

Location
- 2 Tashkent Marg, Prayagraj, Uttar Pradesh, India
- Coordinates: 25.4559°N 81.8452°E

Information
- Type: Private
- Motto: Latin: Semper Sursum (Always Aim High)
- Religious affiliation: Roman Catholic
- Sister school: St. Joseph's College Annexe (Junior), St.Joseph's Girls' College
- Principal: Reverend Father Walter D'Silva
- Enrollment: Over 10000
- Campus: Convent
- Houses: St. Francis; St. George; St. Patrick; St. Andrews
- Colours: light blue navy blue green
- Affiliation: The Indian Certificate of Secondary Education Examinations (ICSE) and The Indian School Certificate Examinations (ISC)
- Alumni: Ex. Josephites
- Website: www.sjcallahabad.org

St. Joseph's College, abbreviated to SJC, established in 1884, is a prominent CISCE-affiliated elite school in Prayagraj, Uttar Pradesh, India, with high rankings both in the state and in India.

It is affiliated with the Council for the Indian School Certificate Examinations. With over 1000 students collectively enrolled within its main, annexes, and girls' wing campuses, the college is one of the largest schools of Prayagraj in terms of enrolment. The college's motto is Semper Sursum – Always Aim High.

Reverend Father Walter D'Saliva is the current principal of the college. Students of the institution are known as Josephites.

== Josephest ==
The biggest cultural event of the college is Josephest, which is held annually at the end of October and sometimes at the start of November. A number of schools from the city as well as from other cities in the state participate. A multitude of events are organized during the two-day festival that range from literary, art and craft, music and dance competitions to skits, quizzes and computer programming competitions.

Major events are held in the main auditorium, which has a seating capacity of over 12000 people. Minor events are either organised in the Hogan Hall, the reading room or the respective designated areas such as the computer laboratory, gymnasium, or art room. The events are judged by distinguished jury members invited from various institutions and organisations in Prayagraj.

== Notable alumni ==
The college has the distinction of having given many top ranked elite, highest serving officials in the country, ranging from numerous Chief Justices and Judges, civil servants, doctors, scientists, politicians, businessmen and bureaucrats, amongst other professionals.

- Amit Agrawal – professor
- Syed Ahmad Ali – army officer, former pro-vice chancellor of Aligarh Muslim University
- Prashant Bhushan – lawyer, activist
- Norman Anil Kumar Browne – former Chief of Air Staff, Indian Air Force
- Parvez Dewan - former Indian administrator, author and librettist
- Tigmanshu Dhulia – director, actor, screenwriter, film producer
- Yogendra Dimri - General Officer Commanding - in Chief, Central Command, Indian Army
- Rahul Kanwal – journalist
- V. N. Khare – former Chief Justice of India
- Madan Lokur – former judge at the Supreme Court of India
- Raghunandan Swarup Pathak – former Chief Justice of India
- Mriganka Sur – neuroscientist
