= Paloor Kotta Falls =

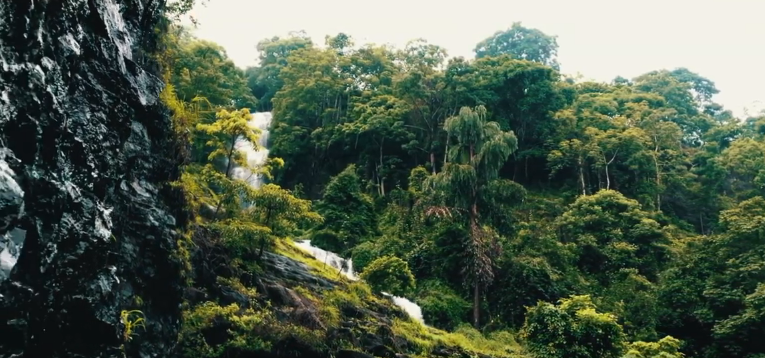
- Interactive map of Paloor Kotta Falls
- Location: Kadungapuram, Perinthalmanna taluk, Malappuram district, Kerala, India
- Coordinates: 10°57′58″N 76°09′14″E

Paloor Kotta Falls is a waterfall in Kadungapuram village of Malappuram district in Kerala, India. It is situated 7 kilometres away from Angadipuram and 10 kilometres away from Perinthalmanna town. It originates from a pond-like water source and empties into a small canal. Tipu Sultan had once sought asylum here.
