= Syed Ahmad Ali =

Senior officer of the Indian Army (born 1954)

- Born: 10 August 1954 (age 72); Allahabad
- Military career
- Allegiance: India
- Branch: Indian Army
- Service years: 35 Years
- Rank: Brigadier
- Unit: Kumaon Regiment
- Awards: Sena Medal

Brigadier Syed Ahmad Ali is a retired senior officer of the Indian Army. He was the former pro-vice chancellor of Aligarh Muslim University from 26 September 2012 to 16 May 2017. He is the director of Jahangirabad Educational Institute of Technology.

== Biography ==
Ahmad Ali was born on 10 August 1954 in Allahabad. His father, Syed Mahbub Ali, was a social reformer and zamindar. Ahmad Ali completed his primary education at St. Joseph's College, Allahabad where he completed his Indian School Certificate in 1972. He continued his education in Govt. Inter College, Allahabad. In 1976, he graduated from Allahabad University and qualified for the Combined Defence Services Examination conducted by the Union Public Service Commission. He subsequently joined the Indian Army and was commissioned into the Infantry Kumaon Regiment in 1977. For his distinguished services during Operation Vijay, he received the Sena Medal.

He obtained a master's degree in defence studies from Chennai University in 1990 and another in management sciences from Osmania University in 2002.
