= Paravakkal =

Village in Kerala, India

Coordinates: 12°55′N 78°49′E

Paravakkal is a town in the Kadungapuram village of the Puzhakkattiri panchayath, located in the Malappuram district, in the state of Kerala, southeast India. It was the homeland of Valluvanad, an erstwhile kingdom in Malabar. Perinthalmanna, Malappuram, and Kottakkal are some of the major towns nearby.

There is a tradition known as Nercha and Pooram which is a symbol of unity among various religions in the area.

== Geography ==
The town is 12 km (7.5 mi) from Perinthalmanna, the taluk headquarters, and 11 km (6.8 mi) from the district headquarters at Malappuram. The town is midway between Perinthalmanna and Kottakkal road. The Paravakkal Lake is located north of the town, which lays close south to National Highway 213. The land is mostly dry and flat, few hills obstruct the nearby fields. An abundant amount of trees and shrubbery lie to the south of the town.

== People ==
Paravakkal consists of 1723 people, 838 of which are male, and 885 female.

== Culture ==
Paravakkal village is a predominantly Muslim populated area. Hindus exist in comparatively smaller numbers. So the culture of the locality is based upon Muslim traditions. Duff Muttu, Kolkali and Aravanamuttu are common folk arts of this locality. There are many libraries attached to mosques giving a rich source of Islamic studies. Most of the books are written in Arabi-Malayalam which is a version of the Malayalam language written in Arabic script. People gather in mosques for the evening prayer and continue to sit there after the prayers discussing social and cultural issues. Business and family issues are also sorted out during these evening meetings. The Hindu minority of this area keeps their rich traditions by celebrating various festivals in their temples. Hindu rituals are done here with a regular devotion like other parts of Kerala.

== Transportation ==
Paravakkal village connects to other parts of India through Perinthalmanna town. National highway No.66 passes through Tirur and the northern stretch connects to Goa and Mumbai. The southern stretch connects to Cochin and Trivandrum. Highway No.966 goes to Palakkad and Coimbatore. The nearest airport is at Kozhikode. The nearest major railway station is at Tirur.
