= Kelappaji College of Agricultural Engineering and Technology =

College in Kerala

Kelappaji College of Agricultural Engineering and Technology, Thavanur
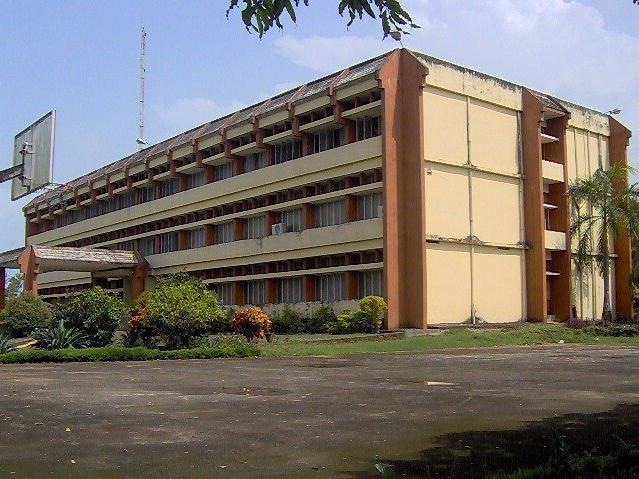
- Dean: Dr. Jayan P R
- Location: Thavanur, Malappuram, Kerala, India; 10.85251546°N 75.98591521°E
- Campus: 99 acres (400,000 m^{2}) on the banks of the Bharathapuzha River
- Acronym: KCAET
- Website: http://www.kcaet.ac.in

The Kelappaji College of Agricultural Engineering and Technology (KCAET), the only Agricultural Engineering college in Kerala, is situated at Tavanur in Malappuram district and is named after the freedom fighter and social reformer Sri K. Kelappan. This institution is part of the Kerala Agricultural University.

== History ==
In 1956, the National Council for Rural Higher education was set up by the Government of India, which established 14 Rural Institutes all over India from 1956 to 1963 to promote educational development in Agriculture, Engineering, Public Health and Humanities, in rural areas. The Rural Institute, Tavanur, in then Palakkad district was established in 1963.

Shri. K. Kelappan, popularly known as Kerala Gandhi, who had already established a high school, The Sarvodayapuram Post Basic School in Tavanur, had influenced the then Central Government in establishing this prestigious Institute for higher education in this village. Shri. K. Kelappan and the local dignitaries, Shri. T. M. Vasudevan Namboodiri and Shri. K. C. V. Raja identified the suitable 100 Acres of land for this purpose and approached the owners of this land, Vellayil Mana and The Pappinikkavu temple Devaswom to donate this land. The head of Vellayil Mana who is also the trustee of the Pappinikkavu Devaswom Shri. V. M. Narayanan Namboodiri and his brother Shri V. M. Neelakandhan Namboodiri, the descendants of Shri. Vilwamangalam Swamiyar, the famous sage and devotee of Sri. Guruvayurappan, donated the required land including the remains of their hereditary home (Illathara) where Vilwamangalam Swamiyar lived and Sri. Vasudevapuram temple, which he built for his mother. The Vasudevapuram temple and the remains of Sri. Vilwamangalam Swamiyar’s home, which has great historical importance, are in the middle of this campus.

The courses conducted at this institution were the following.

1. Diploma in Rural Science: 2+3 years Degree course in Science and humanities.

2. Diploma in Civil and Rural Engineering: 3 Years Diploma in Civil Engineering.

3. Diploma in Agriculture: 2 years Diploma in Agriculture and Animal Husbandry.

4. Diploma in Sanitary Engineering: 1 Year diploma course.

Shri. A. Sankara Pillai was the first director of this institution. There were also three Principals heading the Humanities, Engineering and Agriculture departments. A large agriculture and dairy farm, well equipped science laboratories, engineering workshops, an equipped veterinary Clinic etc. were also part of this institute. The management of this Institution was by the governing body constituting, The Governor of Kerala, Chairman, and Shri. Kelappan, Vice-Chairman, The Director, Secretary and the local MLA, and local dignitaries as members of this body. The Government of India and the State Government were jointly funding this prestigious Educational Institution till 1975.

The Kerala Government handed over this campus to Kerala Agriculture University and established the Faculty of Agricultural Engineering & Technology in 1975 and named it as the Institute of Agricultural Technology (IAT). On October 2, 1985, IAT was renamed after the founder of this Institution Shri. K. Kelappan as Kelappaji College of Agricultural Engineering & Technology (KCAET). The University started the courses in Agriculture Engineering in 1985, and Food technology in 2011.

Courses offered:

- B.Tech. Agricultural Engineering
- B.Tech. Food Engineering
- M.Tech. Farm Power, Machinery and Energy
- M.Tech. Land and Water Resources Conservation Engineering
- M.Tech. Post Harvest Technology and Agricultural Processing
- Ph.D. Farm Power, Machinery and Energy
- Ph.D. Land and Water Resources Conservation Engineering
- Ph.D. Post Harvest Technology and Agricultural Processing

== Admission procedure ==
- B.Tech. (Agricultural Engineering): selected by the Kerala Engineering Agriculture Medical Degree (KEAM) Examination conducted by Commissioner for Entrance Examinations.
- M.Tech. programmes: selected by Kerala Agricultural University based on entrance tests.
- ICAR seats: certain seats are available for the candidates who are selected via ICAR entrance examination
- B.Tech. (Food Engineering): admission by the Kerala Engineering Agriculture Medical Degree (KEAM)Examination conducted by Commissioner for Entrance Examinations.

== Departments ==
- Food and Agricultural Process engineering.
- Land and Water Resources Conservation Engineering.
- Irrigation and Drainage Engineering.
- Farm Power, Machinery and Energy.
- Supportive and Allied Courses of Study.
