= Thavanur =

- Village
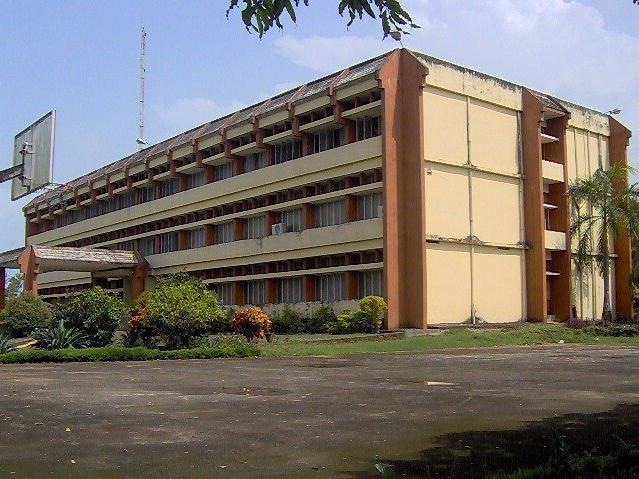
- KCAET. Thavanur

- Location in Kerala, India Thavanur (India)
- Coordinates: 10°51′5″N 75°59′14″E
- Country: India
- State: Kerala
- District: Malappuram

Languages
  - Official: Malayalam, English
- Time zone: UTC+5:30 (IST)
- PIN: 679573
- Telephone code: 0494
- Vehicle registration: KL-54
- Nearest towns: Kuttippuram, Edappal, Ponnani, Tirur, Valanchery

Thavanur (Tavanur, Thavanoor, or Tavanoor) is a village on the southern bank of the Bharathapuzha, the longest river in Kerala, in the Malappuram District of Kerala State, India. It is located at the border of Tirur and Ponnani Taluks. The Bharathappuzha River separates Thavanur from the towns of Tirunavaya and Kuttippuram in Tirur Taluk.

== Education ==
Kelappaji College of Agricultural Engineering & Technology campus is located in Thavanur village on the southern bank of Bharathapuzha.

== History ==
Thavanur village is located on the banks of the river Bharathappuzha. There is a proverb about the place name history that Thapassanur became Thavanur. According to popular belief, the name Tapassanoor is derived from the legend that centuries ago sages performed penance on the shore. The caves and pottery found here are cited as examples of this view. The village was located at the southern tip of the medieval Vettathunadu, a vassal kingdom of the Zamorin of Calicut, which had ruled parts of present-day Tirurangadi, Tirur, and Ponnani Taluks in Malappuram District. Vellayil Mana and Tavanur Mana were the two most famous Nambudiri Manas in the Thavanoor Amsom. There is a proverb in the area, The word of the Vellayil and the money of Thavanur. This proverb is the culmination of the rivalry between these Manas and the supremacy of the aristocracy. Thavanur village is famous for its Kavus. Pappinikkavu, Chundekkavu, Karimpiyankavu, Velampullikkavu and Bharanikkavu are some of the famous Kavus here.

The activities of the national movement in Thavanur became active with the arrival of K. Kelappan, popularly known as Kerala Gandhi, and a leader of the Indian National Congress. Thavanur became his career path when he became a teacher in Ponnani. The reason why the scratches of the Malabar Rebellion did not occur here was due to the combined tireless efforts of K. Kelappan along with the Attakoya of Ponnani, a Muslim theologian and Muslim League leader. The freedom struggle intensified here in 1942 with the Indian National Congress meeting held at Pappinikavu Maidanam in Thavanur. It was also the beginning of the first collective struggle against British rule. Vasudevan Namboothiri, NP Damodaran, Advocate Raman Menon, Gopalakurup, PK Menon and Madambath Govindan Menon were among the prominent leaders of that meeting. With the immersion of Mahatma Gandhi's ashes here in 1948, Thavanur became more famous. Thavanur was also the working platform of Kozhipurath Madhava Menon and A V Kuttimalu Amma who reached at higher position of the national movement.

Formal education began here in the early 20th century with the establishment of the Malabar Board School at Thrikkanapuram. This school is now functioning as GLP School Thrikkanapuram. After that the Kalady Board Elementary School (now Kalady GLPS) at Pulluvanpady and the SSUPS School at Andyalamkudam were established in Thavanur. There was also a Harijan Welfare School in Maravanchari for the education of Harijans. The present KMG Vocational Higher Secondary School was the Sarvodayam Post Basic School established by Kelappaji near the tomb. The Rural Institute was another great institution. It is now known as the 'Kelappaji College of Agricultural Engineering & Technology'. The first bus service was started in the year 1940 in this panchayath which used to have only ox carts and horse carts. The service was extended to Ponnani - Edappal - Kandanakam - Kuttippuram Kadavu. Electricity reached the area in the 1950s. The first post office of the panchayat was established in 1950 at Thavanur.

== See also ==
- Thavanur (State Assembly constituency)
- Mini Pampa, Malappuram, a pilgrimage site in the village
