= Athavanad =

Village in Kerala, India

Athavanad Azhvanchery
- Village
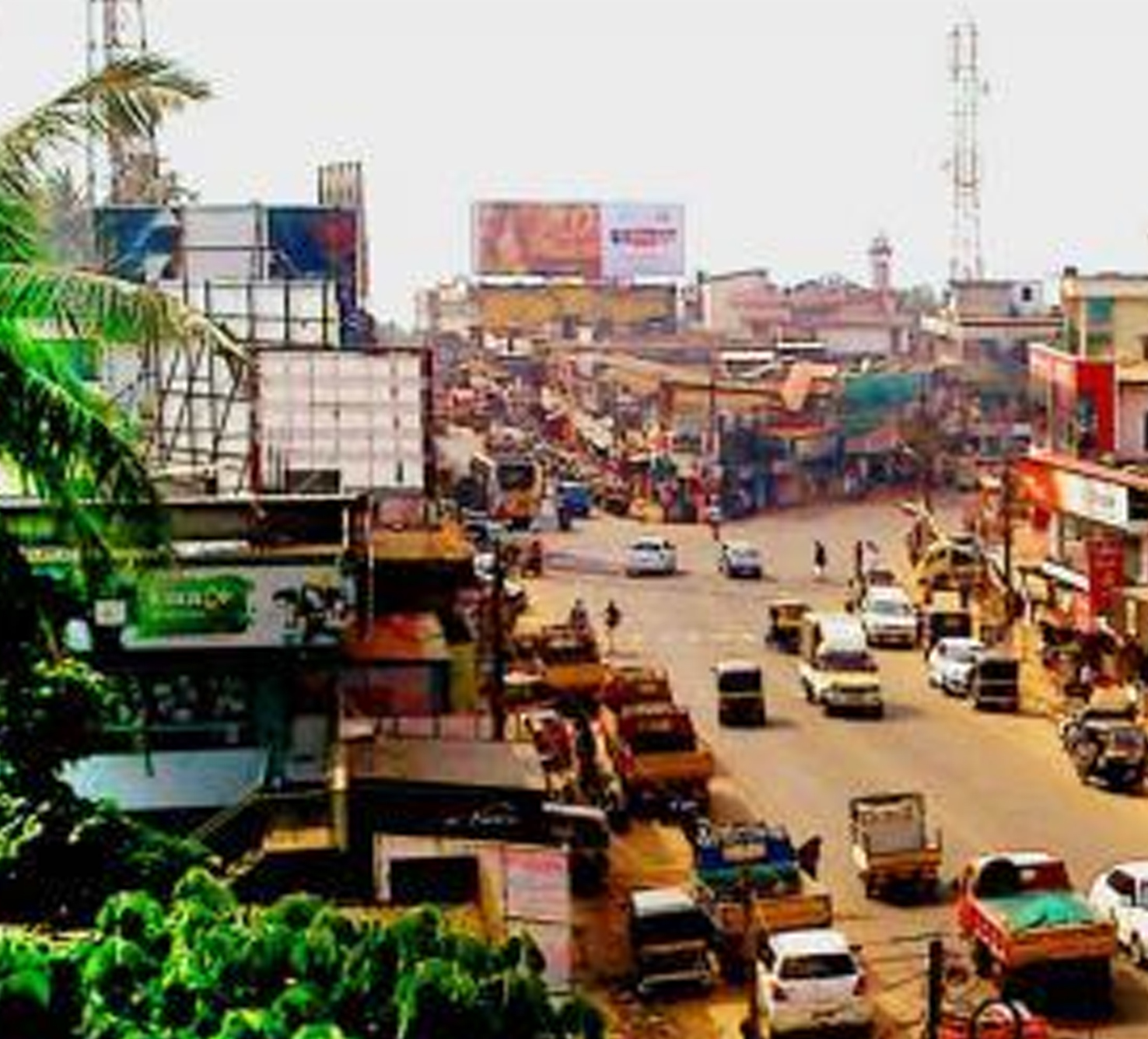
- Puthanathani Town in Athavanad

- Location in Kerala, India Athavanad (India)
- Coordinates: 10.8962722°N 76.0325253°E
- Country: India
- State: Kerala
- District: Malappuram

Population (2011)
  - Total: 20,480
- PIN: 676301
- Vehicle registration: KL 55, KL 10

Athavanad is a village and Gram Panchayath in the Tirur Taluk, in the Malappuram District of the state of Kerala, India. The town lies on the National Highway 66, between Puthanathani and Valanchery. Puthanathani is the main town of the Athavanad village and the village office is located in Athavanad Para & Kurumbathoor. Nearby towns include Valanchery, Tavanur, Tirunavaya, and Kuttippuram.

== Etymology ==
In Malayalam, "Athavanad" is an abbreviation of "Azhvanchery Thambrakkal Vazhunna Nadu". The region was under the rule of the Azhvanchery Thamprakkal feudal lords in ancient times. Azhvanchery Thamprakkal were usually present at the Ariyittu Vazhcha of a new Zamorin of Calicut. The original headquarters of Palakkad Rajas were also at Athavanad.

== Industries ==
Athavanad has some industries. Athavanad is home to several public enterprises in the textile industry.

- The MALCOTEX (Malabar Co-operative Textiles Limited) is headquartered at Athavanad.
- KELTEX (Kerala Hi-Tech Textile Cooperative Limited) is also located here.

== Demographics ==
As of the 2011 Census of India, Athavanad had a population of 20480. 9612 (47%) are men, and around 10868 (53%) are women. Children under the age of six make up 13.63% of Athavanad's population.

Malayalam is the most spoken language.

== Culture ==
=== Religion ===
Athavanad is predominantly Hindu and Muslim; Duff Muttu, Kolkali, and Aravanamuttu are local traditions.

=== Events ===
The Kerala Cattle Race (known as Kalappoottu and Maramadi) is a traditional event. It was banned in 2014 by a court ruling, as it was deemed to violate a 1960 law pertaining to preventing animal cruelty.

== Attractions ==
- Ayyapanov Waterfall is situated in Athavanad Kattilangadi.

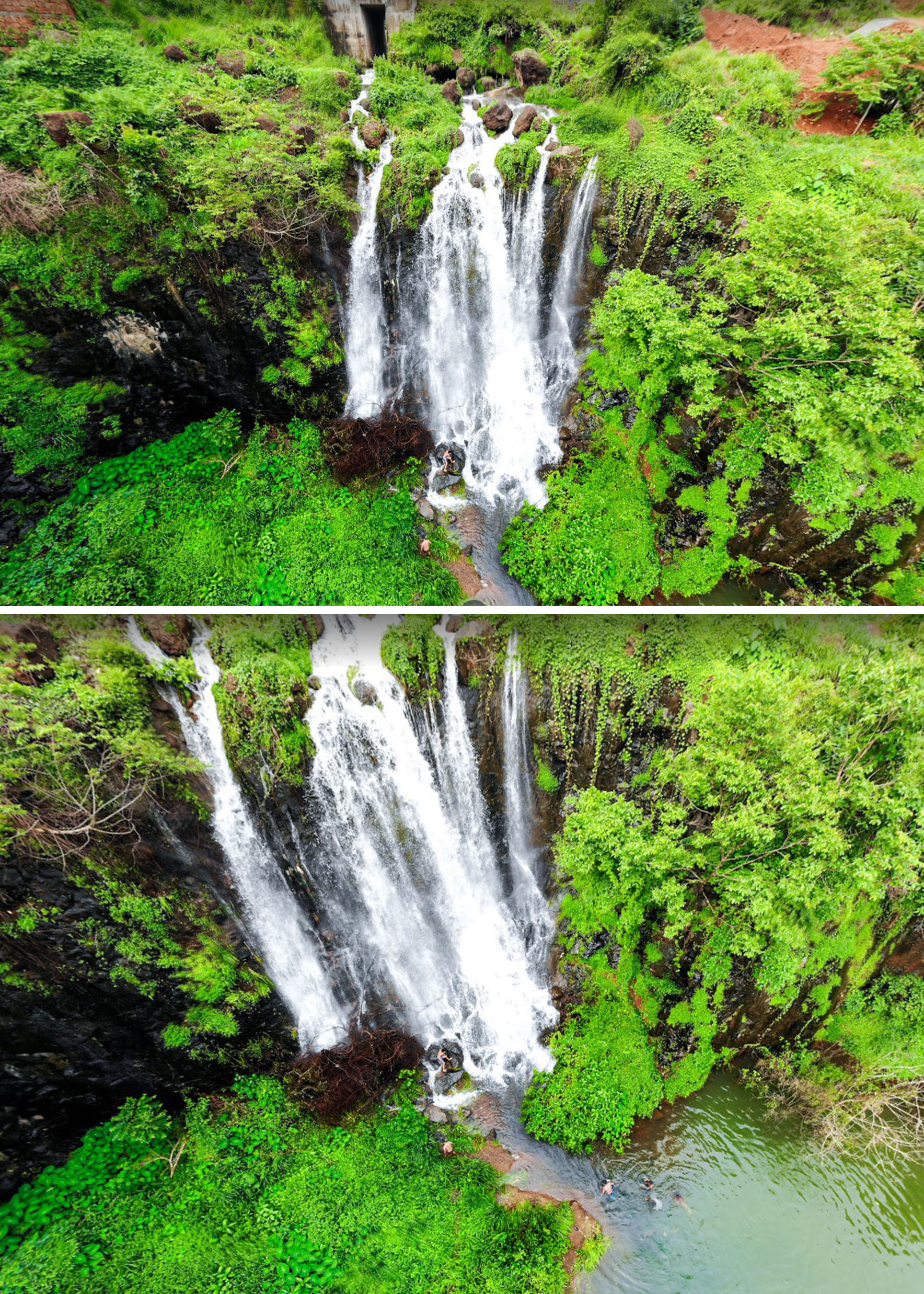
Ayyappanov Waterfalls

== Education ==
Athavanad is a major educational hub. It has several educational institutions ranging from primary to post-secondary. It also has several libraries and a literacy rate of over 90%. The majority of books are written in Malayalam, English, and Sanskrit. Some are written in Arabi-Malayalam, a version of the Malayalam language written in the Arabic script.

=== Educational institutions ===
- Markaz College of Arts and Science
- Athavanad Mattummal Higher Secondary School
- Athavanad Parithi High school
- Badariyya Arabic College, Palathani
- KMCT Law College
- KMCT Polytechnic College
- Majmau Higher Secondary School
- Majmau Orphanage
- Majmau Thazkiyath Islamiya
- Markaz Residential School
- Markazu Tharbiyathul Islam B-Ed
- Markazu Tharbiyathul Islam Higher Secondary School
- Markazu Tharbiyathul Islam
- Markazu Tharbiyathul Teachers Training Center
- Mohammed Ali Shihab Thangal Memorial Arts And Science College
- PMSA Orphanage Hospital, Athavanad Kattilangadi
- Z.M.H.S Poolamangalam

== Transportation ==
=== Road ===
- Athavanad is connected to other parts of India through valanchery.
- National highway No.66 passes through valanchery, Malappuram and the northern stretch connects to Goa and Mumbai. The southern stretch connects to Cochin and Trivandrum.
- State Highway No.28 starts from Nilambur and connects to Ooty, Mysore and Bangalore through Highways.12,29 and 181.
- National Highway No.966 connects to Palakkad and Coimbatore.

=== Air ===
- The nearest airport is at Karipur International Airport.

=== Rail ===
- Kuttippuram railway station is a major railway station 10 km from Athavanad
- Tirunnavaya railway station
- Perashshannur railway station
- Tirur railway station

=== Bus ===
- Puthanathani Bus Station
- Valanchery Bus Station

== Notable people ==
- Melpathur Narayana Bhattathiri
- Mohsin Peramban

== See also ==
- Athavanad Gram Panchayat
- Ayyapanov Waterfalls
- vairankode vela
