= Vairankode =

- Village
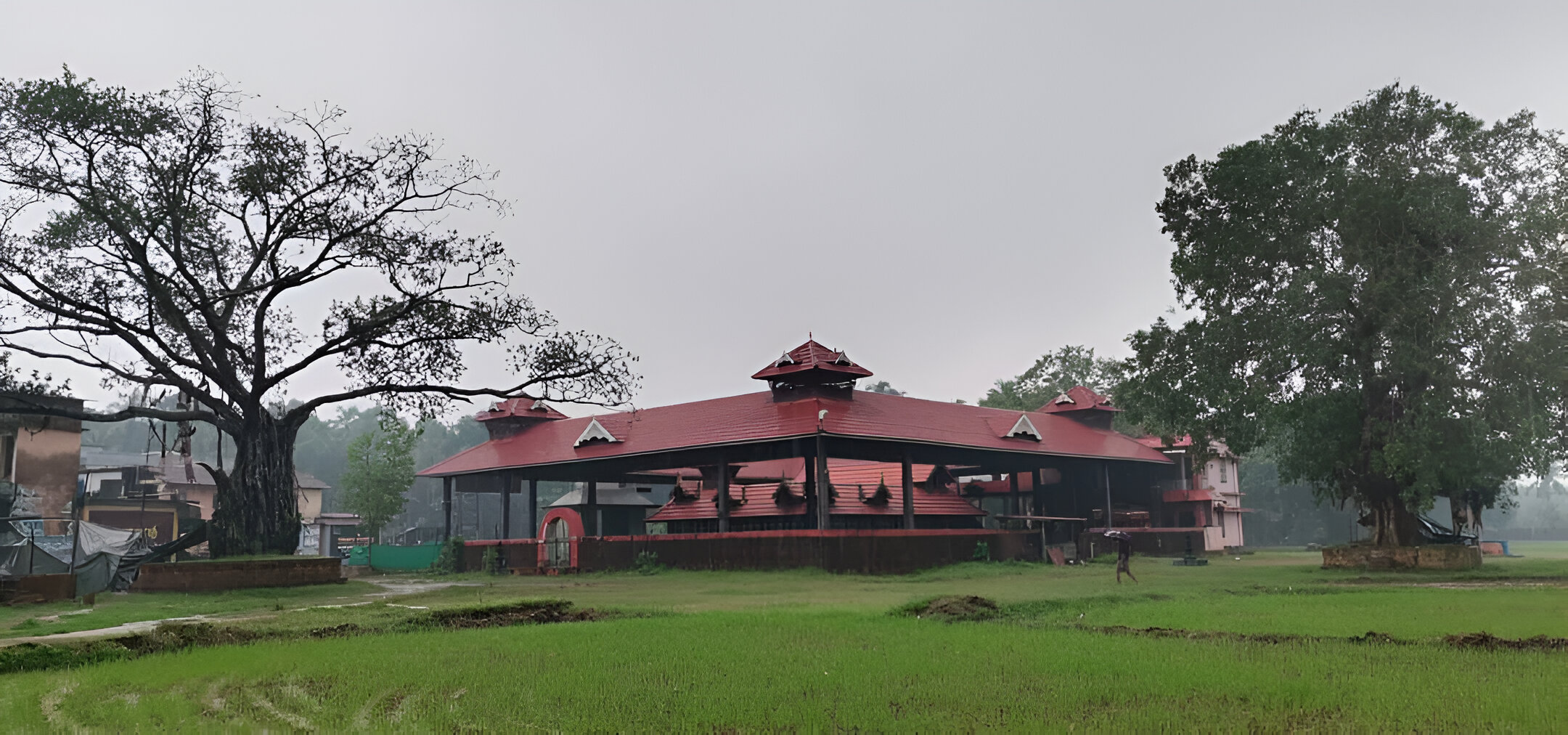
- Sree Vairankode Bhagavathi Temple

- Location in Kerala, India Vairankode (India)
- Coordinates: 10.886361°N 75.976307°E
- Country: India
- State: Kerala
- District: Malappuram

Languages
  - Official: Malayalam, English
- Time zone: UTC+5:30 (IST)
- PIN: 676301
- Telephone code: 0494
- Vehicle registration: KL-10/KL-55
- Nearest city: Tirur
- Lok Sabha constituency: Ponnani

Vairankode, also spelled as Vairamkode, is a small village in Thirunavaya grama Panchayath of Tirur Taluk in Malappuram district, Kerala. It is well known for Sree Vairankode Bhagavathi temple, one of the oldest and most popular Bhagavathi temples in Kerala. The village and temple are situated on Pattarnadakkavu – BP Angadi Road.

== History ==
Vairankode is located near Thirunavaya, a holy city famous for its Mamangam festival. Vairankode, situated in Malappuram district, was a brahmadeya village under the Azhvanchery Thamprakkal. Vairankode Azhvanchery, which belonged to Vettathu Nadu, was under the rule of the Tambras. The Vairankode Road was built later on as the main route linking Vettath Tampuran fort and Athavanad Azhvancherymana. This road connects Vairankode, Tirur, and Pattarnadakkavu with one another. Melpathur Narayana Bhattathiri, the renowned poet, was born in Melpatthur Illat near the Nila River, just 4 km from Vairankode.

== Geography ==
Vairankode is situated in the center of the 'Pallar' territory which consists of six lands: Alloor, Kuttur, Kaithakkara, Valiyaparappur, Pallar, and Ananthavoor.

== Places of Worship ==
- Sree Vairankode Bhagavathy Temple
- Sree Rudirppan Temple
- Sree Subrahmanya Temple
- Pallar Juma Masjid

== See also ==
- Vairankode Vela
- Azhvanchery Thamprakkal
- Thunchaththu Ezhuthachan
- Melpathur Narayana Bhattathiri
- Vallathol Narayana Menon
- Mamankam festival

== Transportation ==
- Nearest Airports: Calicut (CCJ) and Cochin International Airport
- Nearest Municipality: Tirur
- Nearest Major Railway Station:Tirunnavaya Railway station 4 km, Tirur Railway station10 km, Kuttippuram Railway station11 km
- Nearest Bus Station:Tirur10 km, Kuttipuram 11 km, Puthanathani 10 km
