= Lotus Lake Wetland Thirunavaya Malappuram =

Migratory bird sanctuary in Malappuram, Kerala

Lotus Lake and Migratory Birds Sanctuary Thirunavaya
- Lotus Lake Thirunavaya
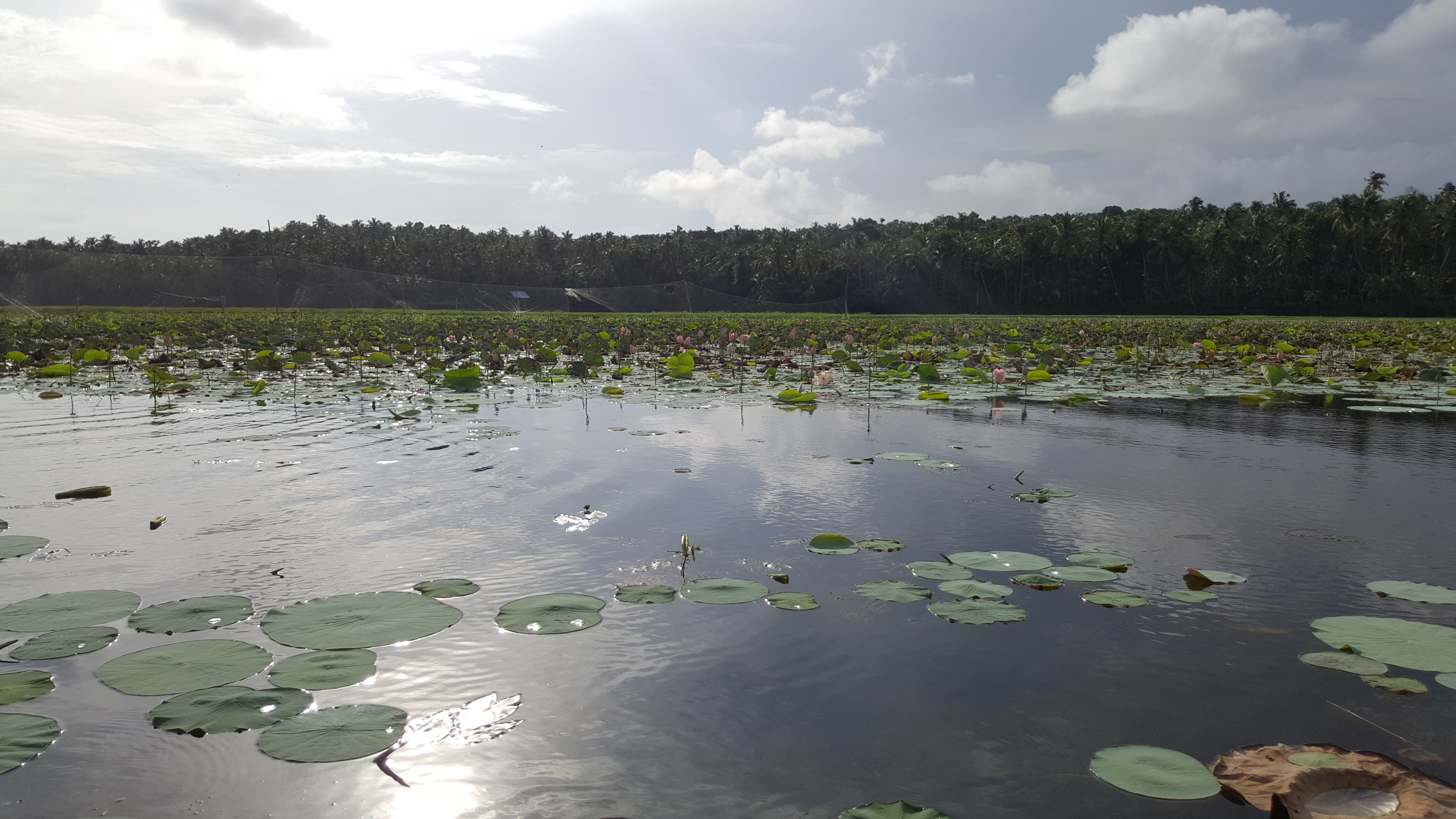

- Location within Kerala Location within India
- Location: Tirunavaya
- Coordinates: 10.8753722°N 75.9908723°E
- River sources: Bharathappuzha
- Ocean/sea sources: Arabian Sea

Lotus Lake Thirunavaya, also called Migratory Birds Sanctuary Thirunavaya bird sanctuary on a lake and wetland located in Tirunavaya, Malappuram district, Kerala, India. Many lotus lakes can be seen here, including South Pallar lotus Lake, Valiyaparapoor lotus Lake and Edakulam lotus Lake. The sanctuary is visited by many migratory birds.

== Lotus Lake Thirunavaya ==
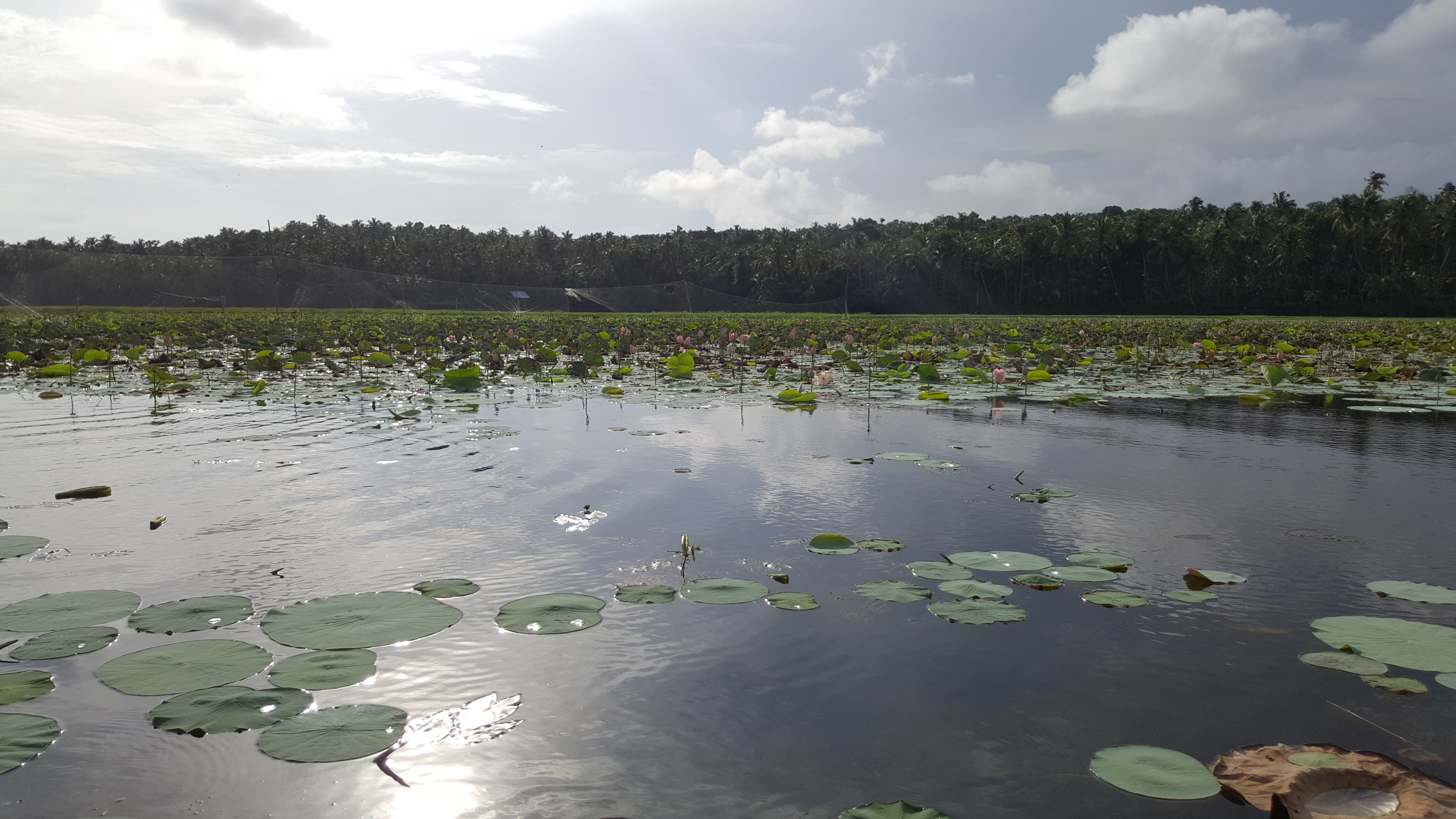
Lotus Lake Thirunavaya

Thirunavaya Lotus lake and Lotus farm is a popular tourist destination. it is famous for the lotus plants on the lake and the temples near the lake, the Thirunavaya Navamukunda Temple. The lotus flowers grown here are exported to many Indian states and temples. Their cultivation is largely done by the local people, primarily Muslim farmers.

== Migratory Birds Sanctuary Thirunavaya ==
Migratory birds that have visited the sanctuary include the Asian openbill stork, and egrets. During the September–February season sighting of rare migratory birds are common here as well as waterfowl, koel, owl, egret, heron, cormorant, moorhen, darter, and brahminy kite, and other birds are seen here during their respective migratory seasons. Some of the migratory birds come from the Himalayas, and a few from Siberia.

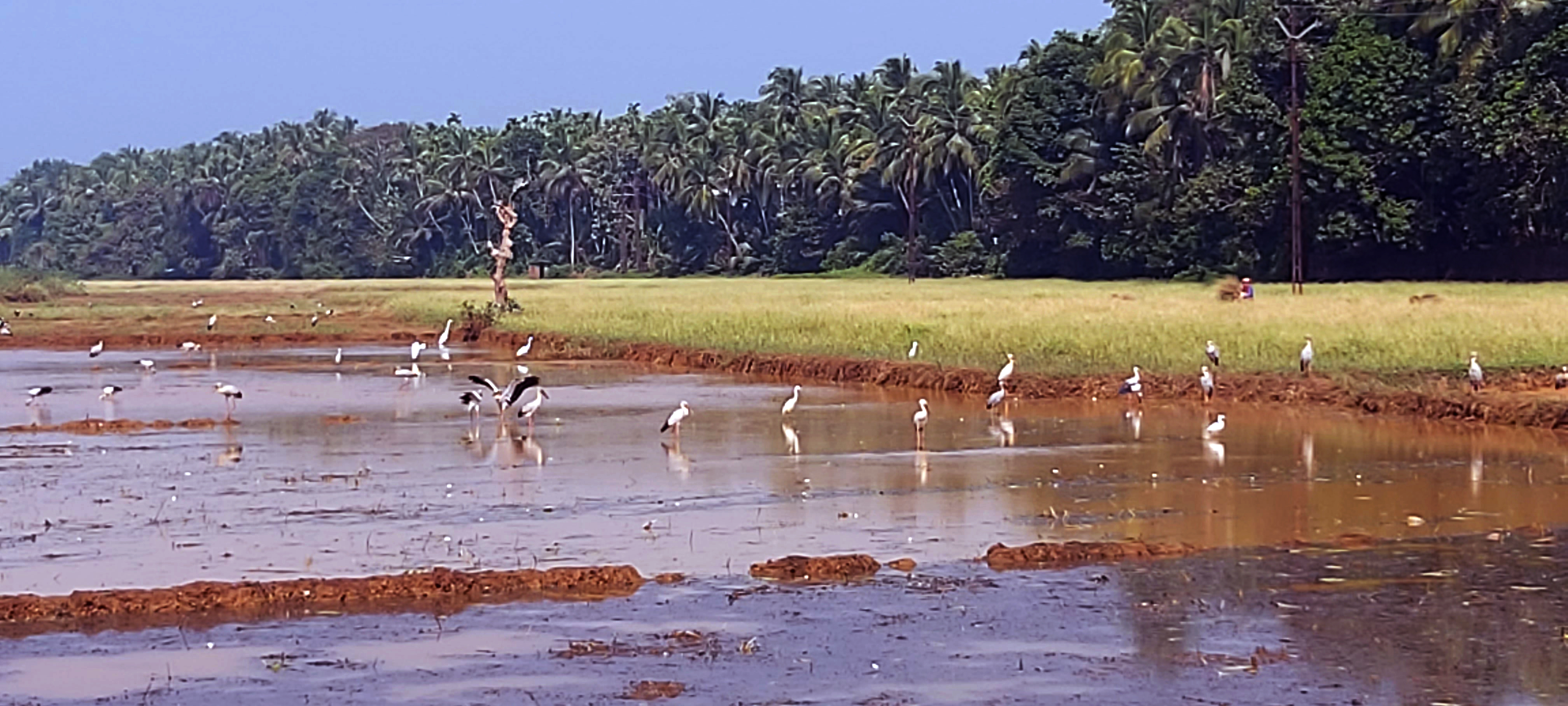
Asian openbill in Migratory Birds Sanctuary Thirunavaya

== Geography ==
The Lotus Lake and sanctuary is spread over 20 acres (8.1 ha) on the southern bank of the Bharathappuzha River

Lotus Lake Thirunavaya is 0.5 kilometres (0.31 mi) from Tirunnavaya railway station. State Highway No. 66 leads to Puthanathani and Kuttippuram in opposite directions. Kozhikode International Airport is 40 km (25 mi) from Thirunavaya.
