= Ananthavoor =

- village
- Location in Kerala, India Ananthavoor (India)
- Coordinates: 10.8925500°N 75.9982900°E
- Country: India
- State: Kerala
- District: Malappuram

Population (2011)
  - Total: 21,058

Languages
  - Official: Malayalam, English
- Time zone: UTC+5:30 (IST)
- PIN: 6XXXXX
- Vehicle registration: KL-55

Ananthavoor is a village in Tirur Thaluk Malappuram District of the state of Kerala, India.

== Demographics ==
As of the 2011 India census, Ananthavoor had a population of 21,058 with 9,714 males and 11,344 females. The village was a part of the Kingdom of Tanur (Vettattnad) in medieval times.

== Culture ==
Anantavur village is a predominantly Muslim populated area. Hindus are exist in comparatively smaller numbers. So the culture of the locality is based upon Muslim traditions. Duff Muttu, Kolkali and Aravanamuttu are common folk arts of this locality. There are many libraries attached to mosques giving a rich source of Islamic studies. Some of the books are written in Arabi-Malayalam which is a version of the Malayalam language written in Arabic script. People gather in mosques for the evening prayer and continue to sit there after the prayers discussing social and cultural issues. Business and family issues are also sorted out during these evening meetings. The Hindu minority of this area keeps their rich traditions by celebrating various festivals in their temples. Hindu rituals are done here with a regular devotion like other parts of Kerala.

== Transportation ==
Anantavur village connects to other parts of India through Tirur town. National highway 66 passes through valanchery and the northern stretch connects to Goa and Mumbai. The southern stretch connects to Cochin and Trivandrum. State Highway No.28 starts from Nilambur and connects to Ooty, Mysore and Bangalore through Highways.12,29 and 181. National Highway No.966 connects to Palakkad and Coimbatore. The nearest airport is at Karipur. The nearest major railway station is at Tirur.

== See also ==
- Vairankode vela
- Thirunavaya
- Vairankode
