= Chelakkode Punnathala =

Chelakkode Punnathala Chelakkode
- village
- Location in Kerala, India Chelakkode Punnathala (India)
- Coordinates: 10.940533°N 76.008512°E
- Country: India
- State: Kerala
- District: Malappuram

Government
  - Type: Panchayat Ward

Population (2001)
  - Total: 1,256

Languages
  - Official: Malayalam, English
- Time zone: UTC+5:30 (IST)
- PIN: 676 552
- Telephone code: 0494 254
- Vehicle registration: KL-55
- Nearest city: Puthanathani
- Lok Sabha constituency: Ponnani
- Vidhan Sabha constituency: Tirur

Chelakkode Punnathala is a village in Malappuram district in the state of Kerala, India

== Transport ==
The Village is connected to National Highway 66 (India), between Kottakkal and Valanchery.

== See also ==
- Athavanad Grama Panchayat
- Puthanathani
