= Ayyapanov Waterfalls =

Waterfall in Kerala, India

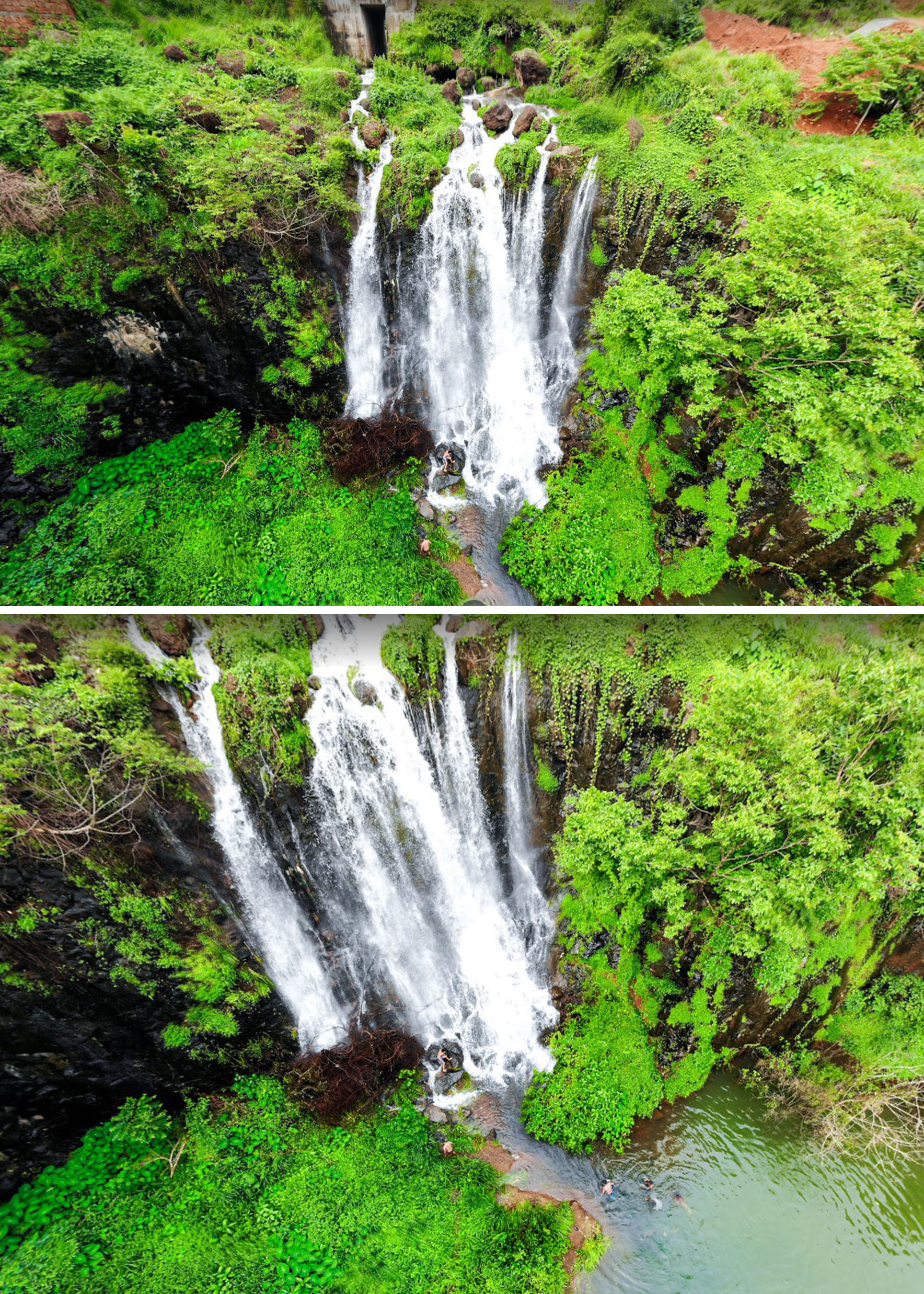
- Interactive map of Ayyapanov Waterfalls
- Location: Athavanad, Puthanathani, tirur Taluk, Malappuram District, Kerala, India
- Coordinates: 10.9011777°N 76.0150742°E
- Type: Segmented
- Elevation: 35 m (115 ft)
- Total height: 13 m (43 ft)
- Number of drops: 2
- Longest drop: 30 m (98 ft)
- Total width: 25 m (82 ft)
- Average flow rate: 18 m^{3}/s (1,836 cu ft/s)

Ayyappanov Waterfalls ( അയ്യപ്പനോവ്‌ വെള്ളച്ചാട്ടം ) is a Athavanad waterfall in the Athavanad village of Tirur taluk in Kerala, India. It is 4 kilometres (2.5 mi) from Puthanathani town, and attracts tourists from various parts of Kerala. This is a seasonal waterfall. During Summer, water flow is low.

== Notes and references ==
- Youth killed in Ayyappanov waterfalls | Kozhikode News - Times of India
- അയ്യപ്പനോവ് വെള്ളച്ചാട്ടം കാണാൻ വരുന്നവർ അപകടം ക്ഷണിച്ചുവരുത്തുന്നു
- കരിമ്പായിക്കോട്ട, പന്തീരായിരം ഏക്കർ വനം, നാടുകാണി ചുരം: കാഴ്ച്ചകളാൽ സമ്പന്നമാണ് മലപ്പുറം ജില്ല
