= Punnathala =

Communal Harmony Village in Kerala, India

- Communal Harmony Village
- Interactive map of Punnathala
- Coordinates: 10.943962°N 76.016746°E
- Country: India
- State: Kerala
- District: Malappuram

Government
  - Type: Gram panchayat Ward WARD NO.2,4(From Athavanad Panchayat) WARD NO.18,19(From Marakkara Grama Panchayat)
  - Body: Major Part Lies OnAthavanad Grama Panchayat and some Smaller parts Of Marakkara grama panchayat(because punnathala situated at Panchayat Boundary)

Population (2011)
  - Total: >3,500

Languages
  - Official: Malayalam, English
- Time zone: UTC+5:30 (IST)
- PIN: 676 552
- Telephone code: 0494 254
- Vehicle registration: KL-55
- Nearest city: Puthanathani
- Lok Sabha constituency: Ponnani
- Vidhan Sabha constituency: Tirur, Kottakkal

Punnathala is a Communal Harmony Village and Grama Panchayat ward in Malappuram, in the Indian state of Kerala, It is known for religious harmony. It is located on Near Puthanathani town . Hindus and Muslims come together there to follow tradition and celebrate festivals.

== Communal harmony ==
=== Iftar ===
A Hindu Muslim friendly feast in the Punnathala region comes during the month of Ramadan The Iftar feast is organized by the local Hindu community and the Lakshmi Narasimha Moorthy Vishnu Temple Committee.

== History ==
On 28 March 2019 Hindus and Muslims came together to form a joint forum to carry out protests against the controversial Citizenship (Amendment) Act, the National Population Register and the proposed all-India National Register of Citizens.

== Educational institutions ==
- Aided Mappila Upper Primary School Punnathala
- Albusthan Nursery
- Punnathala Anganvaadi(3)

== Religious Place ==
- Lakshmi Narasimha Moorthy Vishnu Temple Punnathala
- Punnathala Edamana Juma Masjid-Its the Mahhall&Head Juma Masjid Of Punnathala.
- Punnathala chelakode Juma Masjid-Mahall
- Punnathala Chirakkal Juma masjid-Mahall
- Koonath masjid
- Punnathala Town Masjid
- Mukkilappeedika masjid
- Ammengara Masjid
- Thottungal Masjid
- New Ek Madrasa Masjid

== Religious Institutions ==
The Punnathala area is known for its religious harmony. Hindu-Muslim unity is strong there. The Muslim community is the largest in the Punnathala area, followed by the Hindu community.

Among Muslims, Sunnis follow the Shafi'i school of thought. They believe in the Sunni principle of Ahlus Sunnah wal Jama'ah.They are part of the two Samasthas that lead it in Kerala. A large section is made up of the AP Samastha faction, followed by the EK Samastha faction. In Ap Faction Madrasas(under SAMASTHA KERALA SUNNI VIDHYABHYASA BOARD)

- Bisharatul Iqvan secondary Sunni Madrasa - old and prominent Madrasa In Punnathala Village.
- Hidayathul Islam Sunni Madrasa Ammengara
- CKMM Sunni Madrasa

EK Faction Madrasas (Under Samastha Kerala Islam Matha vidhyabhyasa board)

- Livaul Islam Madrasa punnathala -Newest and excellent academic In Duff Mutt artforms
- Sirajul Uloom Chelakkod Madrasa
- Dharussalam Madrasa Chirakkal
