= Azhvanchery Thamprakkal =

Title of feudal lords in Kerala, India

Azhvanchery Thamprakkal or Azhvanchery Samrāṭ (transl. The Azhvanchery Emperor) is the title of the senior-most male member of the Nambudiri Brahmin feudal lords of Azhvanchery Mana in Athavanad, Kerala, India. They had the right over Guruvayur, and were the titular head of all Nambudiri Brahmins of Kerala. The Lord of Azhvanchery based at Athavanad and the Lord of Kalpakanchery based at neighbouring Kalpakanchery were usually present at the coronation (Ariyittu Vazhcha) of a new Zamorin of Kozhikode. Kalpakanchery Thamprakkals were related to the Nambudiris of Panniyoor while Azhvanchery Thamprakkals to those of Chowwara.

== History ==
There are lots of theories as to how Nambudiri Brahmins came to settle in Kerala, the commonly accepted point of view is that they moved in from North India via Tulu Nadu or Karnataka. Another theory based on the retention of Mahabharata types as memorized by different Brahmin communities points to Tamil Nadu as the base from which they migrated to Kerala via the Palakkad Gap, which is also the largest opening in the southern Western Ghats, and settled around the river Bharathappuzha. The region around Coimbatore near Karnataka- western Tamil Nadu border was ruled by the Cheras during Sangam period between 1st and the 4th centuries CE and it served as the eastern entrance to the Palakkad Gap, the principal trade route between the Malabar Coast and Tamil Nadu. The Azhvanchery Thamprakkal originally had right over parts of present-day Palakkad Taluk. Later they moved westwards along the River Bharathappuzha and settled around the river. Finally the Azhvanchery Thamprakkal bought Athavanad-Tirunavaya region in present-day Tirur Taluk and gave Palakkad to Palakkad Rajas (Tarur Swaroopam) who were originally from Athavanad region. Many of the oldest Nambudiri settlements of Kerala are situated around the River Bharathappuzha. The Kingdom of Tanur, Kingdom of Valluvanad, Perumpadappu Swaroopam, and the kingdom of Palakkad, located around the river Bharathappuzha, were once strongholds of Nambudiris. The introduction of Grantha script which later got evolved into Malayalam script, and the evolution of Malayalam literature from Middle Tamil are highly related to the Brahmin migration.

== Position in Indian social order ==
The Azhvanchery Thamprakkals were also temporally, the rulers of Athavanad: The name Athavanad is believed to be derived from them or vice versa. Before abolition of the princely-order of government, The Azhvanchery Thamprakkal was considered as the supreme religious head of Kerala Brahmins. His presence was required for the anointing of the Thachudaya Kaimal of Travancore, the Yogathiripad of Thrissur and the ruling chiefs of South India

The Thamprakkals were great patrons of mathematics and astronomy. The Kerala School of Astronomy and Mathematics flourished between 14th and 16th centuries of Common Era in Tirur-Tirunavaya-Triprangode region on the bank of the river Bharathappuzha. In the famous work Brahmandapuranam, of poet Thunchath Ezhuthachan, Azhvanchery Thamprakkals had been mentioned with the title "Netranarayanan".

== Title and Privileges ==
The title of Thamprakkal literally means Emperor. It came to be used to refer to the Brahmins of Azhvanchery Mana family. The story according to popular lore is that while returning from the coronation ceremony of Kulashekhara Perumal with the gift of a golden-cow, the Thamprakkal was stopped on the road by Pakkanar, a person of low caste. He claimed that it was the exclusive right of his castemen to take dead cows. The Thamprakkal, affronted, sprinkled water on the golden cow and brought it to life. The low caste man exclaimed "You are indeed a Thamprakkal" and since then the title has stayed with the family.

The Thamprakkal had four privileges within the Hindu Social Order of Kerala.

- Bhadrasthanam: The chief seat in any assembly
- Sarvamanyam: Universal respectability
- Brahma Samrajyam: Sovereignty over all Brahmins
- Brahmavarchas: Highest authority in Vedic learning

The opinion of the Azhvanchery Thamprakkal was considered supreme in deciding matters relating to religion, caste, society etc. Only the anointed head of the family received the title. The junior members of the family are ordinary Adhyan Namboodiris and use the style of Namboodiripad.

== See also ==
- Parasurama
- Namboodiri
- Nair
- Kerala
- Malappuram
- Kingdom of Tanur (Vettattnad)
- Athavanad Grama Panchayat
- Athavanad
- Vairankode Vela
- Vairankode Bhagavathy Temple
