= Mohsin Peramban =

Indian motorcycle rider

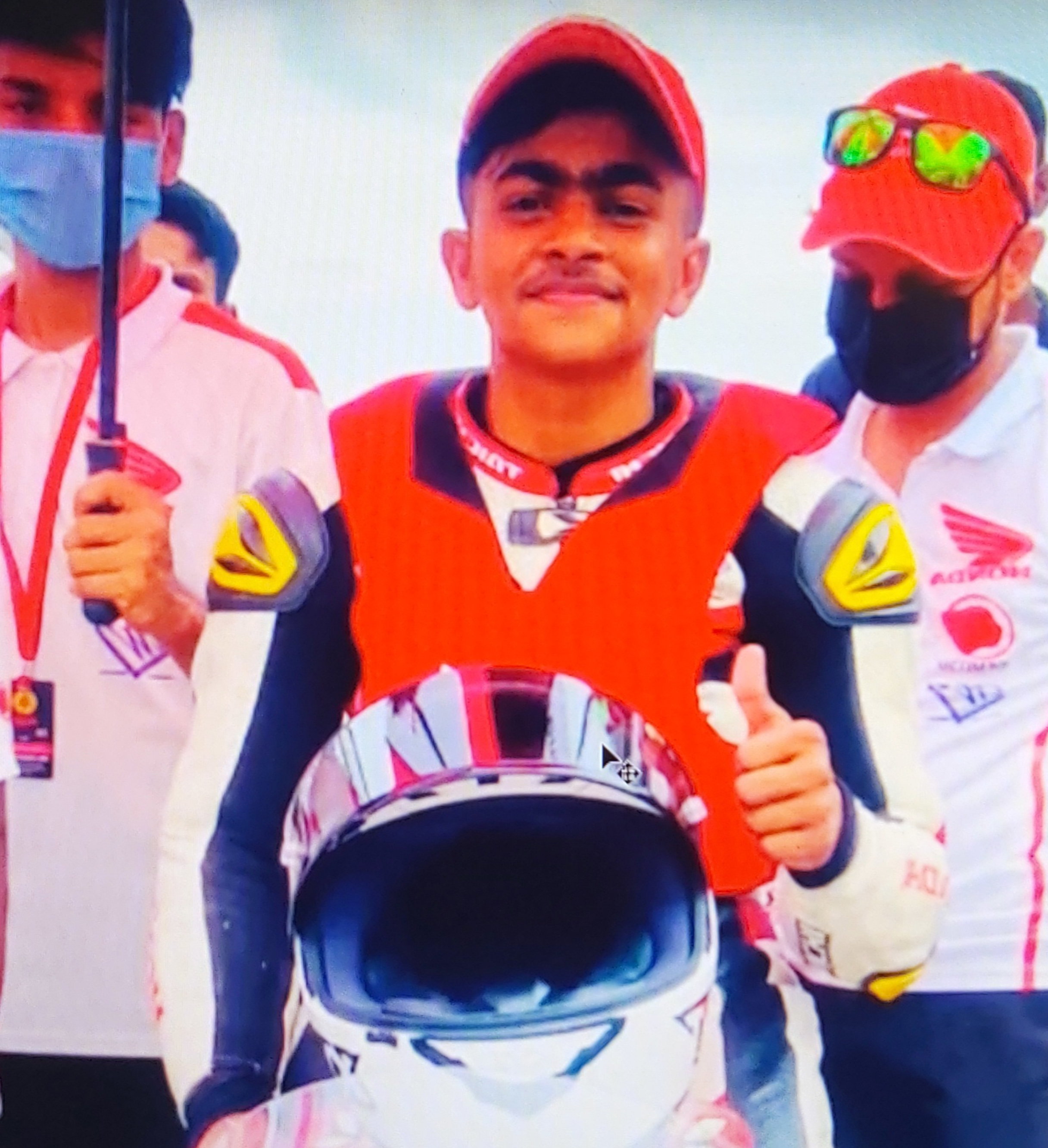
- National Motorcycle Racing 2021
- Nationality: (India) Indian
- Born: 30 May 2002; Athavanad, Kerala, India
- Current team: Honda Racing India
- Bike number: 6

Mohsin Peramban also known as Mohsin P, Mohsin Valanchery& BikerKid (born 30 May 2002 in Athavanad Malappuram district Kerala, India. was an Indian professional motorcycle racer. National Motorcycle Racing 2021 in 2018, and in 2021 became the first Kerala winner of an National Motorcycle Racing event with his victory at the National Motorcycle Racing Championship 2021 in Chennai.

== Early life ==
Mohsin was born on 30 May 2002 in Rahat Nagar. Athavanad ( Near Valanchery) Malappuram district Kerala, India. The son of Mr Musthafa Peramban & Mrs Sakeena. He is a Plus Two Computer Science student in an MSM Higher secondary school Kallingalparambu 2021

== Career ==
He is starting his career in the 2018 race at the Madras Motor Race Track in Chennai Third place in the draw. 32 km in the laps on a 4 km long track he completes the distance in the best time Third, in MRF MMSC All India Motorcycle Championship from Chennai won the seat. One of the oldest Chennai clubs in India Muhsin won the all-India bike race at the Madras Sports Club Recognized. Muhsin was in the NNF category. Of the Honda NSF250R, he finished the race on a bike. There are only 10 people in India This bike is in use. Mohsin is one of them. The competitor is Honda Sponsored by‌. The only one from Kerala to receive such sponsorship Muhsin is a contestant

== Achievements & awards ==
- Idemitsu Honda India Talent Cup Open NSF 250R won the second race

Year	Class	Team	Machine	Points	Rank	Wins
2021	Honda Racing India	National Motorcycle Racing 2021-Honda	Honda NSF250R	9	8	2
