= Vairankode Vela =

Annual temple festival in Kerala, India

Vairankode Vela വൈരങ്കോട് വേല
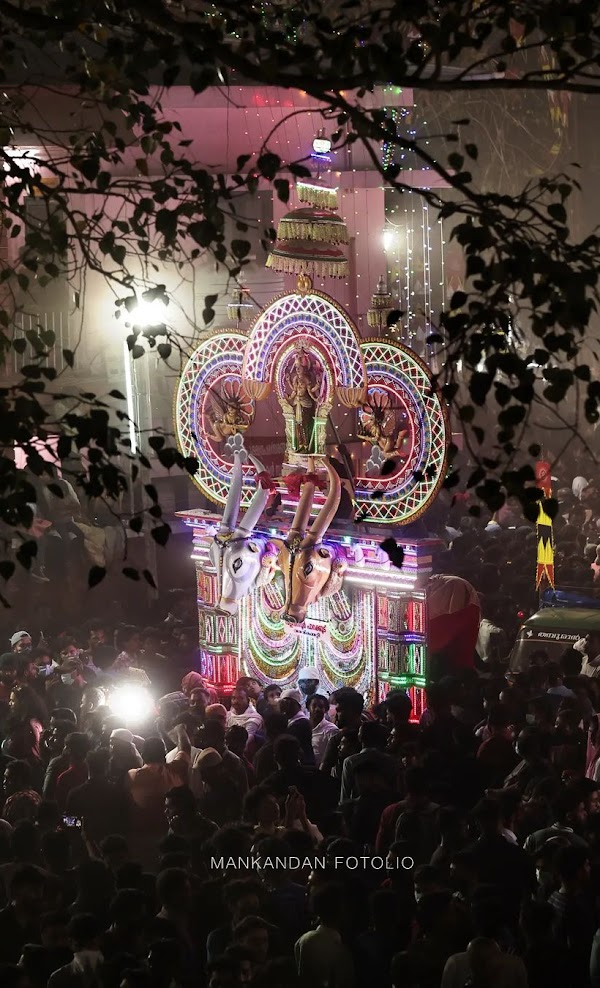
- Status: Active
- Begins: 17 February 2026 (Tuesday)
- Ends: 20 February 2026 (Friday)
- Frequency: Once every year
- Venue: Vairankode Bhagavathy Temple
- Locations: Vairankode, Tirur
- Coordinates: 10.886454°N 75.976120°E
- Country: India
- Founder: Azhvanchery Thamprakkal
- Most recent: 20 February 2026
- Previous event: February 2024
- Next event: 20 February 2026 / 9 Kumbham
- Major events: Temple festival, Melam, Poothan, Thira, Kattalan, Pulikali, Eratta Kaala, Theyyam, Karinkali
- Patron: Azhvanchery Thamprakka
- Organiser: Vairankode Bhagavathy Devaswom
- Sponsor: Malabar Devaswom Board
- Summer
- The annual festival in the shrine is observed in the Kumbham month (February in the Gregorian calendar).

The Vairankode Festival (Malayalam: വൈരങ്കോട് വേല, വൈരങ്കോട് തീയാട്ടുൽസവം), also known as Vairankode Vela or Vairankode Theeyattulsavam, is an annual celebration held at the Vairankode Bhagavathy Temple near Thirunavaya in the Malappuram district, Kerala. It is dedicated to the goddess Bhadra Kaali.

== Festival ==
'Marammuri', the beginning of the temple festival, takes place only with the permission of the Koima of the Thamprakkal. The Koima then supervises all the ceremonies related to the temple festival and conducts the Ariyalav as part of the closing ceremony of the festival. Athavanad, the main flag- beavered (കൊടിവരവ് kodivarau) of the Vairankode festival, depart for Vairankode after receiving the blessings of Azhvanchery Mana floats (വരവ് varavu) and Thamprakkal.

== Cultural influences ==
The temple is traditionally decorated with plantain, coconut leaves, flowers, leaves, traditional lamps and lights.
