= Athavanad Gram Panchayat =

Athavanad Grama Panchayat
- Grama Panchayat
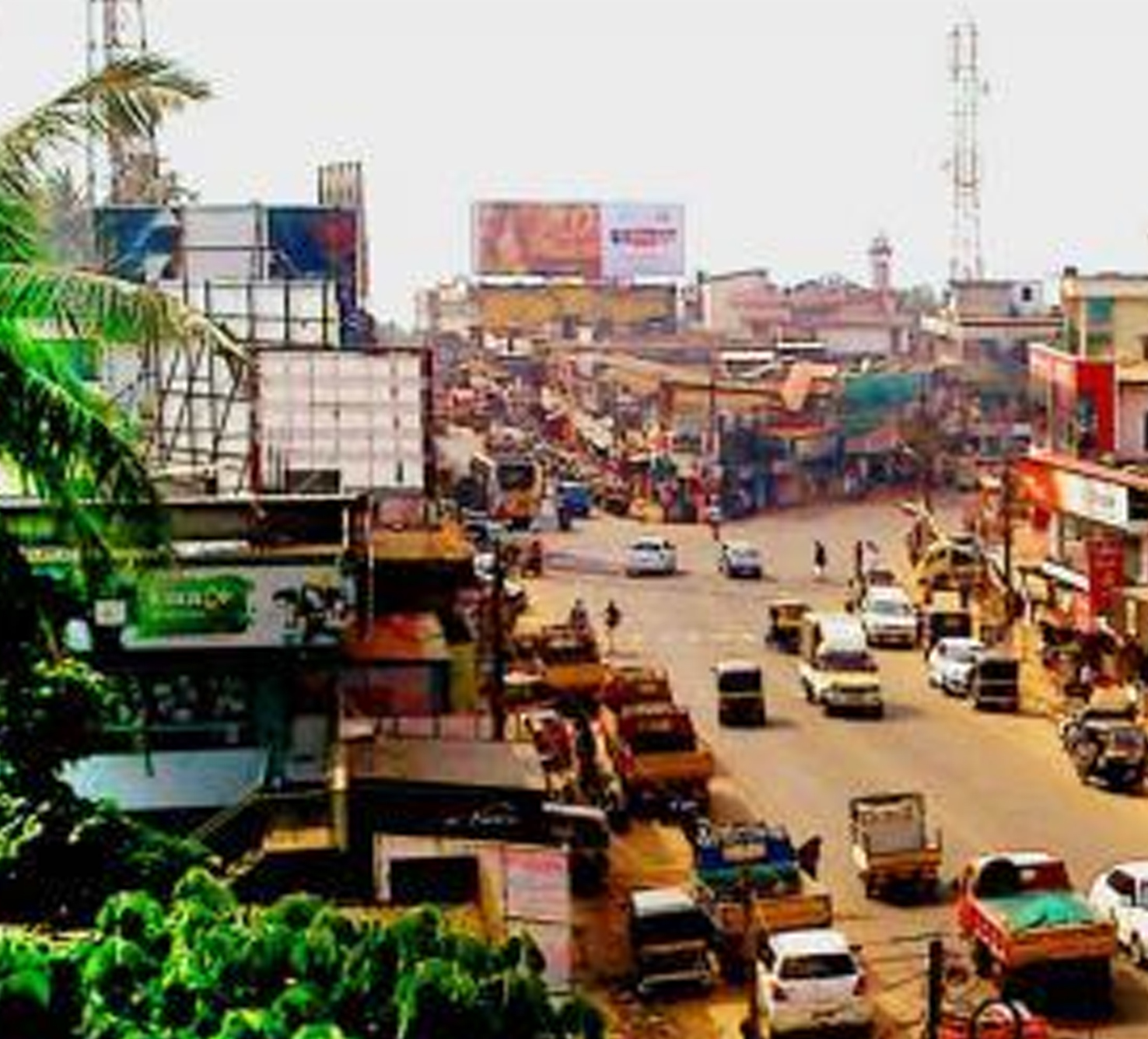
- Puthanathani, Athavanad

- Location in Kerala, India Athavanad Grama Panchayat (India)
- Coordinates: 10.905870°N 76.0251400°E
- Country: India
- State: Kerala
- District: Malappuram

Government
  - Type: Grama Panchayat
  - Body: Athavanad Grama Panchayat
  - Panchayat President: Sinobiya (IUML)
  - Vice President: HARIS KT

Population (2011)
  - Total: 41,187
- PIN: 676552

Athavanad is a village and Grama Panchayat in the Malappuram district, the Indian state of Kerala.

== Geography ==
Puthanathani is the main town there, sited on National Highway 17 between Kottakkal and Valanchery. Roads to Vailathur (and hence Tirur) and Thirunavaya run through Puthanathani. Many people from Puthanathani and surrounding areas work overseas, mostly in Persian Gulf countries.

== History ==
In ancient times, the region was under the feudal lords Azhvanchery Thamprakkal. In Malayalam, "Athavanad" is the abbreviation of "Azhvanchery Thambrakkal Vazhunna Nadu". The Zamorin of Calicut also controlled the area.

== Demographics ==
As of the 2011 Census of India, Athavanad had a population of 41187, with 19298 males and 21889females.

== Athavanad Grama Panchayat Election 2020 ==
S.No.	Party name	Party symbol	Number of Ward Members
01	UDF		11
02	LDF		10
03	Sdpi		01

== Local Administration 2020 ==
The region is administered by the Athavanad Grama Panchayat. It is composed of 22 wards:

Ward	Name	Party	Alliance	Member
1	Puthanathani	IUML	UDF	Suhra Arikadan
2	Punnathala	IUML	UDF	Jasar Karingappara
3	Chirakkal	IUML	UDF	Sinobiya
4	Vettichira	IUML	UDF	KT Rubeena Jasmin
5	Kambivalapp	IUML	UDF	Shahina Basheer Thiruthi
6	Karippol	CPIM	LDF	Ashraf Neyyathoor
7	Pattrakallu	CPIM.	LDF	Fousiya Shahul Hameed
8	Chottoor	IUML	UDF	Saleena
9	Parappuram	CPIM.	LDF	Najmath
10	Parithi	CPIM.	LDF	KP. Pavitran
11	Kavungal	INC	UDF	Hareesh KT
12	Kattilangadi	CPIM.	LDF	Sreeja Malayath
13	Mannekkara	IUML	UDF	Suneera
14	AKK Nagar	IUML	UDF	Munjakkal Rajeena
15	Yatheemkhana Nagar	IUML	UDF	Shihabudheen Athikkattil
16	Kurumbathoor	CPIM.	LDF	Munjakkal Musthafa
17	Kattamkunnu	IUML	UDF	Ibrahim
18	Koodassery	IUML	UDF	Nasar Pulikkal
19	Karuvanpadi	CPIM.	LDF	Shijil MP
20	Cheloor	CPIM.	LDF	Karingappara Rubeena
21	Kuttikalathani	CPIM.	LDF	Kunjahmmed
22	Pallippara		SDPI	SDPI|Zakariya Puthanathani

== Culture ==
Athavanad village is predominantly a Muslim area. Hindus exist in comparatively smaller numbers. People gather in mosques for prayers and remain after prayers to discuss social and cultural issues.

Business and family issues are also sorted out during evening meetings. The Hindu minority of this area keeps their rich traditions by celebrating various festivals in their temples. In Athavanad, Hindu rituals are done with a regular devotion, as in other parts of Kerala.

== Transport ==
Athavanad village connects to other parts of India through the town of valanchery. National highway No.66 passes through valanchery and the northern stretch connects to Goa and Mumbai. The southern stretch connects to Cochin and Trivandrum.

State Highway No.28 starts from Nilambur and connects to Ooty, Mysore and Bangalore through Highways.12,29 and 181. National Highway No.966 connects to Palakkad and Coimbatore. The nearest airport is at Kozhikode. The nearest major railway station is at Tirur.

== Education ==
The village has several educational institutions, from the school level to higher education. Institutions include:

- AMUPS poolamangalam
- AMUPS Punnathala
- Athavanad Mattummal Higher Secondary School
- Athavanad Parithi High school
- Athavanadu
- Badariyya Arabic college Palathani
- GMHS Karippol
- Gups Karipol
- Hifz college
- Kattilangadi yatheemkhana higher secondary school
- KMCT Law College
- KMCT Polytechnic College
- Majmau Da'awa College
- Majmau Higher secondary school
- Majmau Lower Primary School
- Majmau Orphanage
- Majmau Shareeath College
- Majmau Thazkiyyathul Islamia Hiflul Quran College
- Majmau Thazkiyyathul Islamia
- Markaz Arts And Science College Karthala
- Markaz Residential School
- Markazu Tharbiyathul Islam
- Markazu Tharbiyathul Islam B-Ed
- Markazu Tharbiyathul Islam Higher Secondary School
- Markazu Tharbiyathul Teachers Training Center
- Mohammed Ali Shihab Thangal Memorial Arts And Science College
- PMSA ASMI School
- PMSA orphanage hospital athavanad kattilangadi
- PMSA WAFI College
- ZMHS Poolamangalam

== Ayyappanov waterfalls ==
Ayyappanov Waterfalls is an Athavanad waterfall in the Athavanad village of Tirur taluk in Kerala, India. It is 4 kilometers from Puthanathani town and attracts tourists from various parts of Kerala. This is a seasonal waterfall. During Summer, water flow is low

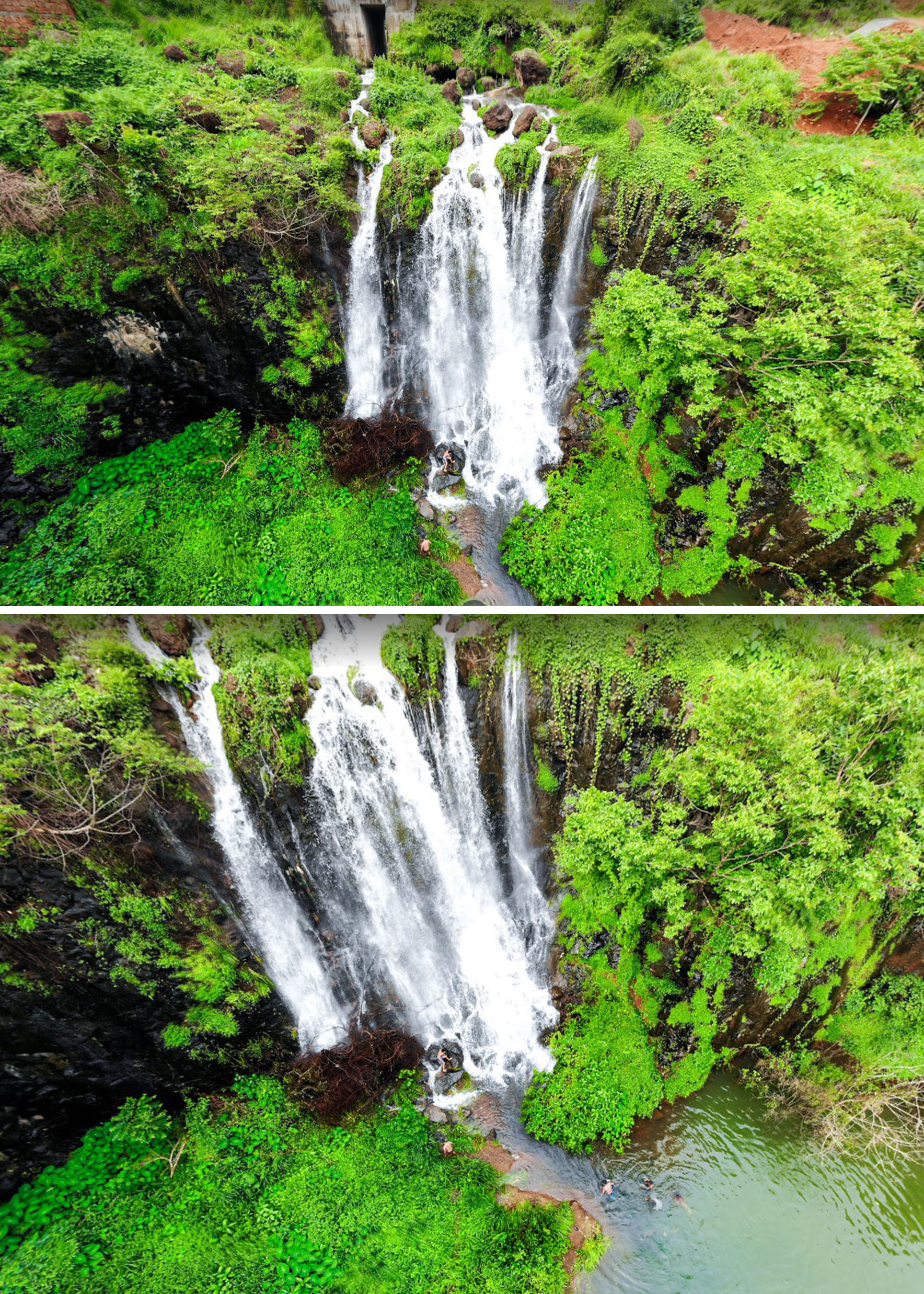
Ayyappanov waterfalls

== See also ==
- Kuttippuram Block Panchayat
