= Tirunnavaya railway station =

Rail station in Kerala, India

Tirunnavaya
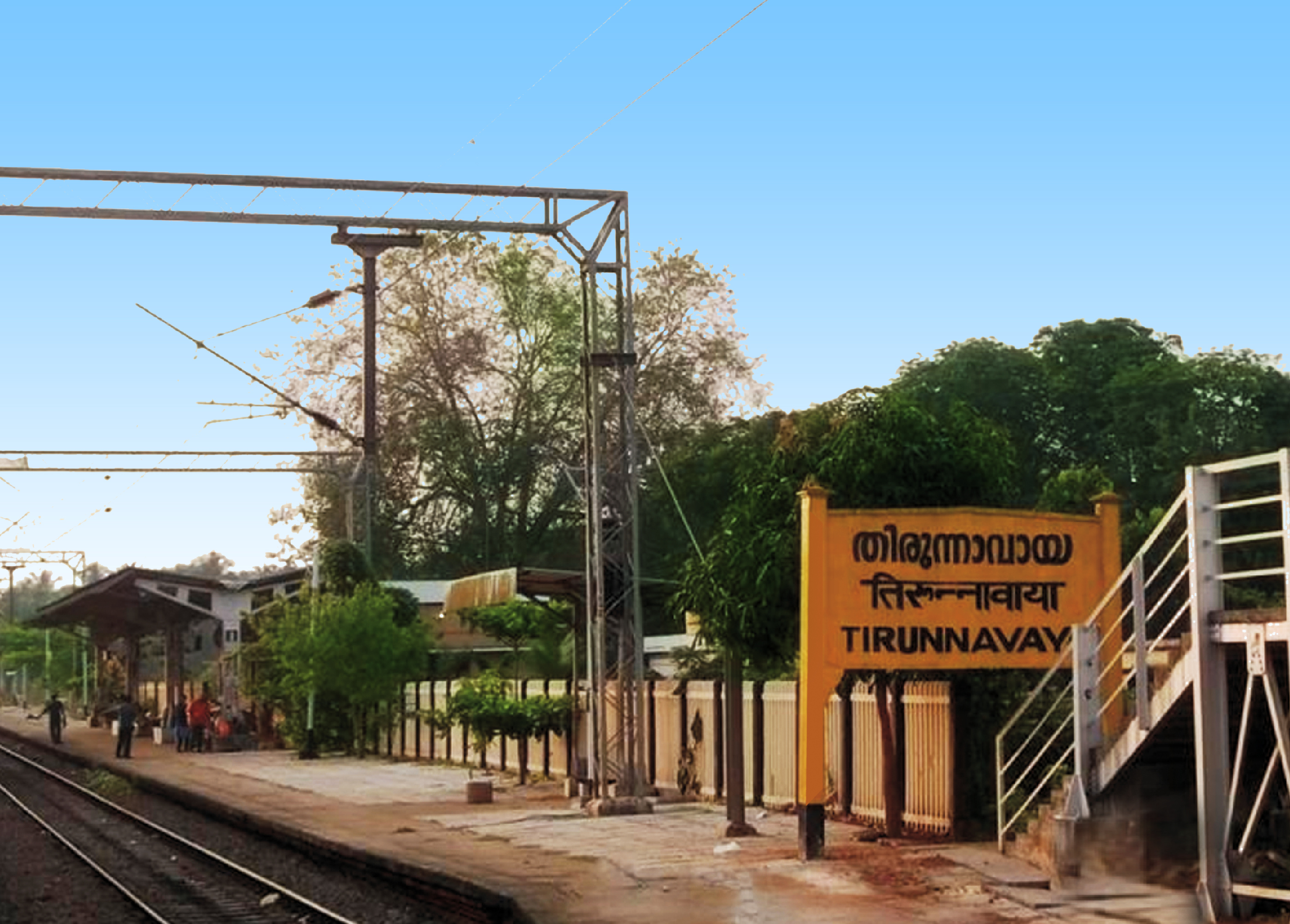
- തിരുന്നാവായ

General information
- Location: Tirunavaya,Tirur, Malappuram, Kerala; India
- Coordinates: 10.875°N 75.985°E
- Elevation: 9 metres (30 ft)
- System: Express train and Passenger train station
- Owner: Indian Railways
- Operator: Southern Railway
- Line: Shoranur–Mangalore section
- Platforms: 2
- Tracks: 4
- Connections: Auto rickshaw stand

Construction
- Structure type: Standard (on ground station)
- Parking: Yes, on both sides

Other information
- Status: Functioning
- Station code: TUA
- Zone(s): Southern Railway zone
- Division(s): Palakkad

History
- Opened: 1862 June 3
- Closed: 1903
- Rebuilt: 2011

Passengers
- 50,000: 600 ▲45%
Route map
Location
- Location within India Location within Kerala

Tirunnavaya railway station (station code: TUA) is an NSG–6 category Indian railway station in Palakkad railway division of Southern Railway zone. It is the railway station located at Edakkulam-Tirunavaya,Tirur, Malappuram, Kerala. The station code of Tirunnavaya is TUA (Code:TUA). It is a major railway station serving the town of Tirunavaya and Puthanathani in Malappuram district of Kerala.

== History ==
Tirunavaya is a popular tourist destination located at a distance of eight km (5.0 mi) south of Tirur in Malappuram district. The place is located on the banks of the Nila River. Tirunavaya Railway Station is located at Edakulam in Tirunavaya Grama Panchayat. Many years ago, Edakkulam was the largest trading center in the panchayat. This area played an important role in the Malabar Rebellion (1921) during the freedom struggle. Protesters were imprisoned by British troops at the site. When Hermann Gundert arrived at the Edakulam railway station from Kozhikode, he was brought to Kodakal in a bullock cart by a man named Puzhakkal Mohammad. When Thavanur Manakkal Vasudevan was a member of the Namboothiri District Board, the Edakulam railway station was renamed Tirunavaya.

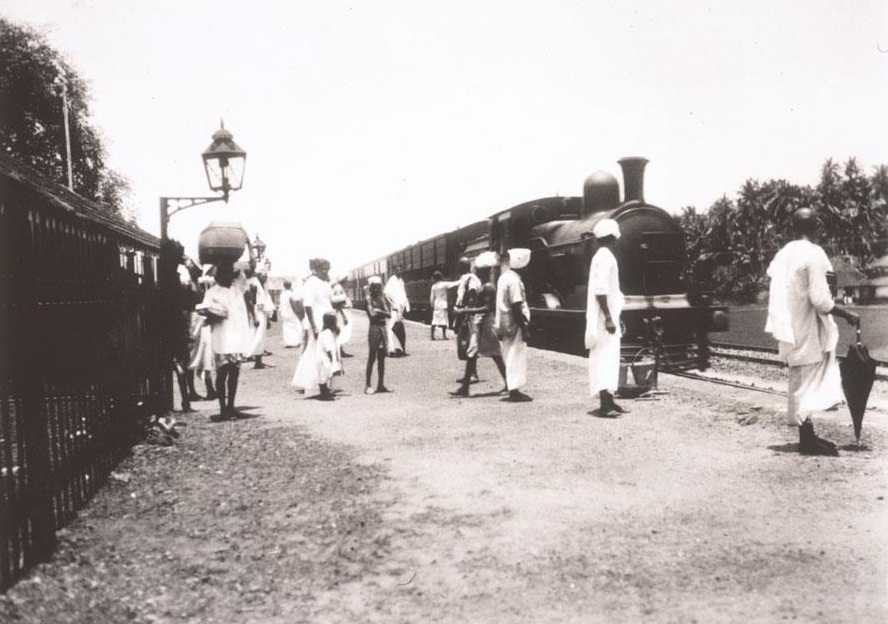
Edakulam railway station

== Goods shed ==
The Southern Railway opened goods shed at the Thirunavaya station to facilitate smooth loading and unloading. the loading and unloading work would involve frequent shunting of goods wagons, which may cause closure of the adjacent level-crossing gate for enhanced durations.

== Features ==
Thirunavaya railway station is located between Tirur railway station and Kuttipuram station. It is six meters above sea level. There are two platforms with electrified tracks. Fourteen trains stop here. Most of these are passenger trains.The railway station is located at a distance of two km (1.2 mi) from Thirunavaya Navamukunda Temple.

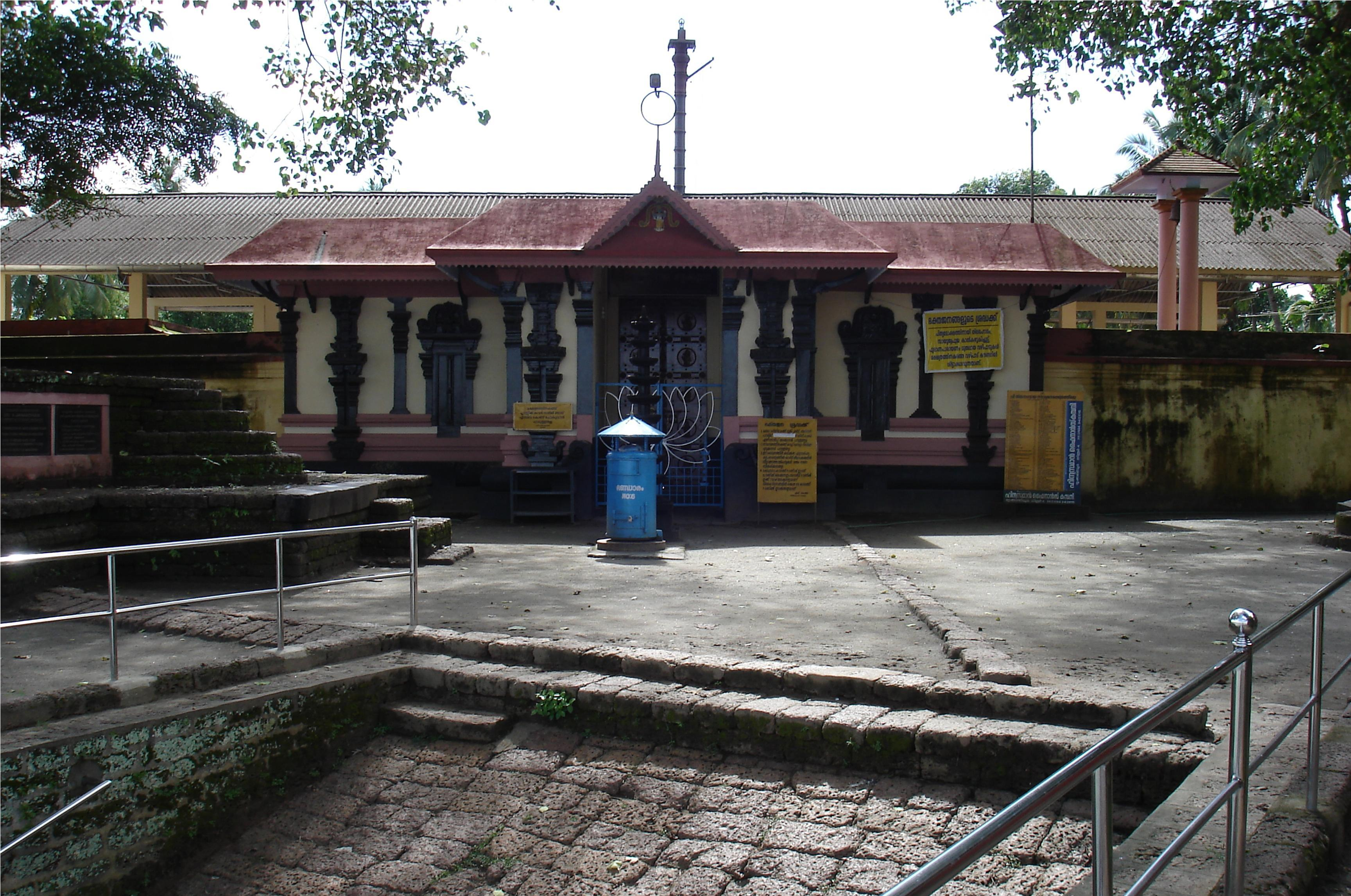
Thirunavaya Navamukunda Temple

== See also ==
- Mangalore Mail
- Tirur
- Malappuram
- Malappuram district
- Transportation in Malappuram district
- Tirunavaya
- Puthanathani
