= Puthanathani =

- Census town
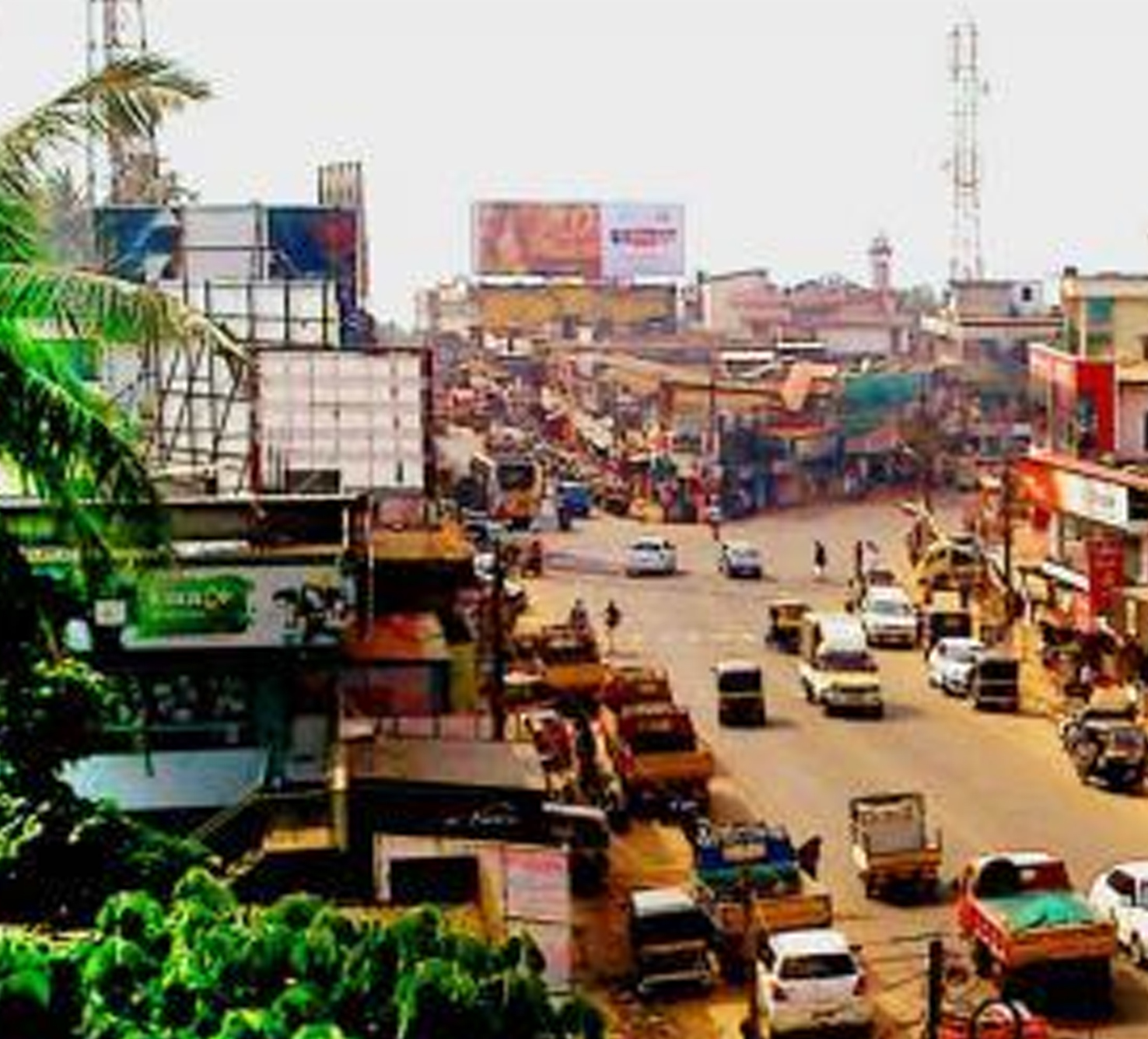
- Central Junction Puthanathani

- Location in Kerala, India Puthanathani (India)
- Coordinates: 10.9346595°N 76.0037939°E
- Country: India
- State: Kerala
- District: Malappuram

Government
  - Type: Panchayat
  - Body: Gram panchayat
  - Athavanad Grama Panchayat (Malappuram) Member: Suhra Areekadan

Population (2011)
  - Total: 20,480

Language
  - Official: Malayalam, English
- Time zone: UTC+5:30 (IST)
- PIN: 676552
- Telephone code: 91494
- Vehicle registration: KL-10, KL-55
- Nearest Town: Tirur, Kottakkal, Valanchery
- Sex ratio: 1073 ♂/♀
- Literacy: 92.97%
- Lok Sabha constituency: Ponnani
- Vidhan Sabha constituency: Tirur

Puthanathani is a town in Malappuram district in the state of Kerala, India. The town lies on the National Highway 66 (India), between Kottakkal and Valanchery. Roads to Vailathur (and hence Tirur) and Thirunavaya also can be seen in Puthanathani.

== Demographics ==
The Indian census of 2011 revealed that in that year, Puthanathani had a population of 20,480, with 10,000 males and 10,480 females. A good number of people from Puthanathani and around are now working overseas, mostly in the Gulf countries.

== Culture ==
Puthanathani is a predominantly Muslim populated area. Business and family issues are also sorted out during these evening meetings. The Hindu minority of this area keeps their rich traditions by celebrating various festivals in their temples. Hindu rituals are done here with a regular devotion like other parts of Kerala.

== Basic information about Puthanathani ==
Puthanathani

| Area | 10.43 km^{2} (4.03 sq mi) |
| Panchayath | Athavanad Grama Panchayat |
| Taluk | Tirur |
| Town in | Malappuram metropolitan area |
| Assembly Constituency | Tirur |
| Loksabha Constituency | Ponnani |
| Neighbouring Panchayaths | Kalpakanchery, Marakkara |
| Post Offices | Punnathala, Kalpakanchery |

== Transportation ==
Puthanathani connects to other parts of India through Kottakkal and Valanchery towns. National Highway No.66 passes through Kottakkal and Valanchery and the northern stretch connects to Goa and Mumbai. The southern stretch connects to Cochin and Trivandrum. State Highway No.28 starts from Nilambur and connects to Ooty, Mysore, and Bangalore through Highways.12,29, and 181. National Highway No.966 connects to Palakkad and Coimbatore. The nearest airport is at Calicut International Airport. The nearest major railway station is at Tirur and the nearest minor railway station is Tirunnavaya railway station

== Educational institutions ==
There are many schools both private and government and 4 colleges & 1 polytechnic in Puthanathani.

| Name | Type | Sector |
|---|---|---|
| CPA College of Arts And Science Puthanathani | Professional College | Govt |
| Learners College Puthanathani | Professional | Private |
| Guide College, Puthanathani | Professional | Private |
| Luminous Arts & Science College Vettichira, Puthanathani | Professional | Private |
| AKM ITC & College Of Engineering | ITC | Govt. |
| MES Central School Puthanthani | Higher Secondary School | Private |
| AMLP SCHOOL PUTHANTHANI | LP School | Govt |
| Aliya English School Puthanathani | LKG & UKG | Pvt |

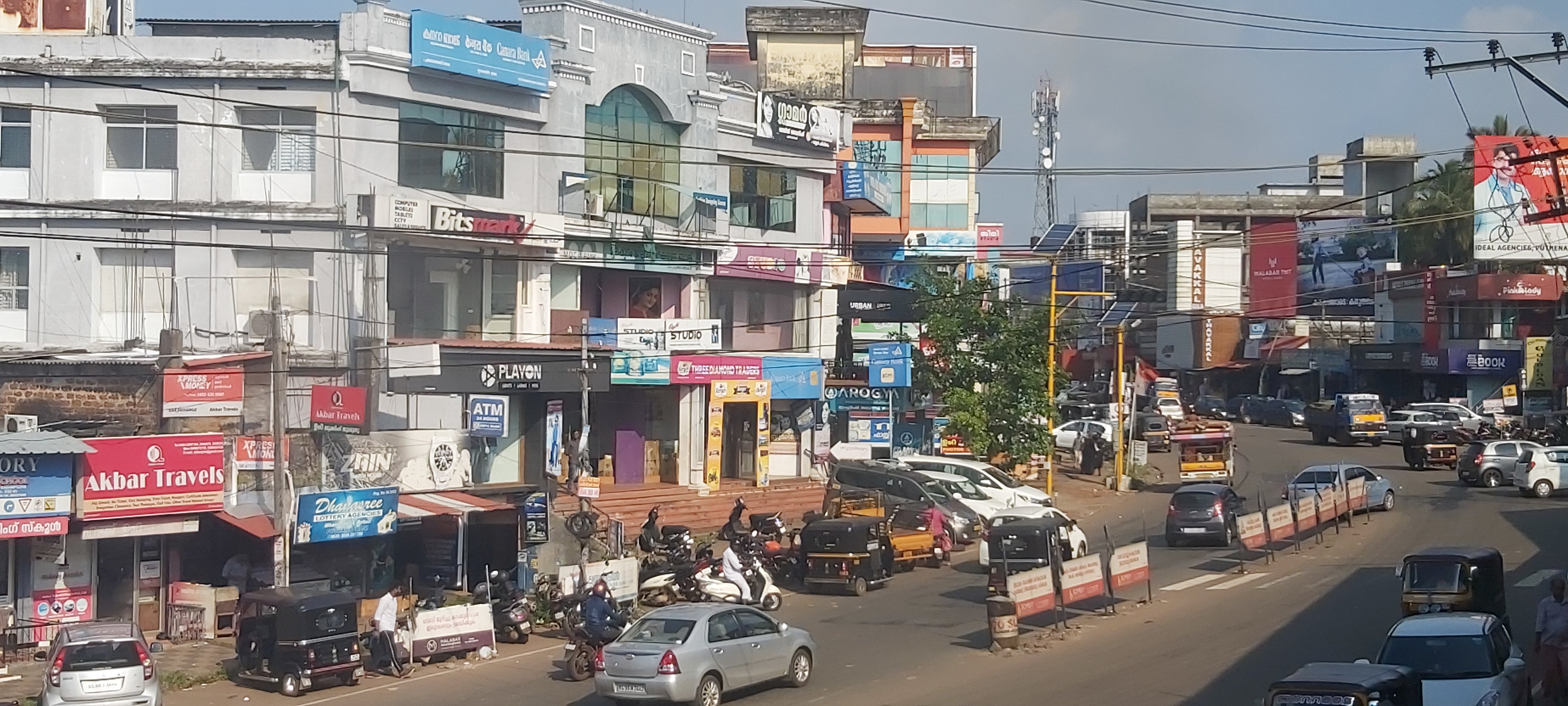
Puthanathani Town

== Places of interest ==
- Ayyapanov Waterfalls waterfalls situated at Athavanad near Puthanathani
- Chelakkode Punnathala
- Punnathala
- Athirumada
- Cheloor, Malappuram
- Cherulal
- Chungam, Malappuram
- Jamalullaily Juma Masjid Cheloor
- Kallingal, Malappuram
- Kanmanam
- Kurumbathoor
- Kuttikalathani
- Manjachola juma masjith
- Narasimha Moorthy Temple Punnathala
- Nellithadam View Point
- Padiyath Gulminar
- Puthanathani Darga

== Hospitals ==
- Supriya Speciality Hospital (SSH)
- PMSA Orphanage Hospital
- BDS HOSPITAL
- NHC polyclinic and dialysis center

== See also ==
- Thunchath Ezhuthachan Malayalam University
