= Thirunavaya Navamukunda Temple =

Hindu temple in Kerala, India

Thirunavaya Temple
- Tirunavaya Navamukunda Temple
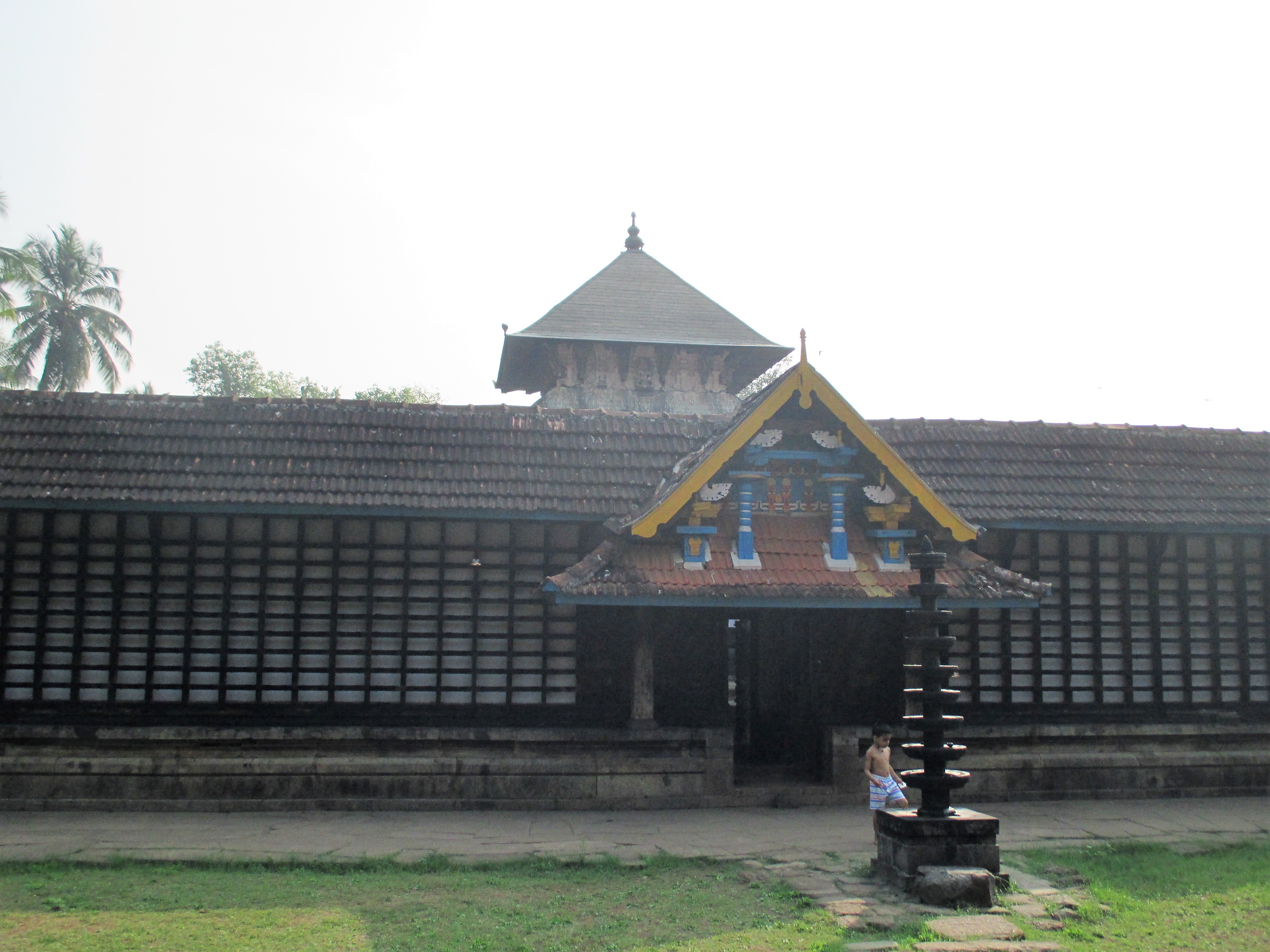
- Tirunavaya Navamukunda Temple

- Navamukunda Temple, Thirunavaya, Malappuram, Kerala, India

Religion
- Affiliation: Hinduism
- District: Malappuram
- Deity: Navamukunda (Vishnu)

Location
- Location: Tirunavaya, Tirur, Kerala
- State: Kerala
- Country: India
- Coordinates: 10.863719°N 75.981761°E

Architecture
- Type: Kerala Temple Architecture

Specifications
- Temple: One
- Elevation: 28.8 m (94 ft)

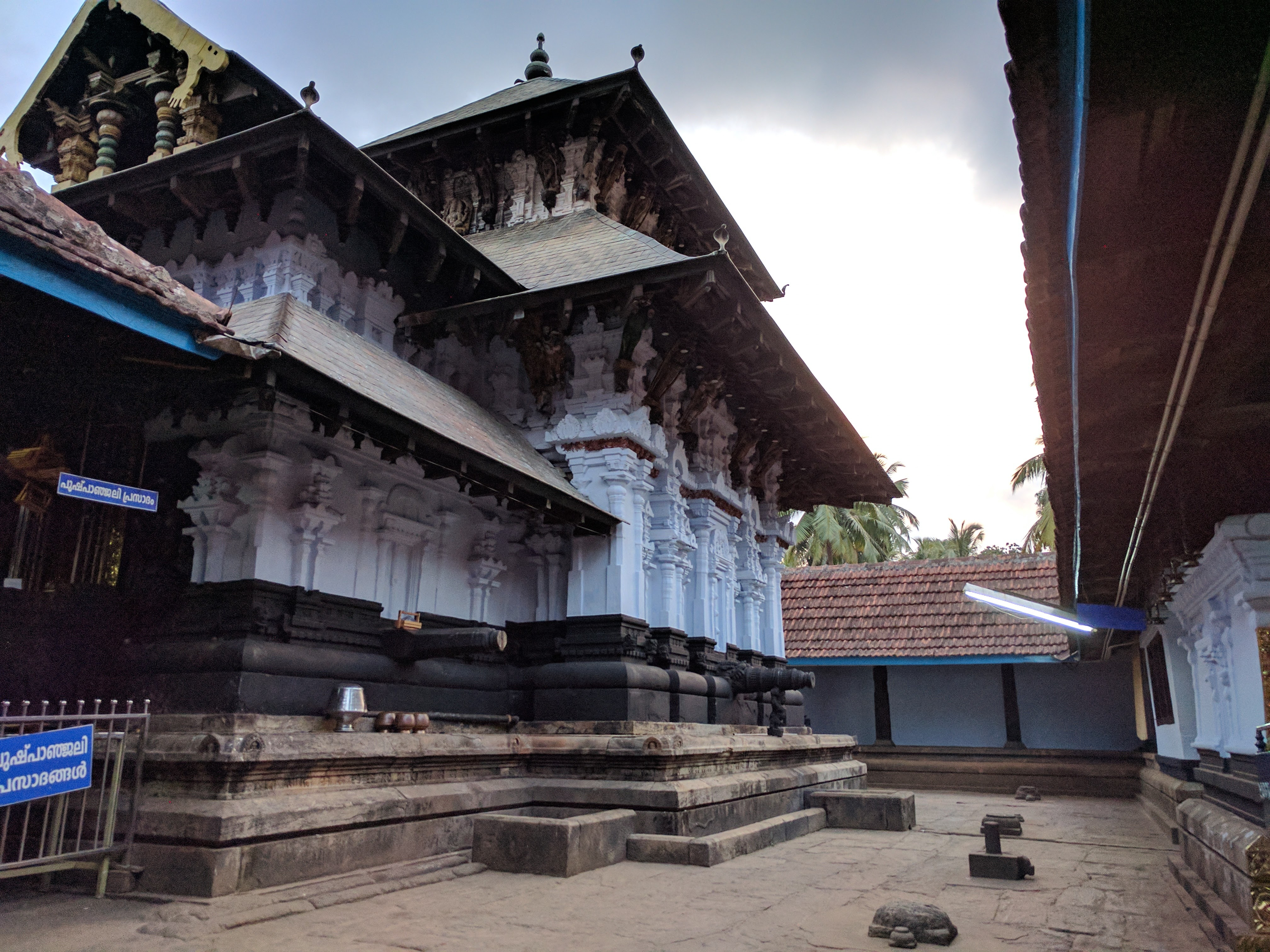

Tirunavaya Temple (in full Tirunavaya Navamukunda Temple) is an ancient Hindu temple at Tirunavaya, central Kerala, India, on the northern bank of the Bharatappuzha (River), dedicated to Navamukundan (Narayana-Vishnu).

The temple is glorified in Divya Prabandha, an early medieval Tamil collection of hymns by the Vaishnava Alvars. It is one of the 108 Divya Desams dedicated to god Vishnu, who is worshipped as Navamukunda Perumal at Tirunavaya. The temple has no pond or well, and water from the river is used for all rituals. The presence of Cherutirunavaya Brahma - Siva Temples across the River Ponnani at Tavanur makes it a Trimurti sangama. The river bank in the temple are considered as holy as Kasi and the ritual offering practices for forefathers (bali tarpana/sradha puja) are similar to the ones done there. Ganapati (Adi Ganesa/Gajendra), Lakshmi ("Malarmangai Nachiyar") and Ayyappa Swami are the associated pratishthas. Goddess Lakshmi has a separate sri kovil in the temple, unlike most of the other Narayana-Lakshmi temples.

The temple was the venue of the Mamankams, a festival celebrated once in 12 years from at least the 8th century CE. The temple building was attacked and destroyed during the invasion of Kerala by Sultan of Mysore Tipu (18th century CE), and later attacked in 1921 during the Mappila Rebellion. The present temple building is constructed in the indigenous Kerala Temple Architecture style.

Presently, the Tirunavaya temple (Malappuram Division, Grade: Sp) is administered by Samutiri of Kozhikode (Zamorin of Calicut) as the managing trustee under Malabar Devaswom Board, Government of Kerala. The temple is open from 05.00 am to 10.00 am and 04.00 pm to 07.00 pm on all days leaving festive days.

== Legends ==
The Vishnu is called "Navamukunda Perumal/Tevar" as it is believed that the idol was the ninth one to be installed in the temple by a group of nine Hindu yogis known as "Navayogis". The first eight idols sank into the Earth as soon as they were placed there and the ninth sank to its knees before it was forcibly stopped. As the location of the sunken idols were not known, devotees used to make pradikshina on their knees. Even Alvancheri Tamparakkal and Tirunavaya Vaddhyans were not exempted from this practice. Tirunavaya is also known as called "Navayogisthala".

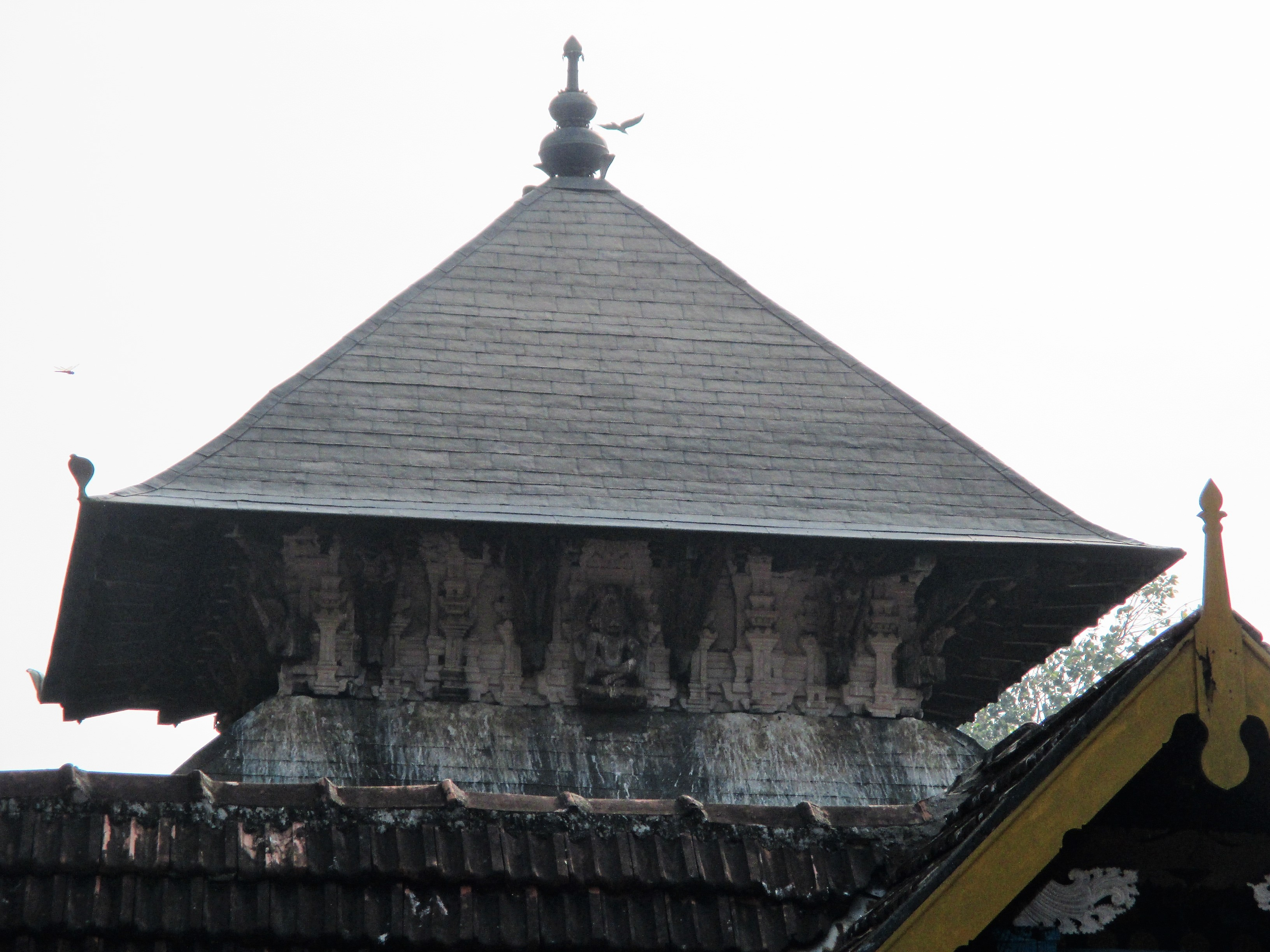
Tirunavaya Temple

According to the legends, goddess Lakshmi and Gajendra, the king of the elephants, worshiped god Vishnu here with lotus flowers from a lake nearby; with the two devotees using flowers from the same source, its supply dwindled, and Gajendra appealed to Vishnu, who took Lakshmi by his side on the same throne and accepted worship offered by Gajendra.

== Architecture ==
The present temple is built in Kerala Temple Architecture style, which is almost common in all temples in Kerala.

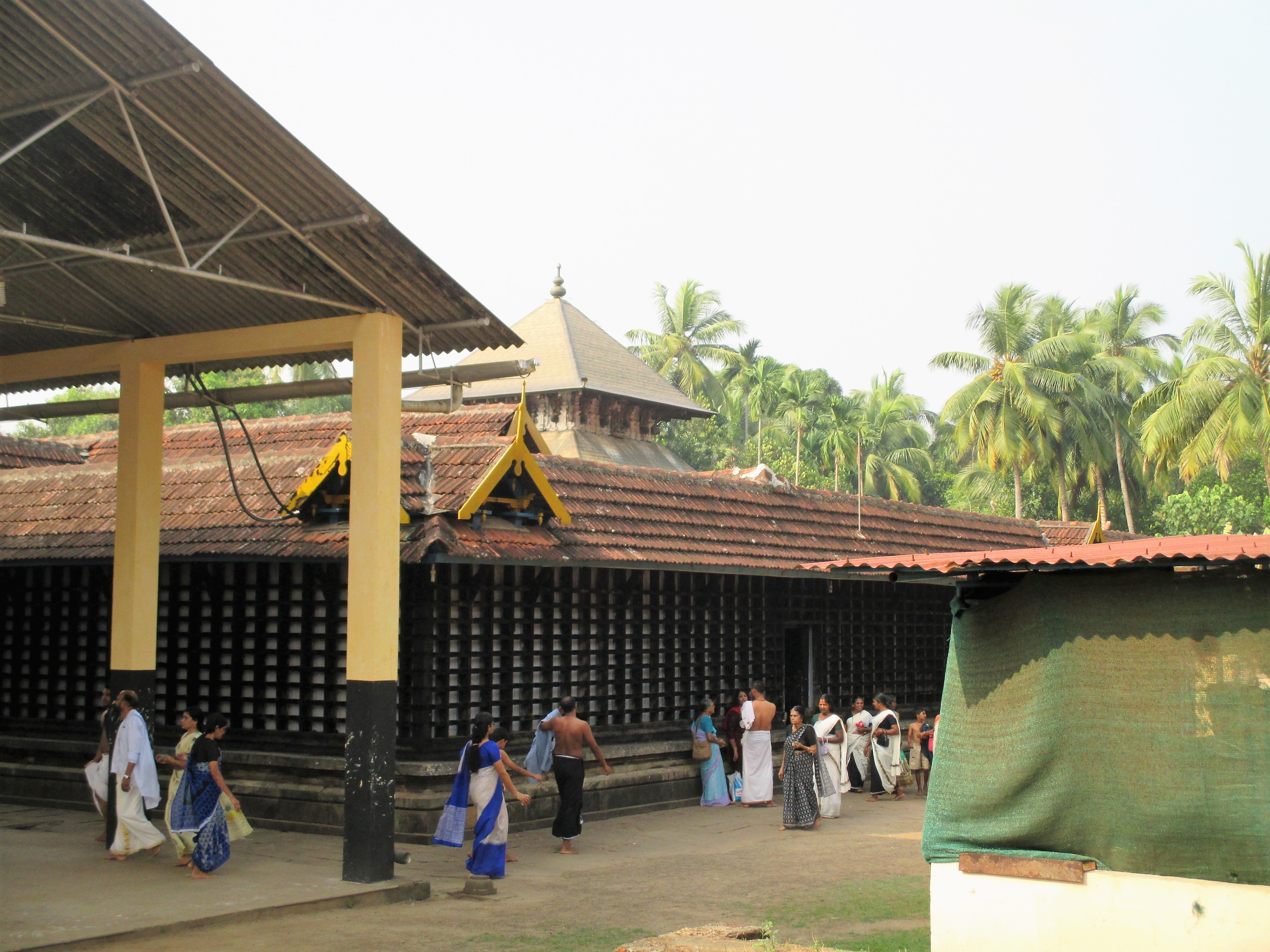
The outer walls around the sanctum of the temple

A rectangular wall around the temple, called kshetra-matilluka pierced by the gateways, encloses all the temples within the temple. The metal plated flag-post (dvaja sthambha) is located axial to the temple tower leading to the central sanctum and there is a dipasthambha, which is the light post. Chuttuambalam is the outer pavilion within the temple walls. The central temple and the associated hall is located in a rectangular structure called nalambalam, which has pillared halls and corridors.

Between the entrance of nalambalam to the sanctum, there is a raised square platform called namaskara mandapa which has a pyramidal roof. Thevrapura, the kitchen used to cook offering to the Navamukunda is located on the left of namaskara mandapa from the entrance. Balithara is an altar is used for making ritualistic offering to demi-gods and the festive deities. The central temple called sri kovil houses the idol of the Navamukunda. It is on an elevated platform with a single door reached through a flight of five steps. Either sides of the doors have images of guardian deities called dvarapalakas. As per Kerala rituals, only the main priest called tantri and the second priest called melsanti alone can enter the sri kovil.

The central temple has a square plan with the base built of granite, superstructure built of laterite and conical roof made of terracotta tile supported from inside by a wooden structure. The roof projects in two levels to protect the inner structure from heavy rains during monsoon. The roof of the temple and some of the pillars have lavish wood and stucco carvings depicting various stories of epics, Ramayana and Mahabharata. The outer walls around the sanctum have a series of wooden frames housing an array of lamps, which are lit during festive occasions.

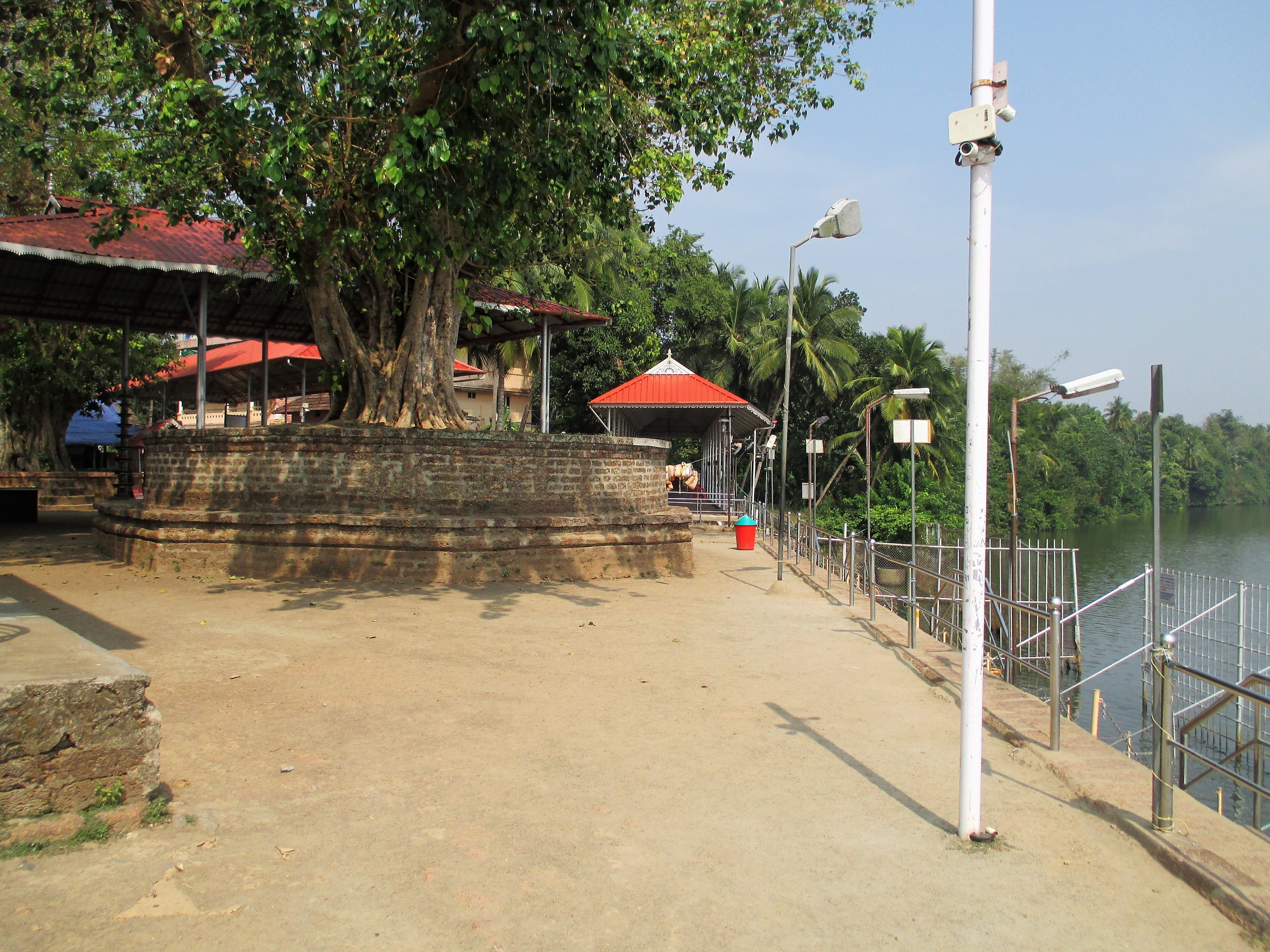
River bank where austerities are performed for forefathers

The idol of Navamukunda is portrayed only from above the knee, the rest of the idol being concealed within the ground. There is believed to be a bottomless unexplored pit behind the idol in the sanctum. The idol of the Navamukunda is 6 ft (1.8 m) tall, and is made of stone and covered with pancha loha. The idol is in a standing posture, with four hands carrying Panchajanya conch, lotus flower, Kaumodaki mace and the terrible Sudarshana discus. The idol is facing east.

Goddess Lakshmi has a separate sri kovil in the Tirunavaya Temple. The sri kovil is in the north-west of the nalambalam, to the left of Navamukunda, and the idol is facing east. The idol only have two hands, with varadabhaya mudra.

== Pitru Tharpanam or Thithi or Pinda pradhanam ==
This temple is famous for pitru tharpanam. Like most of the temples in Kerala, One has to pay charges at the ticket counter which is hardly less than 100 rupees, And dip in the river(clothes the male needs to wear is mundu or dhoti or veshti) and in the wet clothes offer the tharpanam. All the ritual pooja items will be provided by the temple. After the ritual is complete, the wet clothes have to be changed. The temple strictly does not allow pants or other non Indian wear. Strictly men have to be in dhoti and their shirts removed.

== Accommodation ==
Accommodation is provided by the temple administration. Affordable accommodation is provided here. Rooms and common dormitories are available. One can contact the temple administration for advance bookings.

== Festivals ==
- Mamankam festival celebrated in the temple was the most prominent festival in Kerala in the Middle Ages.
- Devotees perform prayers for their separated souls (pitrs) on the banks of the River "Bharathappuzha" in the temple.
- The major religious practices are Naivilakku, Thamara mala, Palpayasam, Malar para and Thali Charthal.
