= Tirunavaya =

Tirunavaya Thirunavaya
- Town; Revenue Village; Gram Panchayat
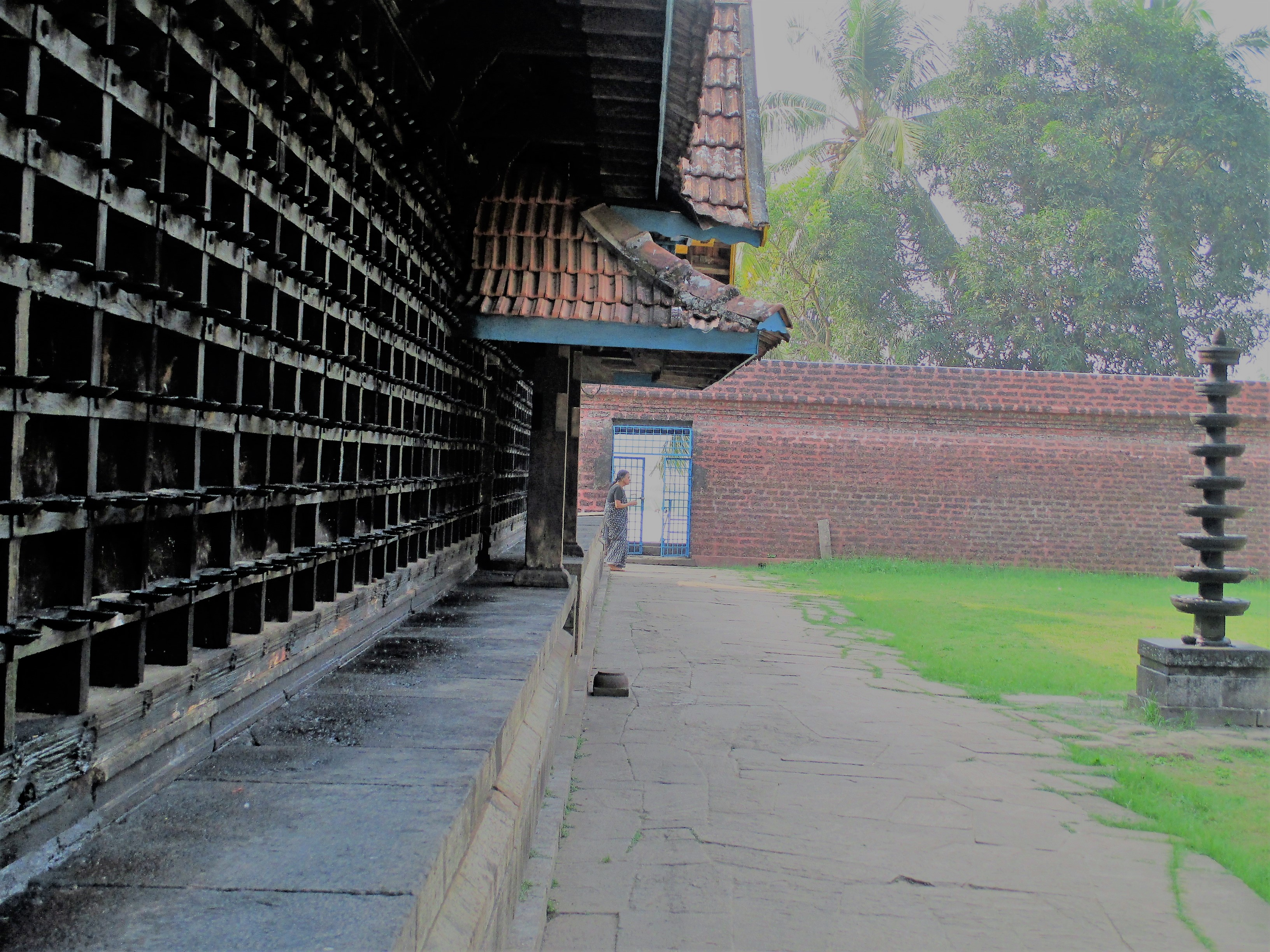
- Navamukunda Temple, Tirunavaya

- Location in Kerala, India
- Coordinates: 11.0010°N 75.9911°E
- Country: India
- State: Kerala
- District: Malappuram
- Vehicle registration: KL55
- Nearest Municipality: Tirur
- Website: village.kerala.gov.in

Tirunavaya, also spelled as Thirunavaya, is a town in Tirur Malappuram, Kerala. Situated on the northern bank of Bharatappuzha (River Ponnani/Nila or Perar), it is one of the major Hindu pilgrimage centres in Kerala. Tirunavaya, home to Tirunavaya Temple (Navamukunda/Vishnu Temple) and temples of Siva and Brahma (Cherutirunavaya Brahma Temple and Siva Temple/Tirunavaya Mahadeva Temple), is one of the most prominent places for bali tarpana on Karkitaka vavu in Kerala.

== History ==
Tirunavaya seems to be a very sacred place for the Hindus of Kerala from time immemorial. Bharathappuzha at Tirunavaya is considered to assume a special sanctity, because it flows between the temple of Vishnu (Navamukunda) on its right bank and the temple of Brahma and Siva on its left. The village, situated on the fertile river basin, must have been one of the most prominent Brahmin settlement in Kerala. Tirunavaya also hosted the Mamankam, a type of medieval temple festival with huge political significance, in every 12 years.

== Navamukunda Temple ==
The Navamukunda Temple is considered one of the 108 original tirupatis (divyadesa) of the Vaishnava alvars. The pitrkarma/pitrkriyas performed at Tirunavaya, a trimūrti sangama, are considered as very sacred. On Karkitaka vavu (amavasi), Hindus from different part of northern Kerala travel to the temple, to perform the Pitrkriya (bali tarpana) seeking moksha for their ancestors. According to media, more than 50,000 devotees performed vavu bali at Navamukunda Temple in 2015. Bali rites are also performed at Tirunavaya on the vavu days of Tulam and Kumbham.

== Geography & Demographics ==
Tirunavaya Census Town, geographical area: 11.01 km^{2} (4.25 sq mi), has a population of 24,790 (2011). The Muslims compose 77.41% of the total number, while Hindus form of 18.30% of the total population. Schedule Caste (SC) constitutes 6.17% while Schedule Tribe (ST) were 0.63% of total population in Tirunavaya CT.

=== Climate ===
Yearly average rainfall of the census town is 2,769 mm (109.0 in). Maximum temperature here reaches up to 32 °C (90 °F) and minimum temperature goes down to 25 °C (77 °F).

== Places of interest ==
- Navamukunda Temple
- Nilapadu Thara
- Marunnara
- Manikinar
- Changampally Kalari
- Lotus Lake Wetland Thirunavaya Malappuram Thirunavaya Lotus lake and Lotus farm is a popular tourist destination. it is famous for the lotus plants on the lake and the temples near the lake, the Thirunavaya Temple.

== Festivals ==
- Mamankam festival

Mamankam festival was held once every 12 years at Tirunavaya, Kerala on the banks of the river Bharathappuzha,

- Vairankode vela

== Transportation ==
- Nearest Airports: Calicut (CCJ) and Cochin International Airport
- Nearest Municipality: Tirur, valanchery
- Nearest Major Railway Station: Tirunnavaya railway station, Kuttippuram 7 km, Tirur 11 km
