= List of villages in Malappuram district =

Revenue villages of Malappuram
- Local Self Government Institutions in the district
- Category: Revenue villages
- Location: Malappuram district
- Number: 138 revenue villages
- Government: Government of Kerala
- Subdivisions: Taluks in Malappuram

This is a list of villages in Malappuram district, Kerala, India. Malappuram district is divided into 138 villages, which combine to form 7 Taluks, which again combine to form 2 revenue divisions.

Distribution of Population in Malappuram district (2011)

== Tirur Revenue Division ==
Tirur Revenue Division is one of the two revenue divisions that form the district. It consists of four Taluks namely Ponnani, Tirur, Tirurangadi, and Kondotty. Ponnani Taluk consists of 11 villages (Subdivision of Taluk), Tirur contains 30 villages, Tirurangadi contains 17, and Kondotty Taluk consists of 12 revenue villages.

=== Kondotty Taluk ===
- Cheekode
- Cherukavu
- Chelembra
- Kondotty
- Kuzhimanna
- Melangadi
- Morayur
- Muthuvallur
- Nediyiruppu
- Pallikkal
- Pulikkal
- Vazhakkad
- Vazhayur

=== Ponnani Taluk ===
- Alamcode
- Edappal
- Ezhuvathiruthy
- Kalady
- Kakkidippuram
- Maranchery
- Nannamukku
- Panthavoor
- Perumpadappa
- Ponnani Nagaram
- Thavanur
- Vattamkulam
- Veliyankode

=== Tirur Taluk ===
- Ananthavoor
- Athavanad
- Cheriyamundam
- Edayur
- Irimbiliyam
- Kalpakanchery
- Kattipparuthi
- Kottakkal
- Kozhichena
- Kurumbathur
- Kuttippuram
- Mangalam
- Marakkara
- Melmuri
- Naduvattom
- Niramaruthur
- Ozhur
- Pariyapuram
- Perumanna
- Ponmala
- Ponmundam
- Purathur
- Tanalur
- Tanur
- Thalakkad
- Tirunavaya
- Tirur
- Thrikkandiyur
- Triprangode
- Valavannur
- Vettom

=== Tirurangadi Taluk ===
- Abdu Rahiman Nagar
- Ariyallur
- Edarikode
- Kannamangalam
- Moonniyur
- Nannambra
- Neduva
- Oorakam
- Othukkungal
- Parappanangadi
- Parappur
- Peruvallur
- Puthupparamb
- Thenhipalam
- Thennala
- Tirurangadi
- Vallikunnu
- Vengara

== Perinthalmanna Revenue Division ==
Perinthalmanna Revenue Division is the other revenue division which is included in the district. It consists of three Taluks namely Nilambur, Eranad, and Perinthalmanna. Nilambur Taluk consists of 21 villages (Subdivision of Taluk), Eranad contains 23 villages, and Perinthalmanna Taluk consists of 24 revenue villages.

=== Eranad Taluk ===
- Anakkayam
- Areekode
- Chembrassery
- Edavanna
- Elankur
- Karakunnu
- Kavanoor
- Kizhuparamba
- Malappuram
- Manjeri
- Melmuri
- Narukara
- Panakkad
- Pandikkad
- Pandallur
- Payyanad
- Perakamanna
- Pookkottur
- Pulpatta
- Trikkalangode
- Urangattiri
- Vettikattiri
- Vettilappara

=== Nilambur Taluk ===
- Akampadam
- Amarambalam
- Cherucode
- Chokkad
- Chungathara
- Edakkara
- Kalikavu
- Karulai
- Karuvarakundu
- Kerala Estate
- Kurumbalangode
- Mampad
- Moothedam
- Nilambur
- Pullipadam
- Porur
- Pothukal
- Thiruvali
- Tuvvur
- Vazhikkadavu
- Vellayur
- Wandoor

=== Perinthalmanna Taluk ===
- Aliparamba
- Anamangad
- Angadipuram
- Arakkuparamba
- Edappatta
- Elamkulam
- Kariavattom
- Keezhattur
- Kodur
- Koottilangadi
- Kuruva
- Kuruvambalam
- Mankada
- Melattur
- Moorkkanad
- Nenmini
- Pathaikara
- Perinthalmanna
- Pulamantol
- Puzhakkattiri
- Thazhekode
- Vadakkangara
- Valambur
- Valapuram
- Vettathur

== See also ==
- List of Gram Panchayats in Malappuram district
- List of Desoms in Malappuram district (1981)
