= Administration of Malappuram district =

The Malappuram district has four types of administrative hierarchies:

- Taluk and Village administration managed by the Revenue Department of the government of Kerala
- Panchayath administration managed by the rural local bodies such as gram panchayats, block panchayats and district panchayat.
- Municipal administration managed by the urban local bodies such as Municipalities.
- Parliament Electoral Constituencies for the federal government of India
- Assembly Electoral Constituencies for the provincial government of Kerala

Malappuram district

== Civic administration ==
Map of Malappuram District

Distribution of Population in Local Bodies (2011)

Being the headquarters city, Malappuram comprises the Civil Station area which consists of administrative and other Government offices of the district such as District Collectorate, District Treasury, RTO, PWD Division Office, District Panchayat, Town planning Office, Text depot, District Medical office, etc. to name a few. The city is administered by the Malappuram Municipality, headed by a Municipal Chairman. For administrative purposes, the city is divided into 40 wards, from which the members of the municipal council are elected for five years. The Chairman of Malappuram Municipality is Sri mujeeb Kaderi (IUML) and the Deputy Chairperson is Sri. Konnola fousiya (INC). The present Malappuram District Collector is K. Gopalakrishnan.

=== ISO Certification ===
Malappuram is the first municipal body in India to win an ISO 9001-2008 certification for quality management. It has been on a track of fast reforms for the past couple of years and has achieved the distinction of having zero pendency of files.

=== Law and order ===
City police is headed by a DySP (Deputy Superintendent of police) of Malappuram. And Office of Superintendent of Police is also at Malappuram. Apart from regular law and order, city police comprise the Malappuram Traffic Police, Bomb Squad, Dog Squad, Women's Cell, Narcotics Cell, Malabar Special Police, Armed Police Camp, District Crime Records Bureau.

=== Proposed Malappuram Municipal Corporation ===
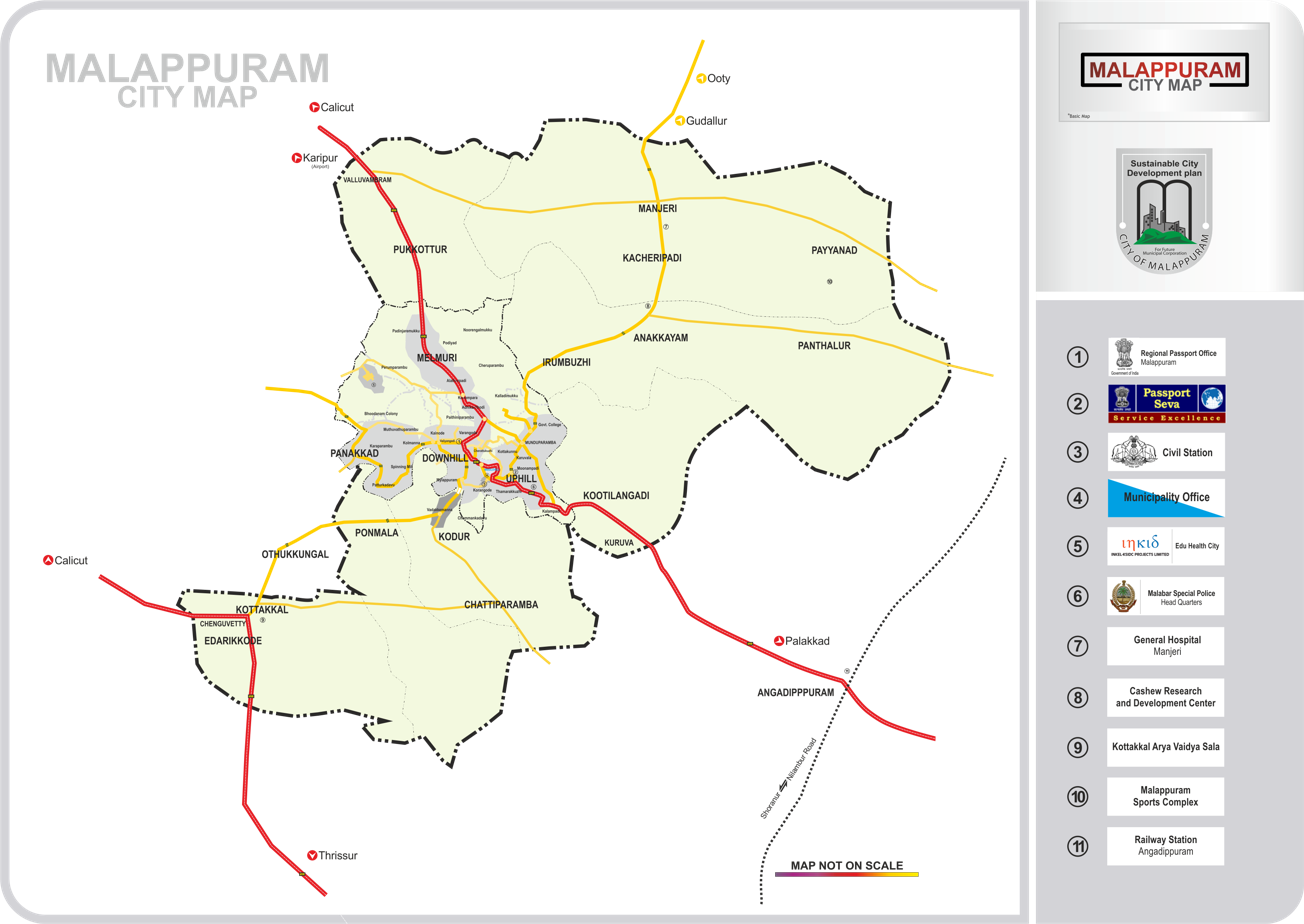
Malappuram City Map showing proposed corporation limit

There is a demand to upgrade Malappuram Municipality to a Municipal Corporation by incorporating the local bodies in the Greater Malappuram region. The proposed Malappuram Municipal Corporation comprises:

- Malappuram Municipality
- Manjeri Municipality
- Kottakkal Municipality
- Anakkayam Outgrowth.
- Trikkalangode, a suburb village of Manjeri
- Koottilangadi, a suburb village of Malappuram
- Pookkottur, a suburb village of Malappuram
- Kodur, a suburb village of Malappuram
- Ponmala, a suburb village of Malappuram
- Othukkungal, an outgrowth of Malappuram
- Makkaraparamba

== Political Divisions ==
The federal, provincial and local administration of Malappuram district has a complex structure.

Political divisions include 3 Lok Sabha constituencies for the Lok Sabha (lower house of the Indian Parliament) and 16 legislative assembly constituencies for the Kerala Legislative Assembly in the district. Each represented by a Member of Parliament (MP) and Member of Legislative Assembly (MLA) respectively.

=== Parliament constituencies (Lok Sabha) ===
- Malappuram Lok Sabha constituency
- Ponnani Lok Sabha constituency (Consists minor portion of Palakkad district; Thrithala)
- Wayanad Lok Sabha constituency (Minor portion: Eranad, Nilambur, Wandoor LACs)

=== Legislative Assembly constituencies ===
A clickable map of the 16 Legislative Assembly constituencies in the district

Sl.no	Constituency	Reserved for (SC/ST/None)	Local segments	Member of the 15th Niyamasabha	Party	Alliance
33	Kondotty	None	List: Municipality Kondotty; Grama panchayats Cheekode Cherukavu Pulikkal Vazhakkad Vazhayur	T. V. Ibrahim	IUML	UDF
34	Eranad	None	List: Grama panchayats Areekode Chaliyar Edavanna Kavanoor Keezhuparamba Kuzhimanna Urangattiri	P. K. Basheer	IUML	UDF
35	Nilambur	None	List: Municipality Nilambur; Grama panchayats Amarambalam Chungathara Edakkara Karulayi Moothedam Pothukallu Vazhikkadavu	Aryadan Shoukath	Independent	UDF
36	Wandoor	SC	List: Grama panchayats Chokkad Kalikavu Karuvarakundu Mampad Porur Thiruvali Thuvvur Wandoor	A. P. Anil Kumar	INC	UDF
37	Manjeri	None	List: Municipality Manjeri; Grama panchayats Trikkalangode Pandikkad Keezhattur Edappatta	U. A. Latheef	IUML	UDF
38	Perinthalmanna	None	List: Municipality Perinthalmanna; Grama Panchayats Melattur Vettathur Thazhekode Aliparamba Pulamanthole Elamkulam	Najeeb Kanthapuram	IUML	UDF
39	Mankada	None	List: Grama Panchayaths Koottilangadi Mankada Makkaraparamba Kuruva Puzhakkattiri Angadippuram Moorkanad	Manjalamkuzhi Ali	IUML	UDF
40	Malappuram	None	List: Municipality Malappuram; Grama panchayats Pulpatta Pookkottur Anakkayam Morayur Kodur	P. Ubaidulla	IUML	UDF
41	Vengara	None	List: Grama Panchayaths Abdu Rahiman Nagar Kannamangalam Oorakam Vengara Parappur Othukkungal	P. K. Kunhalikutty	IUML	UDF
42	Vallikunnu	None	List: Grama Panchayaths Chelembra Pallikkal Peruvallur Thenhipalam Vallikunnu Moonniyur	P. Abdul Hameed	IUML	UDF
43	Tirurangadi	None	List: Municipalities Tirurangadi Parappanangadi; Grama panchayats Nannambra Thennala Edarikode Perumanna Clari	K. P. A. Majeed	IUML	UDF
44	Tanur	None	List: Municipality Tanur; Grama panchayats Ozhur Ponmundam Thanalur Niramaruthur Cheriyamundam	V. Abdurahiman	INL	LDF
45	Tirur	None	List: Municipality Tirur; Grama Panchayats Valavannur Kalpakancheri Vettom Thalakkad Thirunavaya Athavanad	Kurukkoli Moideen	IUML	UDF
46	Kottakkal	None	List: Municipalities Kottakkal Valanchery; Grama panchayats Ponmala Marakkara Edayur Irimbiliyam Kuttippuram	K. K. Abid Hussain Thangal	IUML	UDF
47	Thavanur	None	List: Grama Panchayaths Thavanur Kalady Vattamkulam Edappal Mangalam Thriprangode Purathur	K. T. Jaleel	Independent	LDF
48	Ponnani	None	List: Municipality Ponnani; Grama Panchayats Marancheri Alamcode Nannamukku Perumbadappa Veliyankode	P. Nandakumar	CPI(M)	LDF

=== Parliament constituencies ===
Parliamentary constituency	Assembly constituencies	MP	Political party
Malappuram	Malappuram, Manjeri, Mankada, Perinthalmanna, Vallikunnu, Kondotty and Vengara.	MP Abdussamad Samadani	IUML
Ponnani (Major portion)	Tirurangadi, Tirur, Tanur, Ponnani, Kottakkal and Thavanur.	ET Mohammed Basheer	IUML
Wayanad (Minor portion)	Eranad, Wandoor and Nilambur.	Priyanka Gandhi	INC

== Administrative sub-divisions ==
The district consists of two revenue divisions (Tirur and Perintalmanna), seven subdistricts, 135 villages, 15 blocks, twelve municipalities and 100 panchayats.

=== Revenue administration ===
The Collectrate, headed by the District Collector, coordinates and administers revenue administration, headquartered in Malappuram. For the ease of revenue administration, there are 7 subdistricts in the district, which are again divided into 138 revenue villages. These 7 subdistricts are combined in 2 revenue divisions namely Tirur and Perinthalmanna. Revenue divisional offices (RDOs) are situated in Tirur and Perinthalmanna, respectively, and are headed by Revenue Divisional Officers (RDOs)/Sub-Collectors.

Subdistrict	Area (in km^{2})	Population (2011)	Villages
Ponnani	200	379,798	11
Tirur	448	928,672	30
Tirurangadi	290*	631,906*	17
Kondotty	254*	410,577*	12
Eranad	491*	581,512*	23
Perinthalmanna	506	606,396	24
Nilambur	1,343	574,059	21
Sources: 2011 Census of India, Official website of Malappuram district

Ponnani, Tirur, Tirurangadi, and Kondotty are included in the Tirur revenue division, whereas the remaining Taluks together form Perinthalmanna revenue division.

- List of revenue villages in Malappuram district
- List of desoms in Malappuram district

=== Rural administration ===
An election map showing the results of 2020 Kerala local elections in Malappuram district

For the ease of rural administration, the rural district is divided into 94 Gram Panchayats which together form 15 blocks. These 15 block panchayats combine to form the Malappuram district Panchayat, which is the apex body of rural governance in the district. The 94 Gram Panchayats are again divided into 1,778 wards. However, Census towns (small towns with urban features) also come under the jurisdiction of Gram Panchayats.

- List of gram panchayats in Malappuram district

=== Urban administration ===
For the ease of urban administration, 12 municipalities are there in the district.

List of municipal towns/cities in Malappuram district
No.	Municipal town	Taluk	Images	No.	Municipal town	Taluk	Images
1	Ponnani	Ponnani	Ponnani	7	Tirurangadi	Tirurangadi	Tirurangadi
2	Manjeri	Eranad	Manjeri	8	Tirur	Tirur	Tirur
3	Parappanangadi	Tirurangadi	Parappanangadi	9	Perinthalmanna	Perinthalmanna	Perinthalmanna
4	Tanur	Tirur	Tanur	10	Nilambur	Nilambur	Nilambur
5	Malappuram	Eranad	Malappuram	11	Valanchery	Tirur	Valanchery
6	Kondotty	Kondotty	Kondotty	12	Kottakkal	Tirur	Kottakkal

	Municipality	Wards	Population (2011)	Chairperson	Political Party	Pre-poll Alliance
1	Manjeri	50	97,102	V. M. Subaida	IUML	UDF
2	Ponnani	51	90,491	Sivadasan Attupurath	CPI(M)	LDF
3	Parappanangadi	45	71,239	A. Usman	IUML	UDF
4	Tanur	44	69,534	P. P. Shamsudheen	IUML	UDF
5	Malappuram	40	68,088	Mujeeb Kaderi	IUML	UDF
6	Kondotty	40	59,256	Fathimath Suhrabi. C. T	IUML	UDF
7	Tirurangadi	39	56,632	K. P. Muhammad Kutty	IUML	UDF
8	Tirur	38	56,058	Naseema	IUML	UDF
9	Perinthalmanna	34	49,723	P. Shaji	CPI(M)	LDF
10	Kottakkal	32	48,342	Bushra Shabeer	IUML	UDF
11	Nilambur	33	46,342	Mattummal Saleem	CPI(M)	LDF
12	Valanchery	33	44,437	Ashraf Ambalathingal	IUML	UDF

== See also ==
- Education in Malappuram
- History of Malappuram
- List of desoms in Malappuram (1981)
- List of Gram Panchayats in Malappuram
- List of people from Malappuram
- List of villages in Malappuram
- Transportation in Malappuram
- Malappuram metropolitan area
- Malappuram district
- South Malabar
