= List of desoms in Malappuram district (1981) =

Desoms of Malappuram (1981)
- Category: Desoms
- Location: Malappuram district
- Government: Government of Kerala
- Subdivisions: Revenue villages in Malappuram

At the time of the 1981 Census of India, the Malappuram district was divided into 4 Taluks namely, Eranad, Perinthalmanna, Tirur, and Ponnani. The Taluks were further classified into several Revenue Villages which were again a combination of some Desoms. This is a list of Desoms and their curresponding Revenue Villages of Malappuram district in the year 1981.

Desoms included in the Municipal towns of Malappuram District in 1981 are not included in this list. In 1981, Malappuram District had four Municipal Towns, Malappuram and Manjeri in Eranad Taluk, Tirur in Tirur Taluk, and Ponnani in Ponnani taluk.

== Background ==
Desoms were the basic unit of Revenue Divisions in the Malabar District during British Raj. Desoms were usually named on the basis of smaller towns or forest area in that region. One or more Desoms combine to form Amsoms. Several Amsoms combine to form Revenue blocks. One or more Revenue blocks combine to form Taluks. These Taluks combine to form Revenue Divisions. It was the hierarchy of Revenue Administration in the erstwhile Malabar District. Following the formation of the state of Kerala in 1956, the Amsoms were replaced by Revenue Villages.

== Eranad Taluk ==
Desoms of Eranad Taluk (1981)
Sl.No	Revenue Village (1981)	Desoms included (1981)
1	Vazhayur	Azhinjilam, Karad, Kakkov, Vazhayur, Peringav, Puthukode
2	Vazhakkad	Karumarakode, Anthayur, Vazhakkad, Cheruvayur, Mappuram, Chaliappuram
3	Cheekkode	Omanoor, Cheekkode, Vavoor
4	Kizhuparamba	Kizhuparamba, Trikkalayur, Kuniyil, Pathanapuram
5	Urangattiri	Areekode, Urangattiri, Edavanna Range
6	Mampad	Mampad
7	Nilambur	Nilambur, Edavanna Range
8	Chungathara	Chungathara, Chungathara Range I, Chungathara Range II
9	Edakkara	Edakkara, Chungathara Range II
10	Amarambalam	Amarambalam, Trikkunnassery, Karulai Range, Kalikavu and Perinthalmanna Range
11	Wandoor	Kappil, Wandoor, Pazhadom, Vaniyambalam, Mudappilassery
12	Thiruvali	Thiruvali, Chadangamkulam, Punnappala
13	Edavanna	Pathapiriyam, Edavanna, Eranhikode
14	Perakamanna	Chathallur, Perakamanna, Vadissery
15	Kavanoor	Kavanur, Vakkalur, Erivetty, Elayur, Chengara
16	Areekode	Ugrapuram, Areekode, Puthalam, Kozhakkuthur, Chemrakkattur, Mundambra, Velleri
17	Muthuvallur	Mundakkal, Parappur, Vilayil, Thavanoor, Parathakkad, Mundakkulam, Muthuvallur
18	Pulikkal	Anthiyoorkunnu, Arur, Olavattur, Nunjallur, Valiyaparamba, Muttayar, Vellara, Muzhangallur
19	Cherukavu	Pengad, Cherukavu, Paravur, Puthupadom, Vennayur, Chevayur
20	Chelembra	Chelembra
21	Pallikkal	Pallikkal, Puthur, Karipur, Chirayil
22	Kondotty	Kolathur, Neerad
23	Nediyiruppu	Nediyiruppu, Chirayil
24	Kuzhimanna	Kizhissery, Kuzhimanna, Kadungallur, Puliyakkode
25	Pulpatta	Muthannur, Pookkalathur, Pulpatta, Thottekkad, Valamangalam, Olamathil, Cheruputhur, Thrippanachi, Palakkad
26	Trikkalangode	Trikkalangode, Karikkad
27	Karakunnu	Amayur, Karakunnu
28	Elankur	Elankur
29	Porur	Palakkode, Eramangalam, Puthrakove, Porur, Ayinikkode, Edappalam, Chathangottupuram, Veethanassery
30	Vellayoor	Poongode, Pariyangad, Vellayoor
31	Kalikavu	Thrikkunnassery
32	Karuvarakundu	Cheramba, Karuvarakundu and Perinthalmanna section (1339)
33	Tuvvur	Tuvvur
34	Chembrassery	Kodassery, Thalpiriparamb, Theyyampadikuth, Kalambara, Ambalakalli, Odombatta, Vilangampoyil, Chembrsseri east, Thodiyappulam
35	Pandikkad	Pandikkad, Perukkad, Pukooth, Poolamanna
36	Vettikkattiri	Vettikkattiri, Karaya, Valluvangad, Valarad
37	Panthallur	Panthallur
38	Anakkayam	Pappinippura, Irumbuzhi, Vengaloor, Perimbalam, Anakkayam
39	Pookkottur	Velluvambram, Pullanur, Muthiriparamba, Pookkottur, Aravankara, Vellue
40	Morayur	Ozhukkur, Morayur, Mongam, Arimbra
41	Oorakam	Oorakam-Kizhmuri, Oorakam-Melmuri, Kottumala
42	Ponmala	Ponmala, Chappanangadi, Kooriyad, Thalakappa, Mannazhi, Chengottur, Kolkalam, Chunnoor
43	Kottakkal	Kottakkal, Kuttippuram, Villur, Indianur, Kottur

== Perinthalmanna Taluk ==
Desoms of Perinthalmanna Taluk (1981)
Sl.No	Revenue Village (1981)	Desoms included (1981)
1	Kodur	Mangattupulam, Kodur, Vadakkamanna, Chemmankadavu, Ummathur, Periyamanna, Peringottupulam, Pazhamallur
2	Kuruva	Kuruva, Ayanikkad, Karichapady, Vattalur, Pang
3	Koottilangadi	Vallikkappatta, Mankada-Pallippuram, Padinhattummuri, Kadukoor, Konothumuri, Kozhinhil, Perinthattiri, Kadungoth
4	Vadakkangara	Vellila, Vadakkangara, Kachinikkad, Makkaraparamba, Punnapra
5	Mankada	Kadannamanna, Karkitakam, Cheriyam, Kottil, Mankada
6	Nenmini	Thachinganadam, Chemmanthatta, Kondiparamba, Nallur, Nenmini
7	Keezhattur	Poonthavanam, Keezhattur, Vazhengode, Parambur, Mulliakurissi, Pattikkad
8	Melattur	Edayattur, Manazhi, Melattur, Chemmaniyode, Vengur
9	Edappatta	Edappatta, Pathirikode, Velliyancheri
10	Vettathur	Vettathur
11	Kariavattom	Pallikuth, Mannarmala, Kariavattom, Pacheeri, Thalakkad
12	Valambur	Aripra, Thirurkad, Eranthode, Valambur, Chathanalloor
13	Puzhakkattiri	Ramapuram, Panangangara, Pathirimanna, Puzhakkattiri, Kattilasseri, Kadungapuram, Kottuvada, Mannumukulam
14	Angadipuram	Cherakkaparamba, Angadipuram, Puthanangadi, Pariyapuram
15	Perinthalmanna	Cheerattamanna, Manathumangalam, Perinthalmanna, Kakkooth, Ponniakurissi
16	Pathaikkara	Kunnappally, Pathaikkara, Eravimangalam, Cherukara
17	Thazekode	Amminikkad, Thazhekode
18	Arakkuparamba	Arakkuparamba, Puthur
19	Aliparamba	Paral, Vazhenkada, Aliparamba
20	Anamangad	Chethanakurissi, Valamkulam, Odamala, Pariyaporam, Edathara, Anamangad, Punnakkode, Muzhannamanna, Manalaya
21	Elamkulam	Kizhungathole, Avinhikkad, Elamkulam, Kunnakkavu, Palathole, Koozhanthara, Muthukurissi, Elad
22	Pulamantol	Chemmalasseri, Chelakkad, Paloor, Pulamanthole, Thirunarayanapuram
23	Kuruvambalam	Malaparamba, Kuruvambalam
24	Moorkkanad	Kolathur, Vengad, Moorkkanad

== Tirur Taluk ==
Desoms of Tirur Taluk (1981)
Sl.No	Revenue Village (1981)	Desoms included (1981)
1	Vallikkunnu	Vallikkunnu
2	Tenhipalam	Thenhipalam
3	Peruvallur	Puthur, Keeranallur, Peruvallur, Olakara, Koypa, Koomanna, Enavoor
4	Kannamangalam	Kannamangalam, Cherur, Kilinakode
5	Abdu Rahman Nagar	Pukayur, Koduvayur, Mamburam
6	Moonniyur	Velimukku, Moonniyur
7	Ariyallur	Ariyallur, Kodakkad
8	Parappanangadi	Parappanangadi, Neduva, Ullanam
9	Tirurangadi	Thrikkulam, Tirurangadi, Kakkad, Kelamkurissi, Venniyoor
10	Vengara	Kuttoor, Vengara, Karuka, Valiyora
11	Parappur	Parappur-Iringallur Group Desam, Iringallur, Parappur
12	Othukkungal	Kaipatta, Mattathur, Cherukunnu, Puthur
13	Thennala	Venniyur, Thennala, Appala, Valakulam, Klari, Cherussola
14	Nannambra	Thiruthi, Kodinhi, Kaduvalur, Cherumukku, Kundoor, Nannambra
15	Tanur	Pariyapuram, Eranallur, Moriya, Panangattoor, Rayirimangalam, Tanur Nagaram
16	Ozhur	Eranallur, Kuruvattisseri, Korad, Manalipuzha, Karingappara, Perincheri, Omachapuzha, Ayyaya, Thalakkattur, Ozhur
17	Tanalur	Keraladheeswarapuram, Niramaruthur, Meenadathur, Tanalur, Pakara, Arikkad, Cheruvattur
18	Ponmundam	Chelavil, Athrisseri, Ponmundam
19	Perumanna	Perumanna, Klari, Kuruka, Puthur
20	Kalpakanchery	Thozhannur, Kalpakanchery, Ayirani, Paravannur
21	Marakkara	Keezhmuri, Erkkara, Moorkkanad, Kallaramangalam, Marakkara
22	Melmuri	Melmuri, Karayakkad(Karekkad)
23	Edayur	Vadakkumupuram, Edayur, Athippatta, Puvathumthara, Mavandiyur
24	Irimbiliyam	Puramannur, Kodumudi, Valiyakunnu, Vendallur, Irimbiliyam
25	Kattipparuthy	Thozhuvannur, Karthala, Kattipparuthy, Valanchery, Vaikathur, Kulamangalam
26	Kuttippuram	Kuttippuram, Kolakkad, Painkannur, Perassannur
27	Naduvattom	Nadavattom, Kutathole, Pazhur, Pakaranallur, Challur
28	Athavanad	Athavanad
29	Kurumbathur	Punnathala, Chelur, Koodassery, Edasseri, Kurumbathur
30	Ananthavoor	Ananthavoor, Kazhuthakkara, Koonallur, Valiyaparappur
31	Valavannur	Valavannur, Cheruvannur, Kadungallur, Panthavoor, Nellaparamba, Varanakkara, Pothannur, Kanmanam, Thekkummuri
32	Cheriyamundam	Thalakadathur, Cheriyamundam, Iringavoor, Vaniyannur, Kanthalur, Erumpulav
33	Vettom	Paravanna, Pachattiri, Kanoor, Pariyapuram, Vevanna, Padiyam, Vettom
34	Thalakkad	Mangattiri, Thevalapuram, Pullur, Aravanchery, Kanhirakole, Kuttur, Thekkankuttur, Vengallur, Thalakkad, Parassery
35	Thirunavaya	Karathoor, Pallar, Edakkulam, Thiruthi, Thirunavaya
36	Thriprangode	Vellamassery, Thandillakkara, Kuttamukku, Kaimalassery, Alathiyoor, Paverikkara, Poyilissery, Kainikkara, Thriprangode, Perinthallur, Cheriyaparappur, Vettom Pallippuram
37	Mangalam	Koottai, Thallookara, Pullooni, Punnamana, Mangalam, Chennara, Perunthiruthy, Cherupunna, Valamaruthur, Kavanchery
38	Purathur	Purathur, Muttannur, Maravantha, Edakkanad, Thrithallur, Kalavoor, Puthuppally

== Ponnani Taluk ==
Desoms of Ponnani Taluk (1981)
Sl.No	Revenue Village (1981)	Desoms included (1981)
1	Ezhuvathiruthy (Portion)	Ezhuvathiruthy, Kottathara, Eswaramangalam, Neithallur, Cheruvayikkara, Puzhampram, Erikkamanna, Theyyangad, Karukathiruthy, Kadavanad
2	Kalady	Nariparamba, Thandilam, Kadancheri, Kalady, Kizhmuri, Verur, Thiruthikundayar, Mangattur, Pothannur
3	Thavanur	Thavanur, Moovankara, Kadakasseri, Vellancheri, Mathirasseri, Koorada, Thrikkanapuram, Maravancheri, Kallur, Aynkalam, Trippalur, Athalur, Mathur
4	Vattamkulam	Melmuri, Chekanur, Pottur, Cheralasseri, Nellekkad, Kanthalloor, Kavapra, Muthur, Erumapra, Udinikkara, Thevalassery, Thaikkad, Kuttipala, Vattamkulam, Puramundekkad, Sukapuram, Naduvattom, Kaladithara, Nellisseri
5	Edappal	Polpakkara, Perumparamba, Porukkara, Ponnazhikkara, Edappal, Thuyyam, Thalamunda, Venginikkara, Ayilakkad, Pookkarathara, Kololamba
6	Maranchery	Kanhiramukku, Karakkad, Porang, Panampad, Maranchery, Parichakam
7	Veliyankode	Veliyankode, Pazhanji, Gramam, Perumudisseri, Eramangalam
8	Perumpadappu	Puthiyiruthi, Ayirur, Kodathur, Cherayi, Perumpadappu, Cheruvallur
9	Nannamukku	Vadakkummuri, Kanjoor, Pallikkara, Nannamukku, Kallurma, Pidavannur, Thekkummuri
10	Alamkode	Panthavur, Nellasserithara, Kakkidippuram, Alamkode, Perumukku, Chiyyanur, Kokkur, Othalur, Kizhukkara

== See also ==
- List of villages in Malappuram district
- List of Gram Panchayats in Malappuram district
