= Malappuram metropolitan area =

- Metropolitan Area
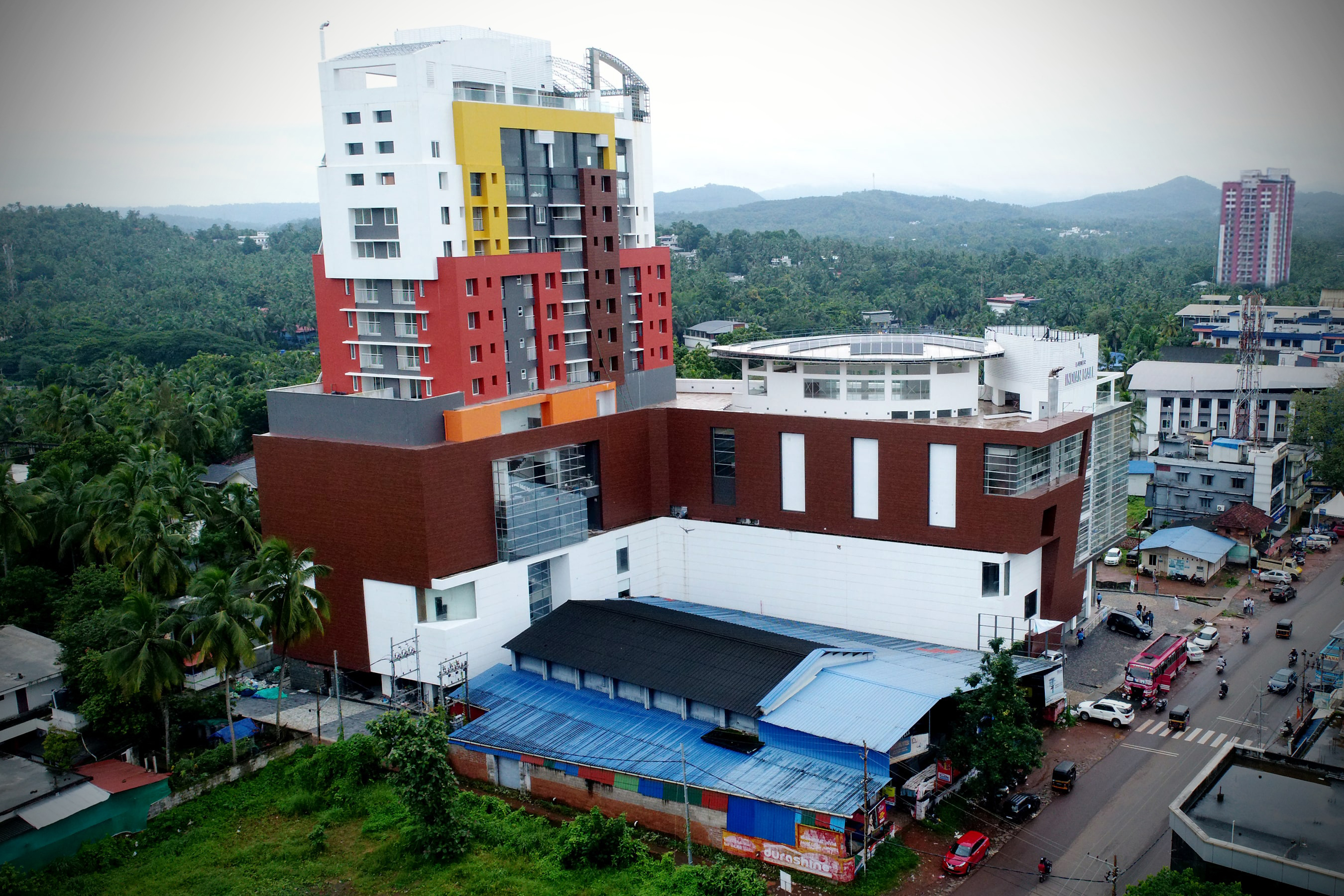
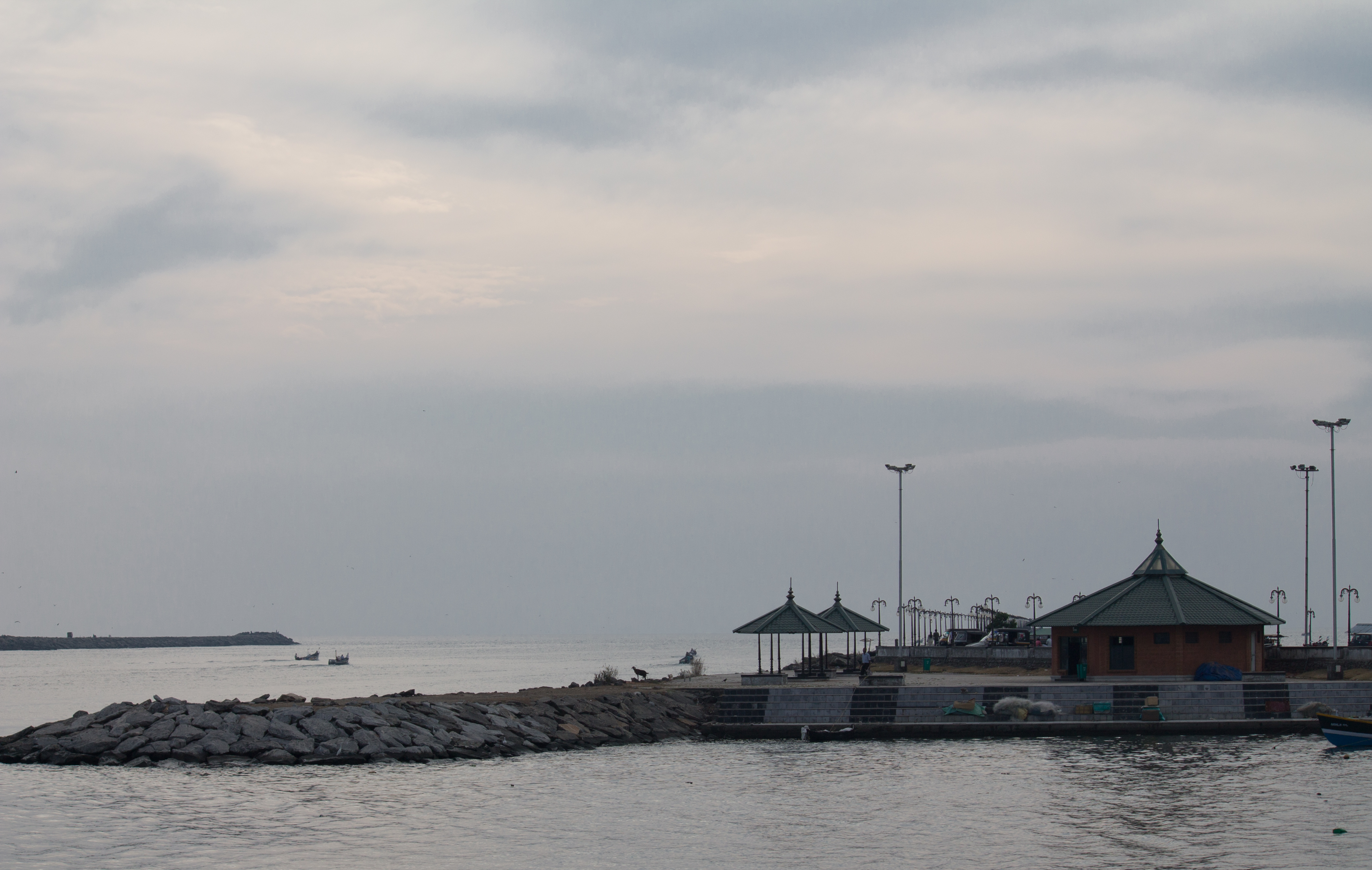
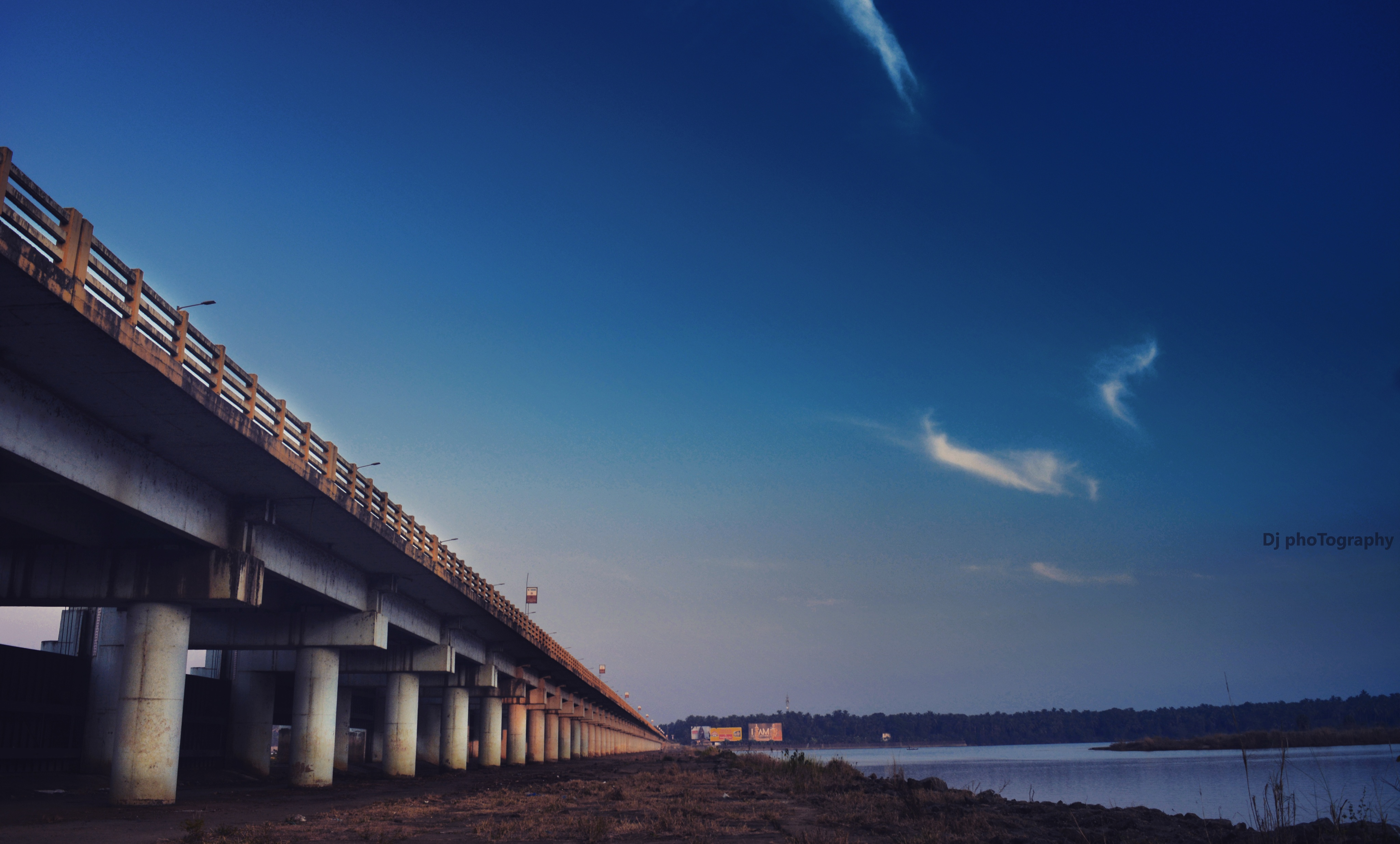
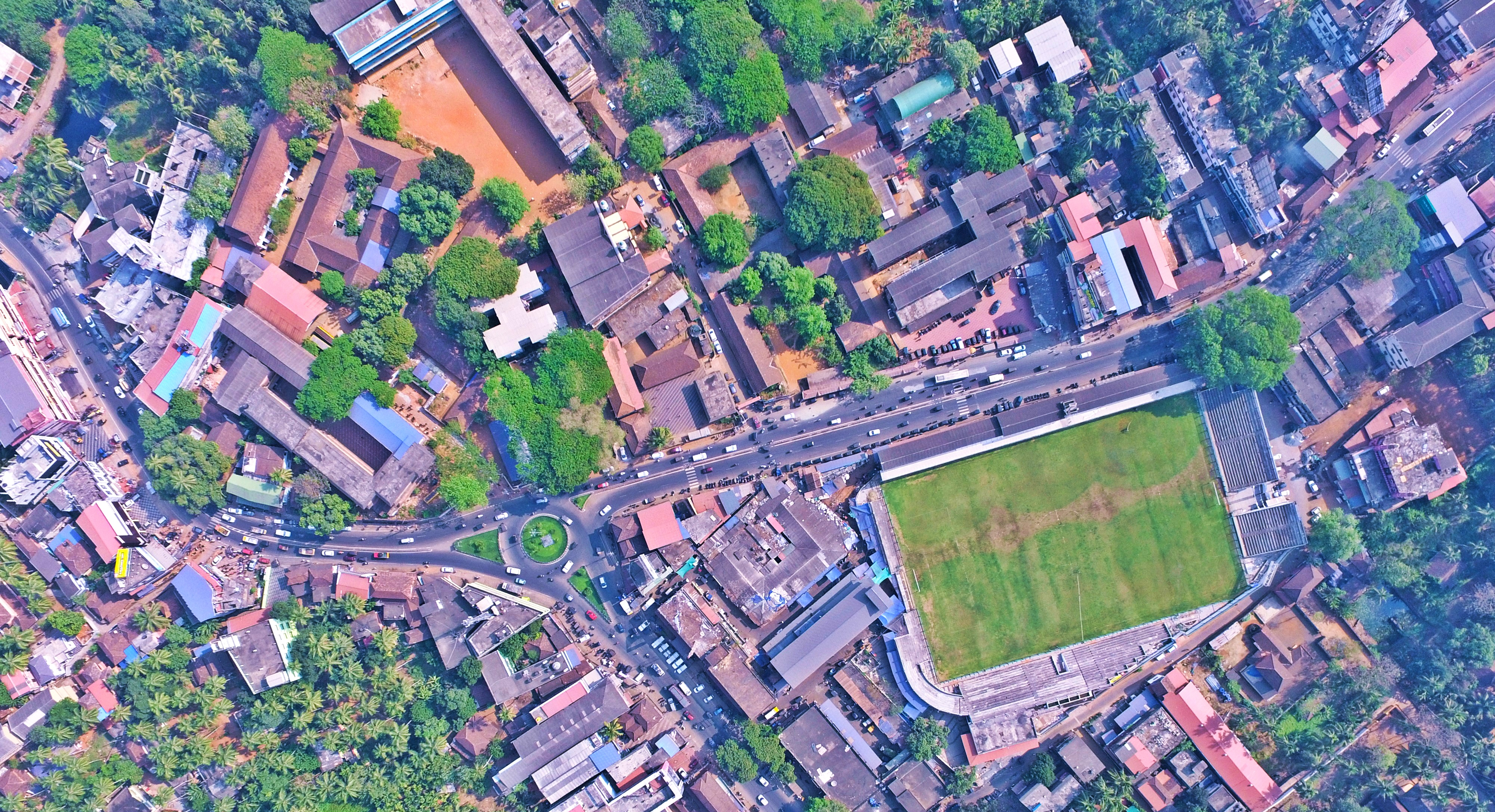
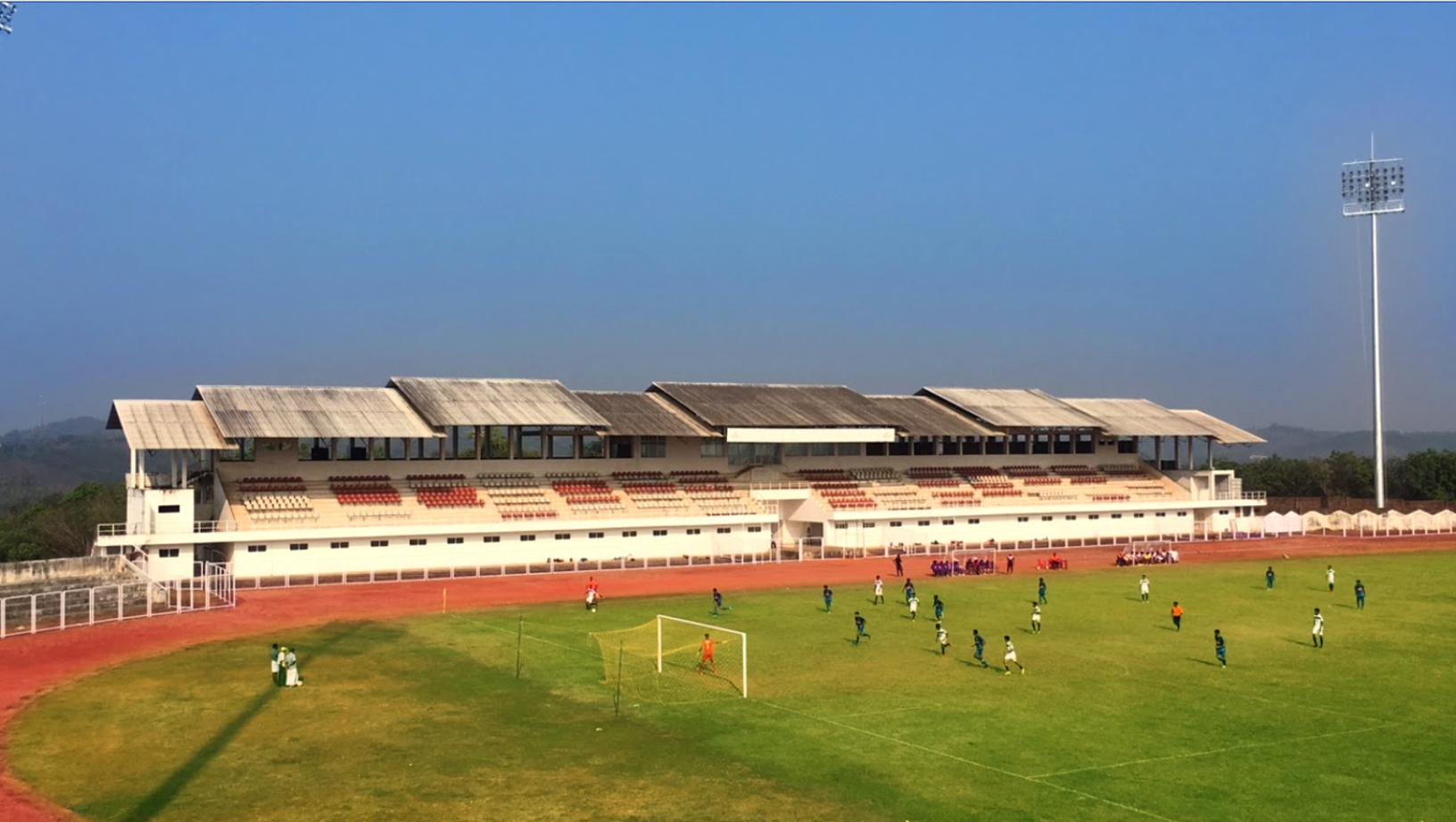
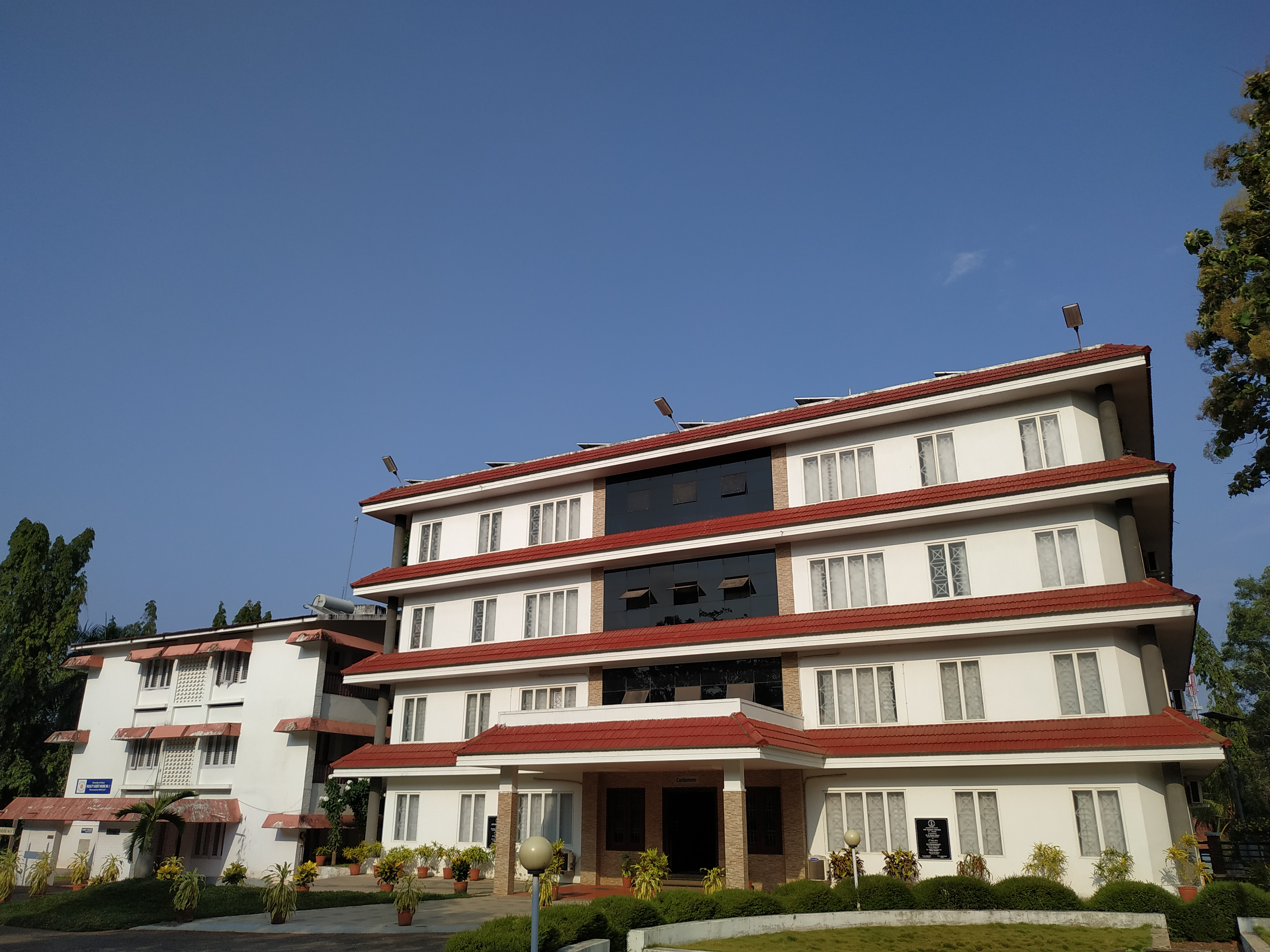
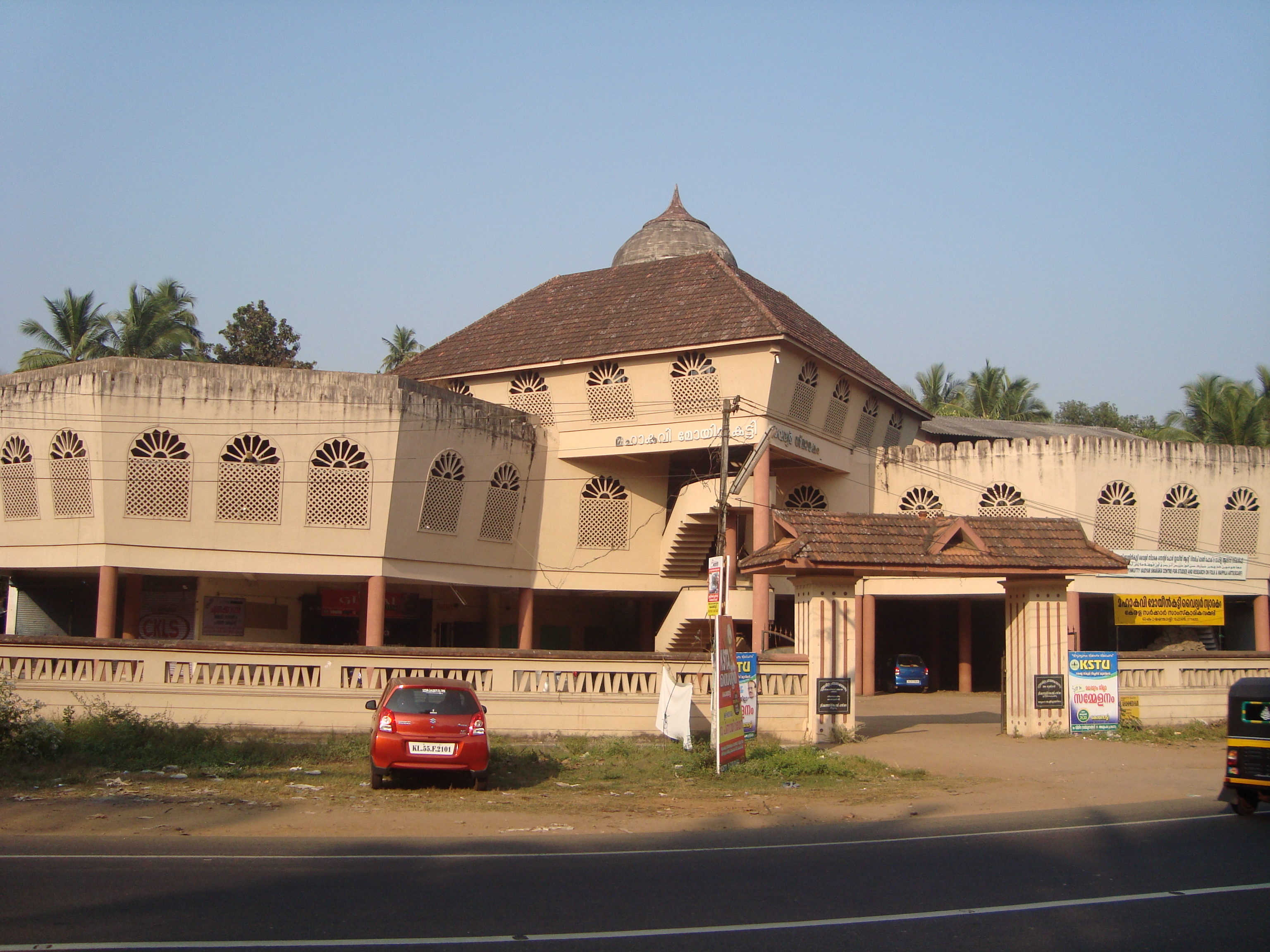
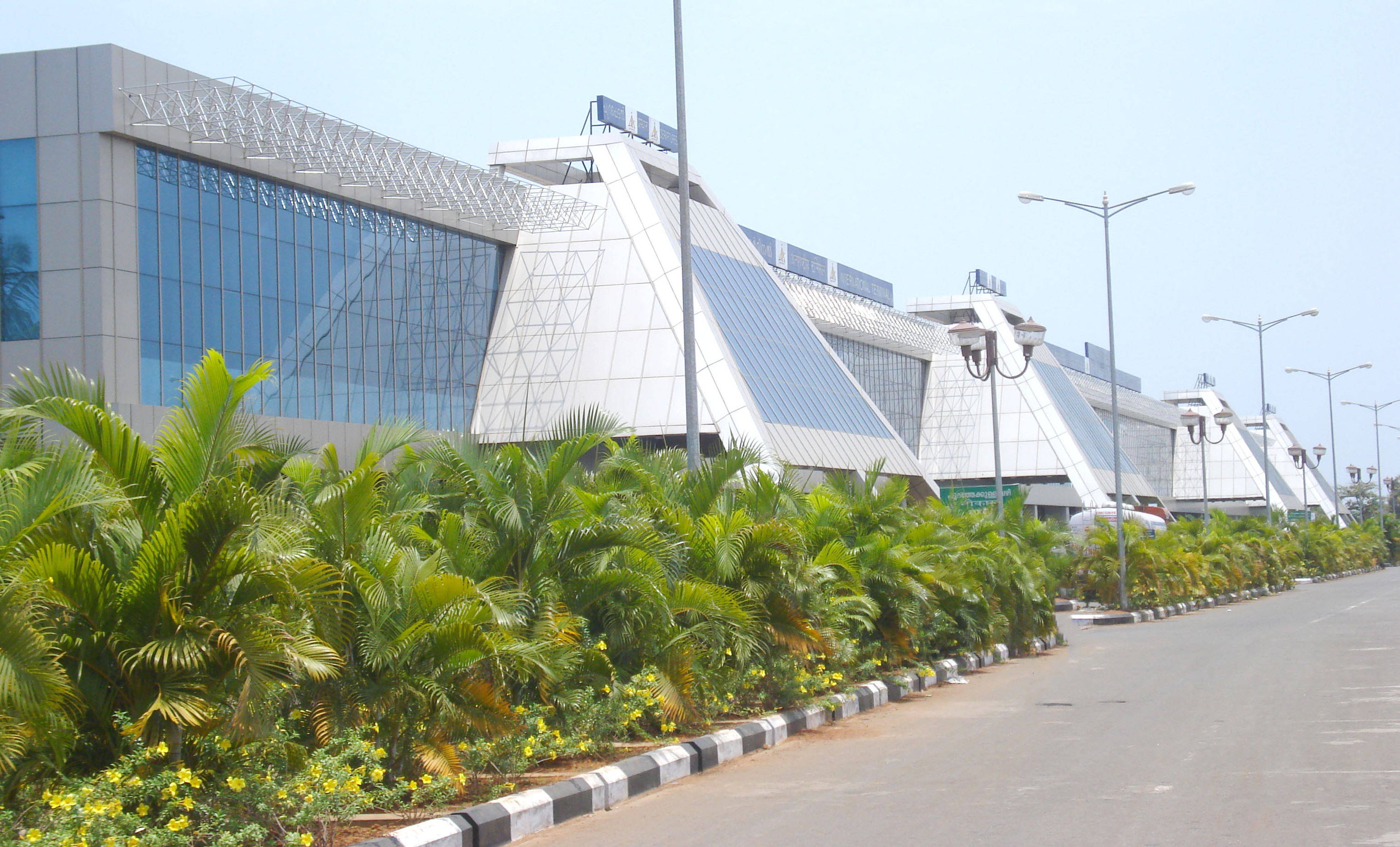
- Clockwise from top: Manjeri town, Chamravattom Regulator-cum-Bridge, Payyanad stadium, Maha Kavi Moyinkutty Vaidyar Smarakam, Karipur International Airport, University of Calicut, Malappuram Down Hill, Ponnani harbour

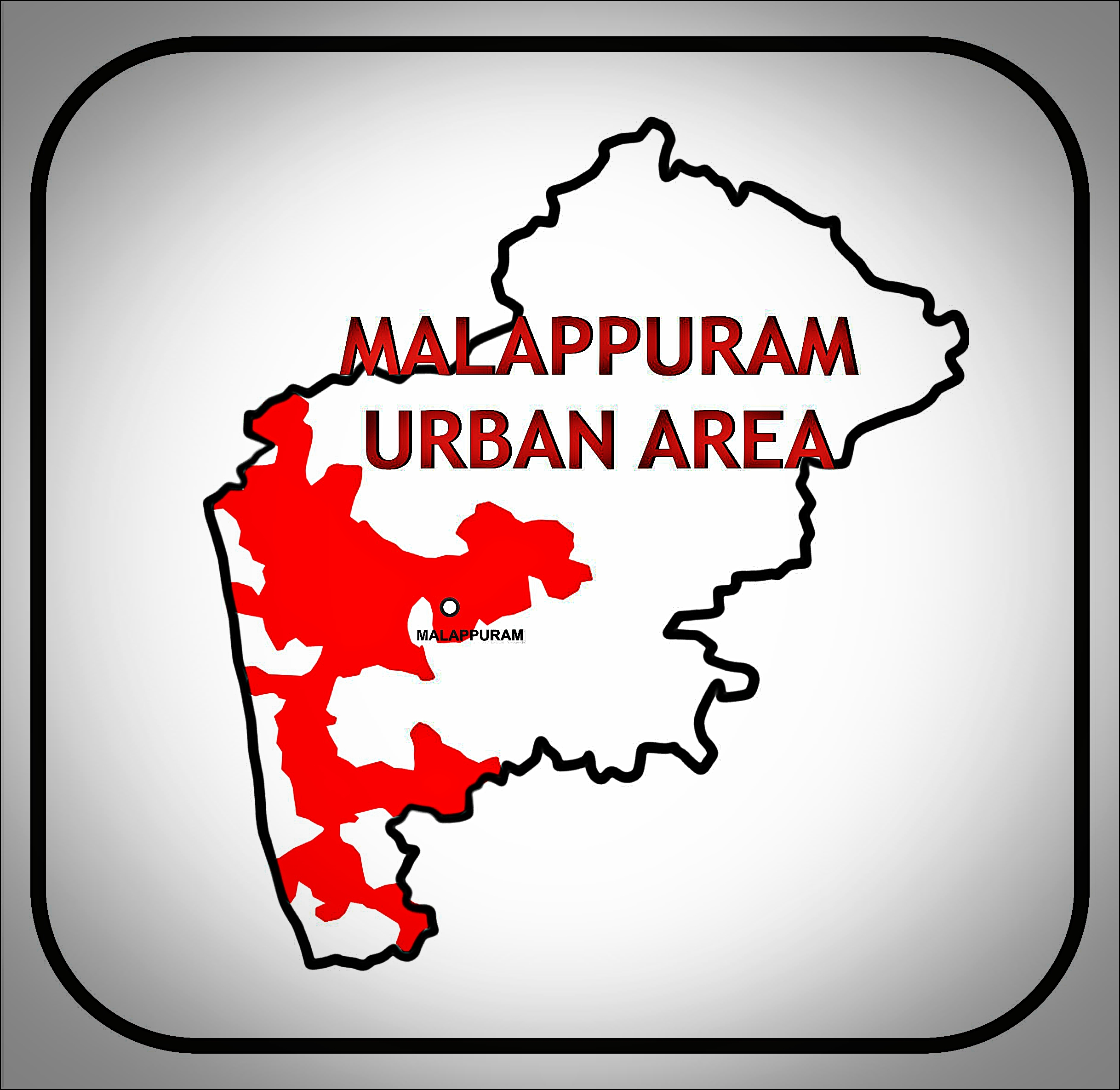
- Malappuram metropolitan area
- Country: India
- State: Kerala
- District: Malappuram

Area
  - Total: 858 km^{2} (331 sq mi)

Population (2011)
  - Total: 1,729,522
  - Density: 2,020/km^{2} (5,220/sq mi)

Languages
  - Official: Malayalam, English
- Time zone: UTC+5:30 (IST)
- Vehicle registration: KL-10, KL-55, KL-84, KL-65, KL-53, KL-54
- City: Malappuram
- Sex ratio: 1102 ♀/1000♂
- Literacy: 94.14%

The Malappuram Metropolitan Area or Malappuram Urban Agglomeration is an urban agglomeration centred around the city of Malappuram, Kerala, India. It is the 32nd largest urban agglomeration in India and the 4th largest in Kerala.

It consists of Malappuram municipality, its adjoining municipalities, and census towns. It has a population of 1.7 million as per the 2011 Census of India. It is the only city in Kerala with a million-plus urban agglomeration that is yet to be upgraded to a Municipal Corporation. It is the fastest-growing metropolitan area in the world with a 44.1% urban growth between 2015 and 2020 as per the survey conducted by Economist Intelligence Unit (EIU) based on urban area growth during January 2020. As of 2011, Malappuram metropolitan area has a literacy rate of 94.14%, which is higher than the national urban average of 85%.

== Constituents of the urban agglomeration ==
According to the 2011 census, the Malappuram metropolitan area comprises the following constituents:

Census town: A census town is a village that meets certain urban criteria: it has a population of at least 5,000, a population density of 400 persons per sq. km or more, and at least 75% of its male working population is engaged in non-agricultural activities. Unlike statutory towns, census towns are administered by gram panchayats rather than municipalities.

No.	Location	Type	Population (2011)
1	Malappuram	Municipality	101,387
2	Manjeri	Municipality	97,104
3	Ponnani	Municipality	90,491
4	Kondotty	Municipality	59,256
5	Tirurangadi	Municipality	56,632
6	Tirur	Municipality	56,058
7	Kottakkal	Municipality	44,382
8	Valanchery	Municipality	40,318
9	Thennala	Census town	56,546
10	Moonniyur	Census town	55,535
11	Vengara	Census town	48,600
12	Tanalur	Census town	47,976
13	Pallikkal Bazar	Census town	46,962
14	Kodur	Census town	45,459
15	Abdu Rahiman Nagar	Census town	41,993
16	Kannamangalam	Census town	41,260
17	Triprangode	Census town	41,167
18	Nannambra	Census town	40,543
19	Othukkungal	Census town	39,139
20	Vazhayur	Census town	36,909
21	Parappur	Census town	36,270
22	Koottilangadi	Census town	36,602
23	Neduva	Census town	35,996
24	Thalakkad	Census town	35,820
25	Maranchery	Census town	35,011
26	Peruvallur	Census town	34,941
27	Chelembra	Census town	34,149
28	Alamcode	Census town	33,918
29	Edappal	Census town	32,550
30	Thenhipalam	Census town	32,045
31	Cheriyamundam	Census town	31,212
32	Irimbiliyam	Census town	30,635
33	Cherukavu	Census town	30,126
34	Oorakam	Census town	29,157
35	Perumanna	Census town	27,278
36	Kalady	Census town	25,872
37	Ponmundam	Census town	25,855
38	Kuttippuram	Census town	25,750
39	Tirunavaya	Census town	24,790
40	Ariyallur	Census town	22,558
41	Naduvattom	Census town	21,273

== Proposed Malappuram Municipal Corporation ==
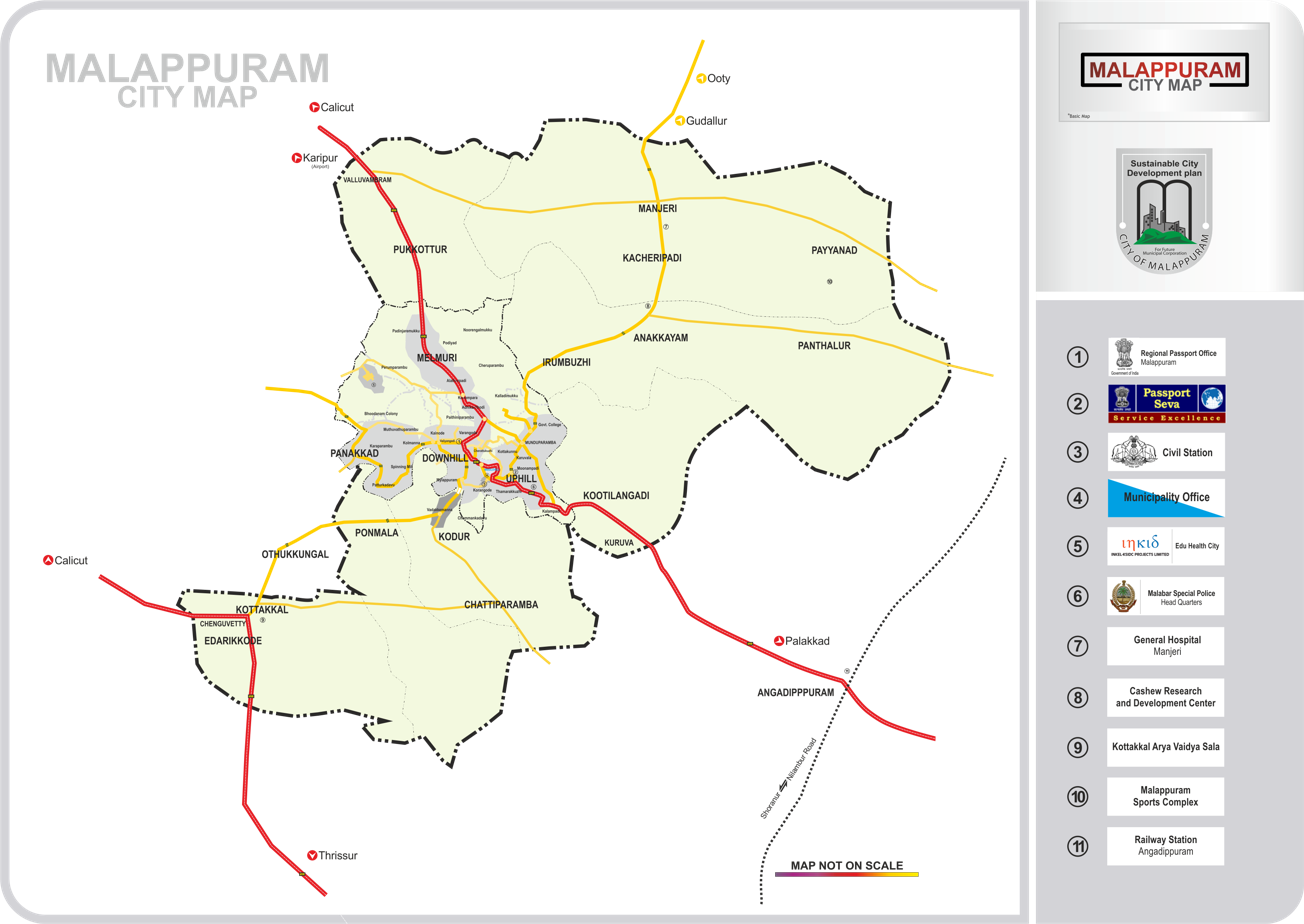
Malappuram City Map showing proposed corporation limit

Malappuram is the only million-plus urban agglomeration (metropolitan area) of Kerala which has no municipal corporation within its limit. However, there is a demand to upgrade the Malappuram Municipality into a Municipal Corporation by incorporating the local bodies in Greater Malappuram region. The proposed Malappuram Municipal Corporation comprises:

- Malappuram Municipality
- Manjeri Municipality
- Kottakkal Municipality
- Anakkayam Outgrowth
- Trikkalangode, a suburb village of Manjeri
- Koottilangadi, a suburb village of Malappuram
- Pookkottur, a suburb village of Malappuram
- Kodur, a suburb village of Malappuram
- Ponmala, a suburb village of Malappuram
- Othukkungal, an outgrowth of Malappuram
- Makkaraparamba

== Proposed Metro rail ==
Malappuram Metro is a proposed rapid transit system for Malappuram metropolitan area, In 2025, The Malappuram District Body has also examined the feasibility of implementing a metro rail project for the Malappuram metropolitan area and its suburbs. Tirur Constituency Legislator Kurukkoli Moideen has submitted an initial report on a detailed feasibility study on the feasibility of implementing the project and presented a motion in the Kerala Assembly for this purpose

== See also ==
- Administration of Malappuram
- Education in Malappuram
- History of Malappuram
- List of desoms in Malappuram (1981)
- List of Gram Panchayats in Malappuram
- List of people from Malappuram
- List of villages in Malappuram
- Transportation in Malappuram
- Malappuram district
- South Malabar
