= List of gram panchayats in Malappuram district =

Gram Panchayats of Malappuram
- Local Self Government Institutions in the district
- Category: Gram Panchayats
- Location: Malappuram district
- Number: 94 Gram Panchayats
- Government: Local Self Government Department, Government of Kerala
- Subdivisions: Block Panchayats

Malappuram is one of the 14 districts in the southern Indian state of Kerala. Kerala, with appreciative development indicators comparable to developed countries, has been experimenting with decentralization and participatory local democracy, ultimately aimed at the realization of the constitutional goal of establishing genuine "institutions of local self-government" since the enactment of Kerala Panchayat Raj Act & The Kerala Municipality Act in the year 1994. Gram Panchayats are the basic units of rural governance in the decentralized system.

== Overview ==
Malappuram is the most populous and the third-largest district in the state. The rural district is divided into 94 Gram Panchayats which are included in 15 blocks namely Areekode, Kalikavu, Kondotty, Kuttippuram, Malappuram, Mankada, Nilambur, Perinthalmanna, Perumpadappu, Ponnani, Tanur, Tirur, Tirurangadi, Vengara, and Wandoor. These blocks combine to form the Malappuram district Panchayat, which is the apex district body of rural governance. Malappuram District Panchayat is the largest District Panchayat as well as the largest local self-government body in the state. The 94 Gram Panchayats are again divided into 1,778 wards. Census towns (small towns with urban features) also come under the jurisdiction of Gram Panchayats. Though the draft notifications for the formation of new Gram Panchayats namely Anamangad, Ananthavoor, Arakkuparamba, Ariyallur, Chembrassery, Elankur, Karipur, Kootayi, Kurumbalangode, Marutha, Pang, Vaniyambalam, and Velimukku were published in 2015, they are yet to be formed. With their formation, the number of Gram Panchayats in the district will become 106.

== List of Gram Panchayats in the district ==
An election map showing the results of 2020 Kerala local elections in Malappuram district

Distribution of Population in Local Bodies (2011)

	Gram Panchayat	Area (in km^{2})	Population (2011)	Wards	Taluk	Ruling Alliance
Areekode Block						UDF
1	Areekode	12.21	31,563	18	Eranad	UDF
2	Cheekkode	23.96	32,867	18	Kondotty	UDF
3	Edavanna	52.10	46,128	22	Eranad	LDF
4	Kavanoor	31.30	37,977	19	Eranad	UDF
5	Kizhuparamba	14.99	22,062	14	Eranad	UDF
6	Kuzhimanna	22.05	34,413	18	Kondotty	UDF
7	Pulpatta	30.12	42,683	21	Eranad	UDF
8	Urangattiri	76.09	40,318	21	Eranad	UDF
Kalikavu Block						UDF
9	Amarambalam	84.64	35,975	19	Nilambur	LDF
10	Chokkad	76.08	32,224	18	Nilambur	UDF
11	Edappatta	25.77	22,729	15	Perinthalmanna	UDF
12	Kalikavu	92.00	35,210	19	Nilambur	UDF
13	Karulai	131.31	23,277	15	Nilambur	UDF
14	Karuvarakundu	78.69	41,583	21	Nilambur	LDF
15	Tuvvur	31.38	40,297	17	Nilambur	UDF
Kondotty Block						UDF
16	Chelembra	15.91	34,149	18	Kondotty	UDF
17	Cherukavu	16.87	36,773	19	Kondotty	UDF
18	Muthuvallur	21.49	26,028	15	Kondotty	UDF
19	Pallikkal	25.96	46,962	22	Kondotty	UDF
20	Pulikkal	28.70	40,133	21	Kondotty	LDF
21	Vazhayur	21.19	30,262	17	Kondotty	LDF
22	Vazhakkad	23.89	35,774	19	Kondotty	UDF
Kuttippuram Block						UDF
23	Athavanad	26.77	41,187	22	Tirur	UDF
24	Edayur	30.43	36,498	19	Tirur	UDF
25	Irimbiliyam	24.06	30,635	17	Tirur	UDF
26	Kalpakanchery	16.25	33,721	19	Tirur	UDF
27	Kuttippuram	31.32	47,023	23	Tirur	UDF
28	Marakkara	27.00	40,404	20	Tirur	UDF
Malappuram Block						UDF
29	Anakkayam	45.23	50,634	23	Eranad	UDF
30	Kodur	18.42	38,258	19	Perinthalmanna	UDF
31	Morayur	24.57	25,261	18	Kondotty	UDF
32	Othukkungal	17.28	39,139	20	Tirurangadi	UDF
33	Ponmala	21.65	33,922	18	Tirur	UDF
34	Pookkottur	20.63	28,077	19	Eranad	UDF
Mankada Block						UDF
35	Koottilangadi	21.54	36,602	19	Perinthalmanna	UDF
36	Kuruva	35.77	45,354	22	Perinthalmanna	UDF
37	Makkaraparamba	11.17	18,702	13	Perinthalmanna	UDF
38	Mankada	31.00	32,748	18	Perinthalmanna	UDF
39	Moorkanad	17.60	36,324	19	Perinthalmanna	LDF
40	Puzhakkattiri	22.72	29,886	17	Perinthalmanna	UDF
Nilambur Block						UDF
41	Chaliyar	125.00	20,834	14	Nilambur	LDF
42	Chungathara	129.69	36,269	20	Nilambur	UDF
43	Edakkara	58.09	28,162	16	Nilambur	UDF
44	Moothedam	48.00	33,960	15	Nilambur	UDF
45	Pothukal	77.00	29,561	17	Nilambur	LDF
46	Vazhikkadavu	114.00	47,322	23	Nilambur	UDF
Perinthalmanna Block						UDF
47	Aliparamba	34.37	41,725	21	Perinthalmanna	UDF
48	Angadipuram	38.50	56,451	23	Perinthalmanna	UDF
49	Elamkulam	21.31	26,456	16	Perinthalmanna	UDF
50	Keezhattur	40.00	36,317	19	Perinthalmanna	UDF
51	Melattur	27.24	27,250	16	Perinthalmanna	LDF
52	Pulamantol	32.15	37,785	20	Perinthalmanna	LDF
53	Thazhekode	45.02	41,982	21	Perinthalmanna	LDF
54	Vettathur	35.84	37,456	16	Perinthalmanna	UDF
Perumpadappu Block						LDF
55	Alamkode	20.50	33,918	19	Ponnani	LDF
56	Maranchery	20.47	35,011	19	Ponnani	LDF
57	Nannamukku	19.35	28,989	17	Ponnani	LDF
58	Perumpadappu	15.02	29,766	18	Ponnani	LDF
59	Veliyankode	15.15	32,554	18	Ponnani	UDF
Ponnani Block						LDF
60	Edappal	23.70	32,550	19	Ponnani	LDF
61	Vattamkulam	20.73	36,147	19	Ponnani	UDF
62	Thavanur	25.28	34,500	19	Ponnani	LDF
63	Kalady	16.48	25,872	16	Ponnani	UDF
Tanur Block						UDF
64	Cheriyamundam	11.95	31,212	18	Tirur	UDF
65	Niramaruthur	9.20	29,846	17	Tirur	LDF
66	Ozhur	15.92	34,016	18	Tirur	UDF
67	Perumanna-Klari	11.48	27,278	16	Tirur	UDF
68	Ponmundam	9.16	25,855	16	Tirur	UDF
69	Tanalur	15.12	47,976	23	Tirur	LDF
70	Valavannur	15.28	33,159	19	Tirur	UDF
Tirur Block						LDF
71	Purathur	19.50	31,915	19	Tirur	LDF
72	Thalakkad	16.30	35,820	19	Tirur	LDF
73	Tirunavaya	19.59	45,848	23	Tirur	UDF
74	Triprangode	20.67	41,167	21	Tirur	LDF
75	Vettom	13.46	28,104	20	Tirur	LDF
76	Mangalam	12.17	33,442	20	Tirur	UDF
Tirurangadi Block						UDF
77	Moonniyur	22.66	55,535	23	Tirurangadi	UDF
78	Nannambra	18.35	40,543	21	Tirurangadi	UDF
79	Vallikkunnu	25.14	48,006	23	Tirurangadi	LDF
80	Thenhipalam	17.98	32,045	17	Tirurangadi	UDF
81	Peruvallur	21.19	34,941	19	Tirurangadi	UDF
Vengara Block						UDF
82	Abdu Rahiman Nagar	14.83	41,993	21	Tirurangadi	UDF
83	Edarikode	15.65	27,356	16	Tirurangadi	UDF
84	Kannamangalam	28.24	41,260	20	Tirurangadi	UDF
85	Oorakam	21.65	29,157	17	Tirurangadi	UDF
86	Parappur	18.50	36,270	19	Tirurangadi	UDF
87	Thennala	10.00	29,190	17	Tirurangadi	UDF
88	Vengara	18.66	48,600	23	Tirurangadi	UDF
Wandoor Block						UDF
89	Mampad	84.67	37,221	19	Nilambur	LDF
90	Pandikkad	57.01	55,213	23	Eranad	UDF
91	Porur	35.60	37,636	17	Nilambur	UDF
92	Thiruvali	33.83	27,734	16	Nilambur	LDF
93	Trikkalangode	59.99	52,090	23	Eranad	UDF
94	Wandoor	45.45	49,013	23	Nilambur	UDF
Sources: 2011 Census of India, Government of Kerala

== See also ==
- Malappuram District Panchayat
- List of villages in Malappuram district
- List of Desoms in Malappuram district (1981)
