= List of census towns in Kerala =

The article lists the census towns in Kerala state of India. There exists a total number of 461 census towns in the state. A census town is notified only if it has a minimum population of 5000, at least 75% of the male working population engaged in non-agricultural pursuits and a population density of 400 per sq.km. Census towns are governed by gram panchayats.

== List of census towns ==
district	census town	total	ref
Alappuzha	Arookutty	33	
Alappuzha	Aroor	33	
Alappuzha	Bharanikkavu	33	
Alappuzha	Chennithala	33	
Alappuzha	Cheppad	33	
Alappuzha	Chingoli	33	
Alappuzha	Ezhupunna	33	
Alappuzha	Kandalloor	33	
Alappuzha	Kanjikkuzhi	33	
Alappuzha	Kannamangalam	33	
Alappuzha	Karthikappally	33	
Alappuzha	Kattanam	33	
Alappuzha	Keerikkad	33	
Alappuzha	Kodamthuruth	33	
Alappuzha	Kokkothamangalam	33	
Alappuzha	Komalapuram	33	
Alappuzha	Krishnapuram	33	
Alappuzha	Kumarapuram	33	
Alappuzha	Kurattissery	33	
Alappuzha	Kuthiathode	33	
Alappuzha	Mannanchery	33	
Alappuzha	Mannar	33	
Alappuzha	Muhamma	33	
Alappuzha	Muthukulam	33	
Alappuzha	Pallippuram	33	
Alappuzha	Pathirappally	33	
Alappuzha	Pathiyoor	33	
Alappuzha	Puthuppally	33	
Alappuzha	Thaikattussery	33	
Alappuzha	Thanneermukkam	33	
Alappuzha	Thazhakara	33	
Alappuzha	Vayalar	33	
Alappuzha	Total	33	
Malappuram	Abdu Rahiman Nagar	39	
Malappuram	Alamcode	39	
Malappuram	Ariyallur	39	
Malappuram	Chelambra	39	
Malappuram	Cheriyamundam	39	
Malappuram	Cherukavu	39	
Malappuram	Edappal	39	
Malappuram	Irimbiliyam	39	
Malappuram	Kalady	39	
Malappuram	Kannamangalam	39	
Malappuram	Kattipparuthi	39	
Malappuram	Kizhuparamba	39	
Malappuram	Kodur	39	
Malappuram	Kondotty	39	
Malappuram	Koottilangadi	39	
Malappuram	Kottakkal	39	
Malappuram	Kuttippuram	39	
Malappuram	Marancheri	39	
Malappuram	Moonniyur	39	
Malappuram	Naduvattom	39	
Malappuram	Nannambra	39	
Malappuram	Neduva	39	
Malappuram	Nilambur	39	
Malappuram	Othukkungal	39	
Malappuram	Pallikal	39	
Malappuram	Parappur	39	
Malappuram	Perumanna	39	
Malappuram	Peruvallur	39	
Malappuram	Ponmundam	39	
Malappuram	Talakkad	39	
Malappuram	Tanalur	39	
Malappuram	Thenhippalam	39	
Malappuram	Thennala	39	
Malappuram	Thirunavaya	39	
Malappuram	Tirurangadi	39	
Malappuram	Triprangode	39	
Malappuram	Urakam	39	
Malappuram	Vazhayur	39	
Malappuram	Vengara	39	
Total			

== See also ==
- List of most populous urban agglomerations in Kerala
- Demographics of Kerala
