= Tirurangadi Taluk Office =

Historical building in Kerala, India

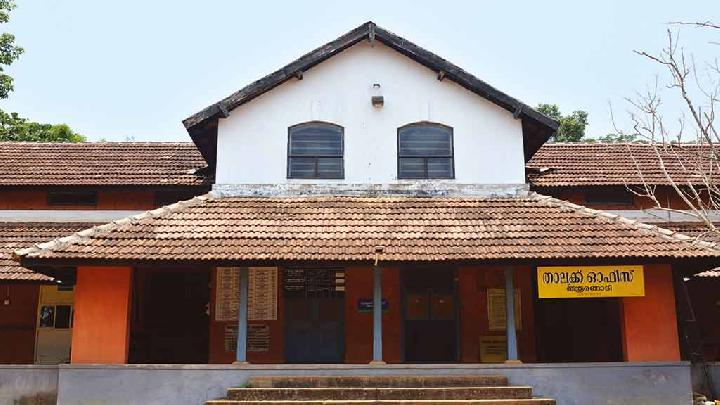
Hajur Kacheri

The Tirurangadi Taluk Office, also known as Hajur Kacheri, is a historic building located in Tirurangadi Talk of Malappuram District in the Indian state of Kerala. It houses the Tirurangadi Taluk Office since the post-independence Malabar District or British-era Madras Presidency. The Taluk office, which was once the Hajur Kacheri (Huzur Office) under the British, was one of the major administrative centers of the British government in Malabar region. The building also functioned as the headquarters of a short-lived Khilafat government during the rebellion.

== History ==
Tirurangadi was the capital of Cheranad taluk under the British Raj, which was the epicenter of the Khilafat movement and Malabar Rebellion (Moplah revolt) in 1921. The building was known as the Hajur Kacheri (Huzur Office) under the British, and was one of the major administrative centers of the post-independence British-era Madras Presidency. The building also functioned as the headquarters of a short-lived Khilafat government during the rebellion.

According to historians, there was a fort of Tipu Sultan situated opposite the Hajur Kacheri. The land described in the records as 'Kottapparamba' does not have any trace of a fort today. In the 1780s and 1790s, the British defeated the Mysore Army at Tirurangadi and after the treaty of Srirangapatnam in 1791, and took control of Tirurangadi and demolished the fort. It is said that the bricks and stones from the demolished fort were used for building Hajur Kacheri. The police station, offices of deputy tehsildar and sub registrar, post office and travelers’ bungalow functioned at this building.

During the Khilafat Movement, the Mappila warriors, under the leadership of cleric Ali Musliyar and Variyam Kunnath Kunjahammed Haji (V K Haji), captured the taluks of Eranadu and Valluvanadu from the British and established their own rule and turned the building into their administrative headquarters where they had the court, administrative section and even the office for the issuance of passports.

== Premises ==
The building premises has the graves of British officers who had laid down their lives in the 1921 Moplah Revolt This includes that of Lt. William Rutherfoord Johnstone, Private F. M. Eley, Private H. C. Hutchings and William John Duncan Rowley who was the Assistant Superintendent of Police from Palghat who was killed at the outbreak of the Rebellion on 20 August 1921 at the age of 28. Though the building is under the Archaeological department, the Taluk office is still functioning. The Sub Registrar Office, Tirurangadi also works in the same compound. The state government is planning to declare it as a district heritage site and to convert it into a museum.

== Tirurangadi Taluk ==
Tirurangadi Taluk
- Taluk
- Location in Malappuram district, Kerala, India
- Coordinates: 11.152610°N 75.956678°E
- Country: India
- State: Kerala
- District: Malappuram
- Headquarters: Tirurangadi

Languages
  - Official: Malayalam, English
- Time zone: UTC+5:30 (IST)
- Vehicle registration: KL-65

Tirurangadi Taluk comes under Tirur revenue division in Malappuram district of Kerala, India. Its headquarters is the town of Tirurangadi. Tirurangadi Taluk contains two municipalities - Tirurangadi, and Parappanangadi. Most of the administrative offices are located in the Mini-Civil Station at Tirurangadi. The position of the Tirurangadi Taluk in Malappuram district is given below:

The Tirurangadi Taluk is composed of 17 villages. They are:

- Parappur
- Abdu Rahiman Nagar
- Thenhipalam
- Peruvallur
- Oorakam
- Nannambra
- Vengara
- Kannamangalam
- Othukkungal
- Vallikunnu
- Moonniyur
- Ariyallur
- Tirurangadi
- Neduva
- Parappanangadi
- Thennala
- Edarikode

== Gallery ==
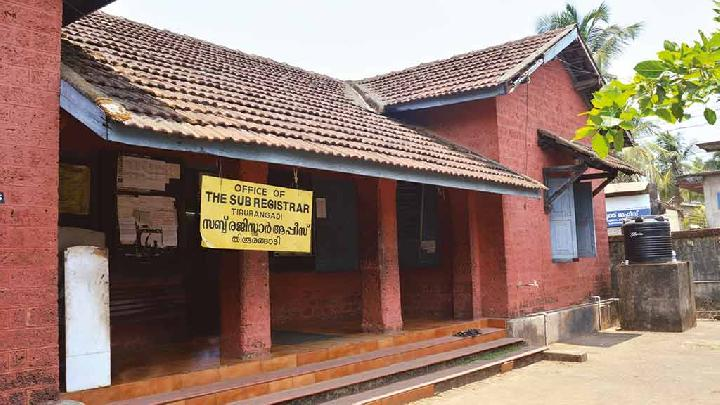
Sub Registrar Office which is also located in the same compound

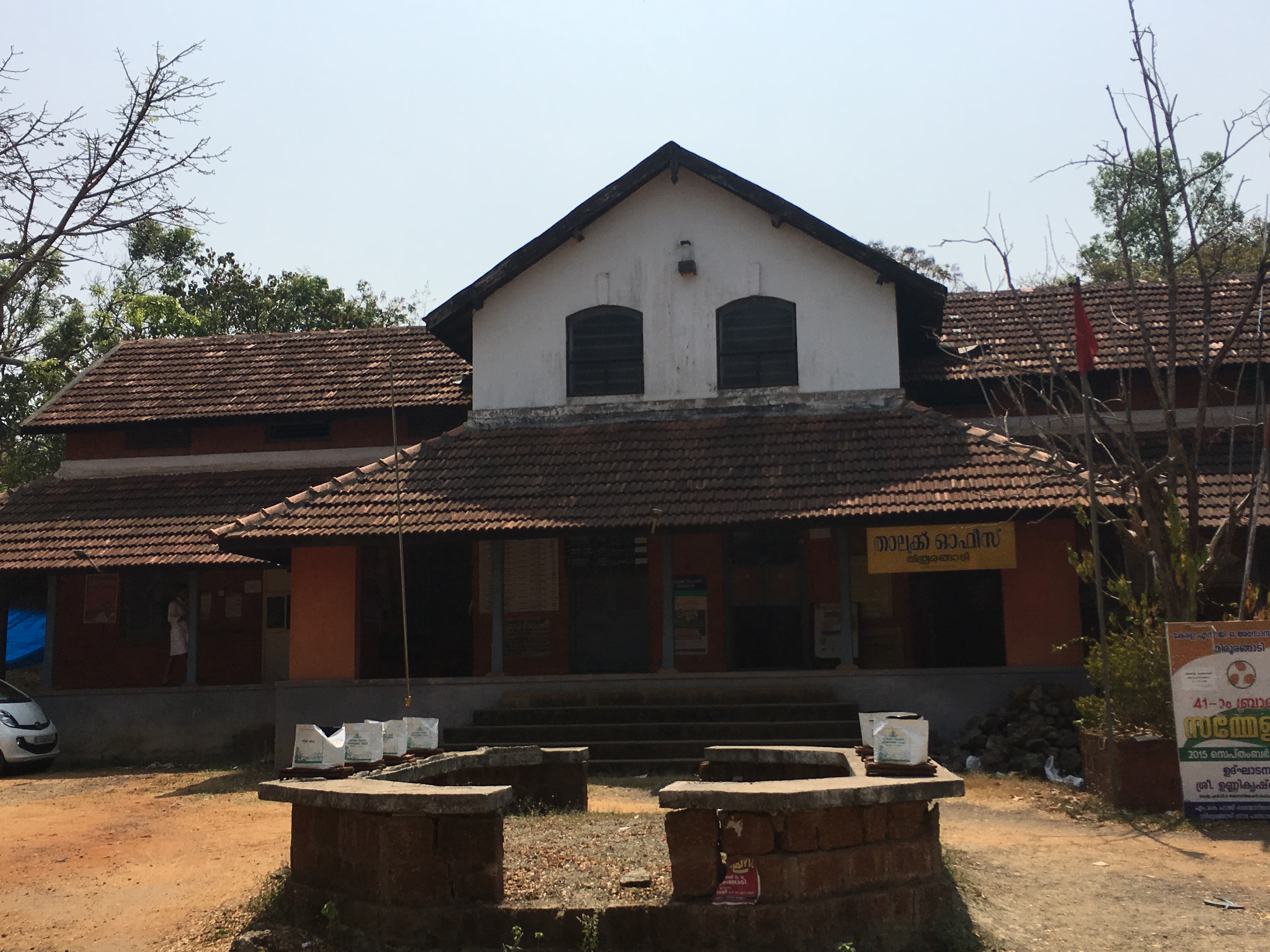
An old photo of the Tirurangadi Taluk Office

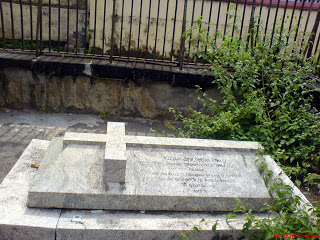
The epitaph read: William John Duncan Rowley, Assistant Superintendent of Police, Palghaut, who was killed at Tirurangadi by a mob of mappilas at the outbreak of the Mappila Rebellion on August 20, 1921 - aged 28

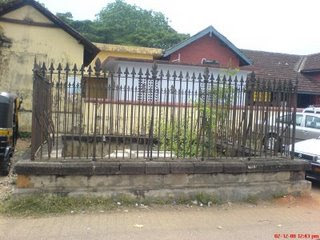
Graves of British soldiers who had laid down their lives in the 1921 Moplah Revolt

== See also ==
- List of villages in Malappuram district
- List of Gram Panchayats in Malappuram district
- List of desoms in Malappuram district (1981)
- Revenue Divisions of Kerala
