= List of cities and towns in Kerala =

This is a list of cities and towns in the state of Kerala, India with their population.

== History ==
The urban councils of Kerala date back to the 17th century, when the Dutch Malabar established the municipality of Fort Kochi. In 1664, the municipality of Fort Kochi was established by Dutch Malabar, making it the first municipality in the Indian subcontinent, which was dissolved when the Dutch authority got weaker in the 18th century. However, the first modern kind of municipalities were formed in the state in 1866 in Malabar District. In 1866, Fort Kochi municipality was reestablished. Kannur, Thalassery, Kozhikode, Palakkad, and Fort Kochi, which were parts of Malabar District until 1956, were made the first modern municipalities of Kerala on 1 November 1866, according to the Madras Act 10 of 1865 (Amendment of the Improvements in Towns act 1850) of the British Indian Empire. The Thiruvananthapuram Municipality came into existence in 1920. After two decades, during the reign of Sree Chithira Thirunal, Thiruvananthapuram Municipality was converted into a corporation on 30 October 1940, making it the oldest municipal corporation of Kerala. The first municipal corporation formed after the independence of India as well as the second-oldest municipal corporation of the state is Kozhikode Municipal Corporation, established in 1962.

== List ==
Population and area refer to the boundaries defined under the respective municipal corporations/municipalities/census towns, not necessarily the actual urban area.

Rank	City/town	Population (2025)	Area(km^{2})	Density (/km^{2)}	District
Municipal Corporations
1	Thiruvananthapuram	957,730	214.86	4,427	Thiruvananthapuram
2	Kochi	677,381	96.88	6,345	Ernakulam
3	Kozhikode	609,224	118.58	5,138	Kozhikode
4	Kollam	397,419	72.19	5,379	Kollam
5	Thrissur	315,957	101.42	3,115	Thrissur
6	Kannur	232,486	78.35	2,967	Kannur
Municipalities
7	Alappuzha	174,164	46.20	3,770	Alappuzha
8	Kottayam	136,812	55.4	2,469	Kottayam
9	Palakkad	131,019	26.60	4,926	Palakkad
10	Manjeri	97,102	53.06	1,830	Malappuram
11	Thalassery	92,558	23.96	3,863	Kannur
12	Thrippunithura	92,522	29.17	3,172	Ernakulam
13	Ponnani	90,491	24.82	3,646	Malappuram
14	Vatakara	75,295	21.32	3,532	Kozhikode
15	Kanhangad	73,536	39.54	1,860	Kasaragod
16	Payyanur	72,111	54.63	1,320	Kannur
17	Koyilandy	71,873	29.05	2,474	Kozhikode
18	Parappanangadi	71,239	22.25	3,202	Malappuram
19	Kalamassery	71,038	27.00	2,631	Ernakulam
20	Kodungallur	70,868	29.24	2,424	Thrissur
21	Neyyattinkara	70,840	28.78	2,461	Thiruvananthapuram
22	Tanur	69,534	19.49	3,568	Malappuram
23	Kayamkulam	68,634	21.79	3,150	Alappuzha
24	Malappuram	68,127	33.61	2,027	Malappuram
25	Guruvayur	67,006	29.66	2,259	Thrissur
26	Thrikkakkara	65,984	28.10	2,348	Ernakulam
27	Irinjalakuda	62,521	33.57	1,862	Thrissur
28	Wadakkancherry	61,341	51.56	1,190	Thrissur
29	Nedumangad	60,161	32.53	1,849	Thiruvananthapuram
30	Kondotty	59,256	30.93	1,916	Malappuram
31	Tirurangadi	56,632	17.73	3,194	Malappuram
32	Tirur	56,058	16.55	3,387	Malappuram
33	Panoor	55,216	28.53	1,935	Kannur
34	Kasaragod	54,172	16.69	3,246	Kasaragod
35	Feroke	54,074	15.54	3,480	Kozhikode
36	Kunnamkulam	54,071	34.18	1,582	Thrissur
37	Ottappalam	53,792	32.68	1,646	Palakkad
38	Thiruvalla	52,883	27.15	1,948	Pathanamthitta
39	Thodupuzha	52,025	35.43	1,468	Idukki
40	Ettumanoor	51,129	27.8	1,829	Kottayam
41	Perinthalmanna	49,723	34.41	1,445	Malappuram
42	Karunagappalli	49,604	18.65	2,660	Kollam
43	Chalakudy	49,525	25.23	1,963	Thrissur
44	Payyoli	49,470	22.34	2,214	Kozhikode
45	Koduvally	48,687	23.85	2,041	Kozhikode
46	Mananthavady	47,974	80.10	599	Wayanad
47	Changanassery	47,685	13.50	3,532	Kottayam
48	Mattanur	47,078	54.32	867	Kannur
49	Punalur	46,659	34.45	1,354	Kollam
50	Nilambur	46,366	30.79	1,506	Malappuram
51	Cherthala	45,827	16.19	2,831	Alappuzha
52	Sultan Bathery	45,417	102.24	444	Wayanad
53	Maradu	44,704	12.35	3,620	Ernakulam
54	Kottakkal	44,382	20.45	2,170	Malappuram
55	Taliparamba	44,247	18.96	2,334	Kannur
56	Shornur	43,528	32.34	1,346	Palakkad
57	Pandalam	42,793	28.42	1,506	Pathanamthitta
58	Kattappana	42,646	52.77	808	Idukki
59	Cherpulassery	41,267	32.00	1,290	Palakkad
60	Mukkam	40,670	31.20	1,304	Kozhikode
61	Iritty	40,369	45.84	881	Kannur
62	Valanchery	40,318	21.90	1,841	Malappuram
63	Varkala	40,048	15.42	2,597	Thiruvananthapuram
64	Nileshwaram	39,752	26.23	1,515	Kasaragod
65	Chavakkad	39,095	12.41	3,150	Thrissur
66	Kothamangalam	38,837	40.04	970	Ernakulam
67	Pathanamthitta	37,545	23.50	1,598	Pathanamthitta
68	Attingal	37,382	16.87	2,216	Thiruvananthapuram
69	Paravur	37,245	16.19	2,300	Kollam
70	Ramanattukara	35,937	11.70	3,072	Kozhikode
71	Mannarkkad	34,839	33.01	1,055	Palakkad
72	Erattupetta	34,814	18.29	1,903	Kottayam
73	Sreekandapuram	33,489	68.72	487	Kannur
74	Angamaly	33,465	20.45	1,633	Ernakulam
75	Chittur-Thathamangalam	32,298	14.71	2,196	Palakkad
76	Kalpetta	31,580	40.74	775	Wayanad
77	North Paravur	31,493	9.02	3,492	Ernakulam
78	Haripad	30,977	19.24	1,610	Alappuzha
79	Muvattupuzha	30,397	13.18	2,306	Ernakulam
80	Kottarakara	29,788	17.39	1,713	Kollam
81	Kuthuparamba	29,619	16.76	1,767	Kannur
82	Adoor	29,165	20.42	1,428	Pathanamthitta
83	Pattambi	28,632	15.84	1,808	Palakkad
84	Anthoor	28,218	24.12	1,170	Kannur
85	Perumbavoor	28,105	13.61	2,065	Ernakulam
86	Piravom	27,229	29.36	927	Ernakulam
87	Mavelikkara	26,421	12.65	2,089	Alappuzha
88	Eloor	25,297	11.21	2,257	Ernakulam
89	Chengannur	23,466	14.60	1,607	Alappuzha
90	Vaikom	23,245	8.73	2,663	Kottayam
91	Aluva	22,428	7.14	3,141	Ernakulam
92	Pala	22,056	16.06	1,373	Kottayam
93	Koothattukulam	17,523	23.18	756	Ernakulam

== See also ==
- List of census towns in Kerala
