= Malappuram District Panchayat =

Rural governing body in Kerala, India

Malappuram District Panchayat Malappuram Jilla Panchayat
- District: Malappuram
- Seat: Civil station, Malappuram
- Wards/Divisions: 33

Government
  - Body: District Panchayat Council
  - President: P. A. Jabbar Haji (IUML)
  - Vice President: Adv. A. P. Smiji (IUML)
  - Secretary: P. M. Rajeev

Area
  - Total: 3,554 km^{2} (1,372 sq mi)

Population (2011)
  - Total: 4,112,920
  - Density: 1,157/km^{2} (2,997/sq mi)
- Website: malappuramdp.lsgkerala.gov.in/en/

Malappuram District Panchayat, also known as Malappuram District Council is the apex rural local government body in Malappuram district, Kerala, and the highest tier of the state's three-tier Panchayati Raj system. The Malappuram District Panchayat has jurisdiction over Malappuram District, except for the 12 municipal towns. It is headquartered in Malappuram and is divided into 33 territorial divisions, each represented by an elected member. The Kerala State Election Commission is responsible for conducting these elections.

== Block councils in jurisdiction ==
Malappuram District Panchayat comprises 15 block panchayats: Areacode, Kondotty, Kalikavu, Kuttippuram, Malappuram, Mankada, Nilambur, Perinthalmanna, Perumpadappu, Ponnani, Tanur, Tirur, Tirurangadi, Vengara and Wandoor.

== Governance ==
The district panchayat is headed by a president and vice president, who are elected from among its members. It has five standing committees, each headed by a chairperson elected from among its members. The committees are responsible for matters relating to Finance, Development, Health and Education, Welfare, and Public Works. The district panchayat secretary, appointed by the state government, is responsible for its administration, serves as its chief executive officer, and implements the decisions of the district panchayat.

== Present Council (2025-2031) ==
The incumbent president is P. A. Jabbar Haji, while the Vice President is A. P. Smiji; both are members of the Indian Union Muslim League (IUML).

== Wards/Divisions ==
Following the 2026 ward delimitation, the Malappuram District Panchayat comprises 33 territorial divisions.

No.	Division	Elected member (2026)	Party
1	Vazhikkadavu	N. A. Kareem	IUML
2	Moothedam	Raihanath Kurumadan	IUML
3	Wandoor	Alipatta Jameela	IUML
4	Karuvarakundu	Musthafa Abdul Latheef	IUML
5	Melattur	K. T. Ajmal	IUML
6	Elamkulam	Sajitha Teacher	IUML
7	Angadippuram	C. Sukumaran	IUML
8	Anakkayam	Shahina Niyazi	IUML
9	Makkaraparamba	K. P. Asmabi	IUML
10	Kulathur	Fousiya Perumballi	IUML
11	Kadampuzha	Dr. K. P. Waheeda	IUML
12	Kuttippuram	Vaseema Velery	IUML
13	Thavanur	Mehrunnisa K. P.	IUML
14	Changaramkulam	Ashhar Perumukku	IUML
15	Marancheri	Sulaikha Razak	IUML
16	Thirunnavaya	Shareefabi N. P.	IUML
17	Mangalam	Aarathi Pradeep	IUML
18	Puthanathani	Vettam Alikoya	IUML
19	Ponmundam	Basheer Randathani	IUML
20	Thanalur	Adv. A. P. Smiji (Vice President)	IUML
21	Nannambra	Shareef Kuttoor	IUML
22	Othukkungal	K. V. Muhammadali	IUML
23	Pookkottur	Ayishabanu P. H.	IUML
24	Cherur	Yasmin Arimbra	IUML
25	Vengara	P. K. Aslu	IUML
26	Velimukku	Haneefa Munniyur	IUML
27	Thenhippalam	Shaji Pacheri	IUML
28	Pulikkal	V. P. Shejini Unni	IUML
29	Vazhakkad	Jaisal Elamaram	IUML
30	Areacode	P. A. Jabbar Haji (President)	IUML
31	Thrikkalangode	P. H. Shamim	IUML
32	Edavanna	K. T. Ashraf	IUML
33	Chungathara	Adv. Josmi Thomas	INC

== Infrastructure ==
Malappuram District Panchayat manages three government district hospitals, located in Tirur, Nilambur and Perinthalmanna. It also manages government high schools and higher secondary schools in the district, except those located within municipal areas.

== See also ==
- List of gram panchayats in Malappuram district
