= Panthavoor =

- Village
- Location in Kerala, India Panthavoor (India)
- Coordinates: 10°45′18″N 76°01′13″E
- Country: India
- State: Kerala
- District: Malappuram
- Subdistrict: Ponnani
- Time zone: UTC+05:30 (IST)

Panthavoor is a small village in Ponnani taluk of Malappuram district in the Indian state of Kerala. This village stands in Alamkode Panchayath.

== Transportation ==
Panthavoor village connects to other parts of India through Kuttippuram town. National highway No.66 passes through Edappal and the northern stretch connects to Goa and Mumbai. The southern stretch connects to Cochin and Trivandrum. National Highway No.966 connects to Palakkad and Coimbatore. The nearest airport is at Kozhikode. The nearest major railway station is at Kuttippuram.
