= Puthupparamb =

Puthuparamb is a village in the Malappuram District of Kerala, India. It is a predominantly Muslim area; Hindus exist in comparatively smaller numbers.
