= Olavattur =

Village in Kerala, India

Olavattur Puthiyedath Parambu
- Village
- Interactive map of Olavattur
- Coordinates: 11.2044°N 75.9496°E
- Country: India
- State: Kerala
- District: Malappuram

Population (2001)
  - Total: 20,256

Languages
  - Official: Malayalam, English
- Time zone: UTC+5:30 (IST)
- PIN: 673638
- Vehicle registration: KL-84

Olavattur or Puthiyedath Parambu is a village in Malappuram district in the state of Kerala, India.
