= Moorkkanad =

Gram panchayat in Malappuram district, Kerala, India

Moorkkanad Moorkanad
- Gram panchayat
- Location within Kerala Location within India
- Country: India
- State: Kerala
- District: Malappuram
- Taluk: Perinthalmanna

Government
  - Body: Moorkkanad Grama Panchayat
- Time zone: UTC+5:30 (IST)
- Postal code: 679338

Moorkkanad is a gram panchayat in the Malappuram district of Kerala, India. It is located in Perinthalmanna taluk.

== Geography ==
Moorkkanad is located in central Malappuram district near the Kunthipuzha River.

== Administration ==
Moorkkanad is governed by a grama panchayat under Mankada block.

== Transport ==
Moorkkanad is connected to Perinthalmanna and nearby towns by road.

== Notable sites ==
Notable sites in the village include:

- A local landmark, the Shiva temple, which is 1500 years old.
- The Cheriyil Bhagavathi temple, which comes under the Cheriyil Nair Kudumbakshema trust
- The local Roman Catholic Saint Antony's Church.
- The local, and only, school is St. Antony's High School, which comes under the Catholic Diocese of Irinjalakuda.

== Access and amenities ==
Moorkkanad is accessible from Karuvannur Valiyapalam and from Karuvannur puthan thode. It is 1.5 km from Valiyapalam and 2 km from Puthenthode. Many buses run from Trichur and Irinjalakuda via Moorkkanad which go to Katoor, Karalam, Edamuttam and Triprayar.

The village has a high literacy rate and there is a strong emphasis on education and healthcare, which contributes to the reputation of the area. Moorkkand has a primary health centre and two anganvadis (play schools/pre-schools), which are administered by the Government of Kerala. The village also has an art and sports club named Kerala Athletic Club and a village library named Grammeena Vayanasala, both more than 50 years old.

Moorkkanad has a branch post office, which comes under the Karuvanoor main post office. Its postal code is 680711. There is a BSNL rural telephone exchange.

== Water ==
Moorkkanad Illikkal Sluice is on the Karuvannur River. The shutters of this sluice help to hold back water, which is used for the irrigation of paddyfields in the Kole wetlands in the adjoining areas during the period from December to May. Hidayathul Islam Madrasa is near to the Illikkal Dam, as is a water pumping station.
