= Vettikkattiri =

- village
- Location in Kerala, India Vettikkattiri (India)
- Coordinates: 11°7′0″N 76°11′0″E
- Country: India
- State: Kerala
- District: Malappuram

Government
  - Body: Pandikkad

Population (2011)
  - Total: 22,333

Languages
  - Official: Malayalam, English
- Time zone: UTC+5:30 (IST)
- PIN: 676521
- Telephone code: 0483
- Vehicle registration: KL-10
- Nearest city: Manjeri
- Lok Sabha constituency: Malappuram
- Vidhan Sabha constituency: Manjeri
- Civic agency: Pandikkad
- Website: www.vettikkattiri.com

Vettikkattiri is a village in Malappuram district in the state of Kerala, India.

== Demographics ==
As of 2011 India census, Vettikkattiri had a population of 22,333 with 10,742 males and 11591 females.

== Transportation ==
Vettikkattiri village connects to other parts of India through Manjeri . National Highway No.66 passes through Parappanangadi and the northern stretch connects to Goa and Mumbai. The southern stretch connects to Cochin and Trivandrum. National Highway No.966 connects to Palakkad and Coimbatore. The nearest airport is at Kozhikode. The nearest major railway station is at Tirur.
