= Moorkanad =

- village
- Location in Kerala, India Moorkanad (India)
- Coordinates: 10.915951°N 76.140747°E
- Country: India
- State: Kerala
- District: Malappuram

Population (2001)
  - Total: 31,488

Languages
  - Official: Malayalam, English
- Time zone: UTC+5:30 (IST)
- PIN: 679338
- Vehicle registration: KL-53

Moorkanad is a village in Malappuram district in the state of Kerala, India.

== Demographics ==
As of 2001 India census, Moorkanad had a population of 31488 with 15126 males and 16362 females.

== Culture ==
Moorkanad village is a predominantly Muslim populated area. Hindus exist in comparatively smaller numbers. So the culture of the locality is based upon Muslim traditions. Duff Muttu, Kolkali and Aravanamuttu are common folk arts of this locality. There are many libraries attached to mosques giving a rich source of Islamic studies. Most of the books are written in Arabi-Malayalam which is a version of the Malayalam language written in Arabic script. People gather in mosques for the evening prayer and continue to sit there after the prayers discussing social and cultural issues. Business and family issues are also sorted out during these evening meetings. The Hindu minority of this area keeps their rich traditions by celebrating various festivals in their temples. Hindu rituals are done here with a regular devotion like other parts of Kerala.

== Transportation ==
Moorkanad village connects to other parts of India through valanchery town. National highway No.66 passes through valanchery and the northern stretch connects to Goa and Mumbai. The southern stretch connects to Cochin and Trivandrum. National Highway No.966 connects to Palakkad and Coimbatore. The nearest airport is at Kozhikode. The nearest major railway station is at Kuttippuram.
