= Perakamanna, Areekode =

Perakamanna Othayi
- village
- Location in Kerala, India Perakamanna (India)
- Coordinates: 11.2138700°N 76.127040°E
- Country: India
- State: Kerala
- District: Malappuram

Population (2011)
  - Total: 19,696

Languages
  - Official: Malayalam, English
- Time zone: UTC+5:30 (IST)
- PIN: 676541
- Vehicle registration: KL-10

Perakamanna is a village in Malappuram district in the state of Kerala, India.

== Demographics ==
As of 2011 India census, Perakamanna had a population of 19696 with 9631 males and 10065 females.

== Transportation ==
Perakamanna village connects to other parts of India through Feroke town on the west and Nilambur town on the east. National highway No.66 passes through Pulikkal and the northern stretch connects to Goa and Mumbai. The southern stretch connects to Cochin and Trivandrum. State Highway No.28 starts from Nilambur and connects to Ooty, Mysore and Bangalore through Highways.12,29 and 181. The nearest airport is at Kozhikode. The nearest major railway station is at Feroke.
