= Ezhuvathiruthy =

Village in India

Ezhuvathiruthy is a village at Ponnani taluk, Malappuram district, Kerala, India.
