= Vellayoor =

Village in Malappuram District, Kerala, India

Vellayoor is a village in Kalikavu Panchayat, Nilambur taluk in Malappuram district in the state of Kerala.

== Transportation ==
Vellayoor village connects to other parts of India through Nilambur town. State Highway No.28 starts from Nilambur and connects to Ooty, Mysore and Bangalore through Highways.12,29 and 181. National highway No.66 passes through Ramanattukara and the northern stretch connects to Goa and Mumbai. The southern stretch connects to Cochin and Trivandrum state. The nearest airport is at Kozhikode and the nearest major railway station is at Feroke.
