= Kattipparutti =

Kattipparuthi
- Census town
- Location in Kerala, India Kattipparuthi (India)
- Coordinates: 10°53′0″N 76°3′0″E
- Country: India
- State: Kerala
- District: Malappuram

Population (2011)
  - Total: 40,318

Languages
  - Official: Malayalam, English
- Time zone: UTC+5:30 (IST)
- PIN: 676552
- Vehicle registration: KL-

Kattipparuthi is a census town in the Malappuram district of Kerala, India. It is a part of the Valanchery municipality.

== Demographics ==
As of 2011 India census, Kattipparuthi had a population of 40,318, with 19,407 males and 20,911 females.

== Transportation ==
Kattipparuthi village connects to other parts of India through Kuttippuram town. National highway No.66 passes through Edappal and the northern stretch connects to Goa and Mumbai. The southern stretch connects to Cochin and Trivandrum. National Highway No.966 connects to Palakkad and Coimbatore. The nearest airport is at Kozhikode. The nearest major railway station is at Kuttippuram.
