= Neduva =

- Census town
- Location in Kerala, India Neduva (India)
- Coordinates: 11°3′30″N 75°51′25″E
- Country: India
- State: Kerala
- District: Malappuram

Population (2011)
  - Total: 35,996

Languages
  - Official: Malayalam, English
- Time zone: UTC+5:30 (IST)
- PIN: 676303, 676319
- Vehicle registration: KL-

Neduva is a census town in Malappuram district in the state of Kerala, India.

== Demographics ==
As of 2011 India census, Neduva had a population of 35,996, with 17,308 males and 18,688 females. The number of households were 6,833.

== Transportation ==
The nearest airport is Calicut Airport, located near Kondotty in Malappuram district. The nearest major railway station is Parappanangadi Railway Station.
