= Kavanoor =

Kavanoor Moothedathu Parambu
- Town
- Location in Kerala, India Kavanoor (India)
- Coordinates: 11°11′0″N 76°4′0″E
- Country: India
- State: Kerala
- District: Malappuram
- Seat: Eranad

Government
  - Type: Local Self Government Department, Kerala
  - Body: Panchayat

Population (2011)
  - Total: 37,977

Languages
  - Official: Malayalam, English
- Time zone: UTC+5:30 (IST)
- PIN: 673639/673644
- Vehicle registration: KL-10

Kavanoor is a town near Areekode in Malappuram district in the Indian state of Kerala.

== Name ==
The name of the town is spelled in English either Kavanoor or Kavanur or even Kavannur. Kavanur is the first high tech village office in Kerala.The origin of this name is unknown. But earlier the present Town known as Kavanoor was known as Moothedathuparampu. Later when the Grama Panchayath and Village were formed they were known as Kavanur or Kavanoor and gradually the Town itself got well known in the same name. Even today the old Town Sunni Juma Masjid has "Kavanur- Moothedathu Parampu" in its records as place name.

== Demographics ==
As of 2011 India census, Kavanoor had a population of 37,977 with 18,813 males and 19,164 females.

== Culture ==
There is an official library run by the Grama Panchayath. Since the town is the headquarters of the Gramapanhayath, people from all other parts of the Panchayath come to Kavanoor town for their various requirements like Hospital, Revenue, Shopping, Education, etc. People often gather in open areas in the evenings for socializing where discussions on political and social issues are quite common.

== Transport ==
The Town has all types of road transport system. Since it is on the State Highway Tamarassery- Manjeri it has public buses to all major towns like Mukkom, Tamarasseri, Manjeri, Tirur, Malappuram, Perinthalmanna, and neighbouring district major towns like Palakkad, Thrissur, Wayanad, Kannur. The town is rich with more than 600 Autorikshas for easy access. Taxi cars available in Plenty. Besides there are few tourist bus operators who provide bus, Travellers, Minivans etc for any type pleasure trips.

The nearest Railway stations are Perinthalamanna to the North (34Km) and Nilambur to the East (27KM). The nearest air port is Karippur, called Calicut International Airport. Chaliyar is the nearest river, which cater to the water needs of the Town and neighboring areas.

== Water supply ==
The town has a public well which was donated by then Kovilakam, the rich landlords of the ancient time. The well is still available but was encircled by a private building in at the centre of the town very close to the Irivetty road. Besides a new public water supply programmes are going to be commissioned soon which makes purified water available at all parts of the Panchayath, including the Town. It is prestigious initiative by the present MLA Basheer PK.

== History ==
The actual name of the present Kavanoor was Moothedathu Parambu, and the Kavanoor was the name of neighbourhood in the west. But when the present town developed as the centre of commerce and business people began to use Kavanoor for the Town. Even today old folks use Moothedathu parambu.
