= Nannamukku =

Coordinates: 10°43′N 76°02′E

- village
- Interactive map of Nannamukku
- Country: India
- State: Kerala
- District: Malappuram

Population (2011)
  - Total: 28,989

Languages
  - Official: Malayalam, English
- Time zone: UTC+5:30 (IST)
- PIN: 679575
- Vehicle registration: KL-
- Nearest city: changaramkulam

Nannamukku is a village in Malappuram district in the state of Kerala, India.

== Demographics ==
As of 2011 India census, Nannamukku had a population of 28989 with 13040 males and 15949 females.

== Transportation ==
Nannamukku village connects to other parts of India through Kuttippuram town. National highway No.66 passes through Edappal and the northern stretch connects to Goa and Mumbai. The southern stretch connects to Cochin and Trivandrum. National Highway No.966 connects to Palakkad and Coimbatore. The nearest airport is at Kozhikode. The nearest major railway station is at Kuttippuram.
