= Porur, Malappuram =

Porur
- Interactive map of Porur
- Coordinates: 11.17840°N 76.18641°E
- Country: India
- State: Kerala

Porur is a small village in the Malappuram district, Kerala, India. Kuttipada and Manjeri are also nearby towns.

== Location ==
Porur is located between Perinthalmanna and Wandoor.

== Transportation ==
Porur village connects to other parts of India through Manjeri town. National Highway No. 66 passes through Parappanangadi and the northern stretch connects to Goa and Mumbai. The southern stretch connects to Cochin and Trivandrum. National Highway No.966 connects to Palakkad and Coimbatore. The nearest airport is at Kozhikode. The nearest major railway station is at Tirur.
