= Trikkalangode =

- Interactive map of Trikkalangode
- Coordinates: 11.1612°N 76.1231°E
- Country: India
- State: Kerala
- District: Malappuram

Population (2011)
  - Total: 15,112
  - Density: 868.31/km^{2} (2,248.9/sq mi)

Languages
  - Official: Malayalam, English
- Time zone: UTC+5:30 (IST)
- PIN: 676123
- Vehicle registration: KL 10

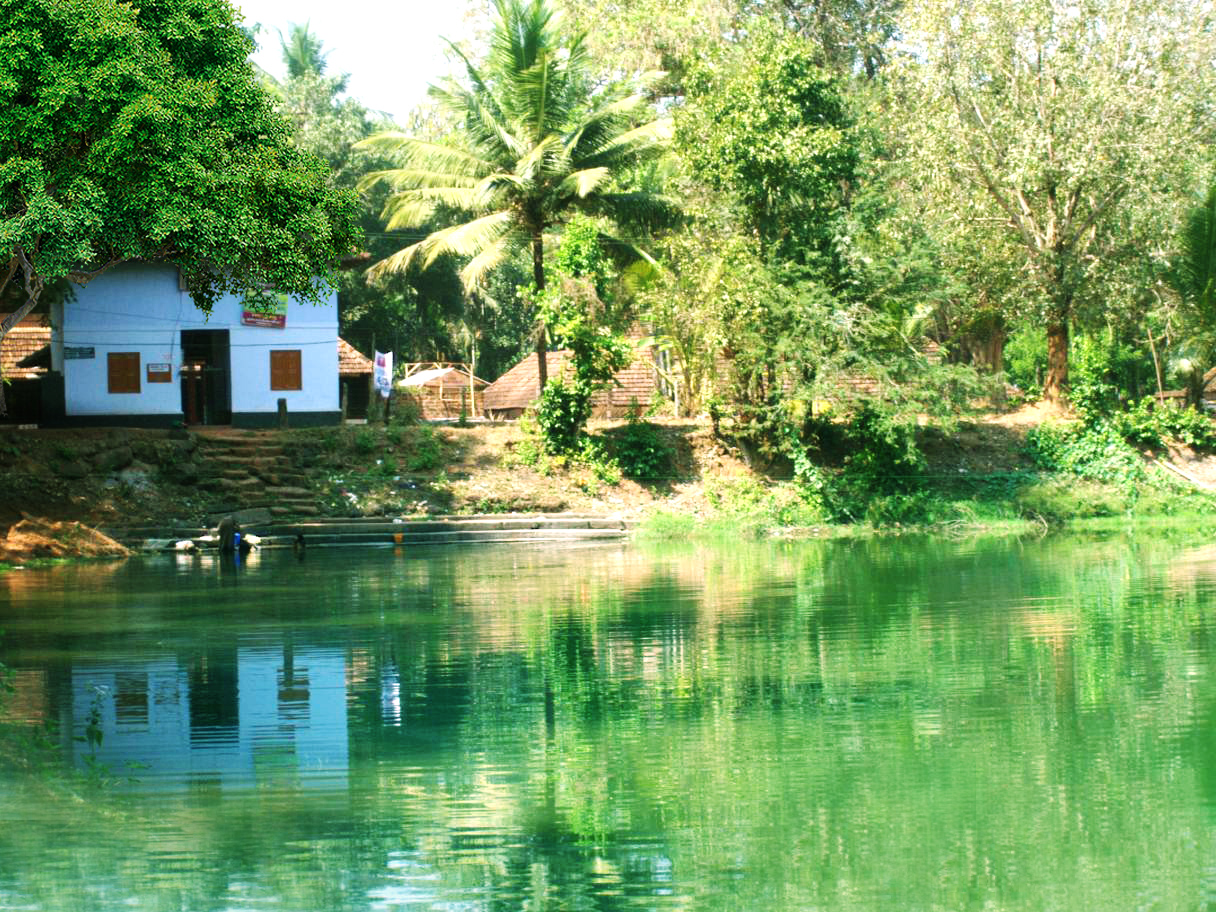
Kuttankulam, Trikkalangode

Trikkalangode is a major Grama Panchayath in Kerala's Ernad (Manjeri) Taluk, Malappuram district, having a population of 3,071 households. According to the 2011 lndian Census, the Trikkalangode Grama Panchayath has a population of 15,112, with 7,385 males and 7,727 females. The population of Trikkalangode village with children aged 0 to 6 is 2,047. The average sex ratio of Trikkalangode is 1046, which is lower than the Kerala state average of 1084. According to census data, the child sex ratio in Trikkalangode is 927, which is lower than the Kerala average of 964.

Trikkalangode has a higher literacy rate than Kerala. across 2011, Trikkalangode's literacy rate was 94.58%, compared to 94.00% across Kerala. In Trikkalangode, male literacy is 96.57%, while female literacy is 92.72%.

According to the Constitution of India and the Panchyati Raj Act, Trikkalangode is governed by a Sarpanch (Village Head), who serves as the elected representative of the village.

== Demographics ==
As of 2011 India census, Trikkalangode had a population of 52090.

== Transportation ==
Trakalangod village connects to other parts of India through Manjeri town (just 4 km (2.5 mi)). National highway No.66 passes through Parappanangadi - Gudellur and the northern stretch connects to Goa and Mumbai. The southern stretch connects to Cochin and Trivandrum. National Highway No.966 connects to Palakkad and Coimbatore. The nearest airport is at Kozhikode. The nearest major railway station is at Tirur.
