= Koottilangadi =

- Neighbourhood / Town
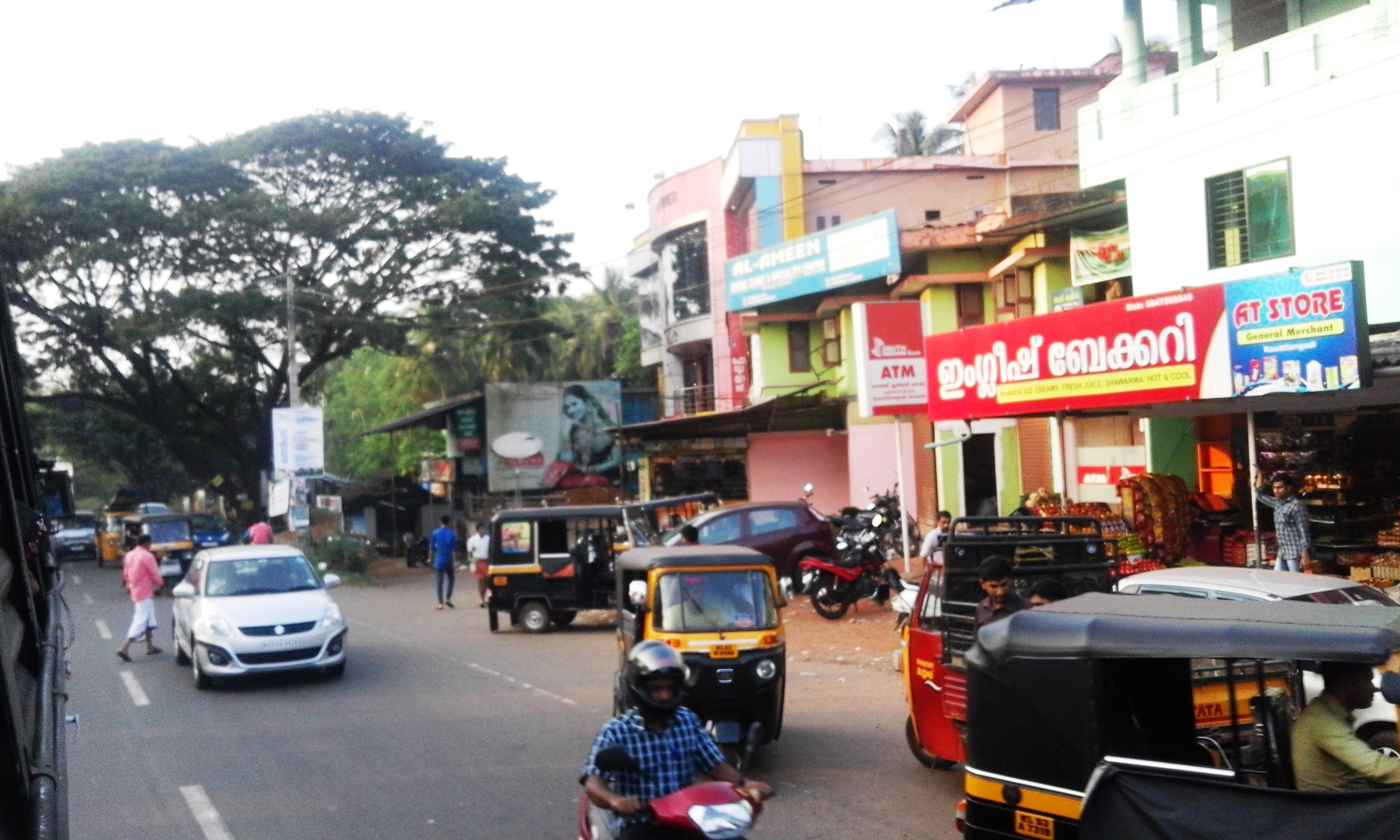
- Koottilangadi Town, Malappuram

- Location in Kerala, India
- Coordinates: 11°2′0″N 76°6′0″E
- Country: India
- State: Kerala
- District: Malappuram

Government
  - Type: Gram Panchayat
  - Body: Koottilangadi Grama Panchayat
  - President: Rasna Muneer (IUML)
  - Vice President: V. Mansoor

Population (2011)
  - Total: 36,602

Languages
  - Official: Malayalam, English
- Time zone: UTC+5:30 (IST)
- PIN: 676506
- Vehicle registration: KL-53
- Nearest city: Malappuram
- Lok Sabha constituency: Malappuram
- Vidhan Sabha constituency: Mankada

Koottilangadi is a census town and outgrowth of Malappuram in the state of Kerala, India. It is a small town situated at the confluence of Kadalundipuzha and Cherupuzha rivers, thus giving the place its name. National highway 966 (formerly NH 213), which connects Calicut with Malappuram and Palakkad, passes through Koottilangadi. Koottilangadi bridge constructed over Kadalundi river is considered as the gateway to Malappuram municipality.

== Demographics ==
As of 2011 India census, Kootilangadi has a population of 36,602 with 17,734 males and 18,868 females. Though officially a panchayat, Kootilangadi being contiguous with Malappuram municipality has grown over the years to be the southern gateway of the city. There are many commercial establishments here along with a small market. There is also a Govt.UP School situated here.
