= Tennala =

Coordinates: 11°00′N 75°56′E

Thennala
- Village
- Interactive map of Thennala
- Country: India
- State: Kerala
- District: Malappuram

Government
  - Type: Grama Panchayath

Population (2011)
  - Total: 56,546

Languages
  - Official: Malayalam, English
- Time zone: UTC+5:30 (IST)
- PIN: 676508
- Vehicle registration: KL-65, KL-55

Thennala is a Grama Panchayat in Malappuram district in the Indian state of Kerala. It is known for its cultured population and localities. National Highway 17 (NH-17) passes through the pookkipparamb. Parapanangadi is the nearest railway station (12 km) and Calicut International Airport is the nearest airport (23 km).

== Demographics ==
As of 2011 India census, Thennala had a population of 56,546 with 26,715 males and 29,831 females.

== Notes ==
The Village office building was inaugurated on October 5, 1998. It is located near the Calicut-Thrissur Highway at Mele Kozhichena, opposite the RRRF Headquarters, within the Thennala Grama Panchayat Office compound. Thennala village shares its borders with Edarikkode, Nannambra, Tirurangadi, and Vengara villages. A resurvey has not been conducted in Thennala village, and the total area of the village is 2,558.67 acres.

Key government offices in the village include the Thennala Grama Panchayat, Krishi Bhavan, Veterinary Hospital, and the Government Community Health Centre (CHC). The majority of the population in the village is Muslim, followed by Hindus, with a small Christian minority. The village is known for its good religious harmony.

Most parts of the village are at a very low altitude. Perumpuzha, a tributary of the Kadalundi River, forms the boundary between Thennala and Vengara villages. The village has historically been rich in agricultural products, particularly arecanut, betel leaves, and pepper. However, agricultural production has declined over time, with many villagers now working in Gulf countries.

Due to the presence of Perumpuzha, various river species endemic to the Malabar region can be found in the village. However, there are no major tourist attractions within Thennala.

== Transport ==
Tennala village connects to other parts of India through Tirur, Tanur, Parappanangadi town. National highway No.66 passes through Pookipparamba, while the northern stretch connects to Goa and Mumbai. The southern stretch connects to Cochin and Trivandrum. State Highway No.28 starts from Nilambur and connects to Ooty, Mysore and Bangalore through Highways.12, 29 and 181.

The nearest airport is at Kozhikode. The nearest major railway station is at tanur.
