= Peruvallur =

- Census town
- Location in Kerala, India Peruvallur (India)
- Coordinates: 11°6′0″N 75°55′40″E
- Country: India
- State: Kerala
- District: Malappuram

Population (2001)
  - Total: 30,624

Languages
  - Official: Malayalam, English
- Time zone: UTC+5:30 (IST)
- PIN: 673638, 676317
- Vehicle registration: KL-84

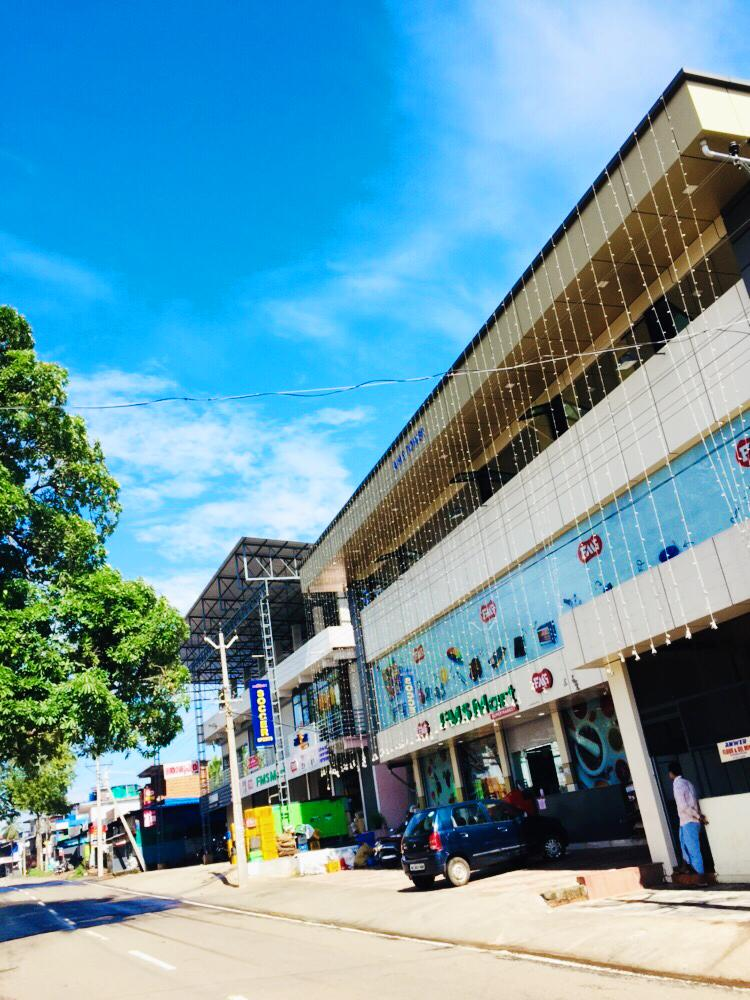
FMS MART Supermarket, Parambilpeedika

Peruvallur is a census town in Tirurangadi Taluk, Malappuram district in the state of Kerala, India. Peruvallur has many agricultural fields and about 35 pure water ponds.

Calicut International Airport is near Peruvallur, and Kondotty and Chemmad and Chelari are the nearest towns. Parambil peedika and Kadappdi are quickly emerging market centres with multistorey buildings and shopping complexes. Many villagers are gulf migrants. As per the current census data, Peruvallur Panchaythu is a census town, and categorised under special Panchaythu. Peruvallur panchayathu was formed in October 2000. K. Kuttyali Haji was first president K Koya Kutti Haji was vice-president of the panchayathu. IUML is the major dominant political party of the panchyathu.

== Demographics ==
As of 2011 India census, Peruvallur had a population of 34,941 with 16,883 males and 18,058 females.

== Schools ==
- Najath Higher Secondary School Unghugal
- Government International H.S.S Peruvallur
- G.L.P.S Peruvallur Nadukkara
- Alfalah Islamic English medium school
- G.L.P.S Parambilpeedika
- I.M.U.P. School Parachenapuraya
- Navabhath Central School Valakandi
- Fullbright Pre Nursery School
- Akhmup School Chathrathodi
- Amlp School Vattapparamb
- Government LP School Olakara
- Tio Up School Valakkandi

PMSA LP school valakkandi'

== Industries ==
- Bismi Avil Food production
- Sun Foods
- Perincheeri Oil Mills
- Peruvallur Wood Industries
- Mezza food products
- Sky Lark Modular Furniture
- Alfa sweet
- A.M. sawmill
- ARAkkal wood industries
- FAMOUS FOOD PRODUCTS

== Transportation ==
Peruvallur village connects to other parts of India through Feroke town on the west and Nilambur town on the east. National highway No.66 passes through Pulikkal and the northern stretch connects to Goa and Mumbai. The southern stretch connects to Cochin and Trivandrum. State Highway No.28 starts from Nilambur and connects to Ooty, Mysore and Bangalore through Highways.12,29 and 181. The nearest airport is at Kozhikode. The nearest major railway station is at Feroke.

== Primary hospitals ==
- C.H.C PARAMBIL PEEDIKA
- ARAKKAL HAJIS AYURVEDA - PARAMBIL PEEDIKA
- A.R Hospital Parambilpeedika
- KOTTAKKAL ARYA VAIDYASALA DEALER PARAMBILPEEDIKA
