= Thalappara =

Thalappara Moonniyur Thalavettipara
- Town
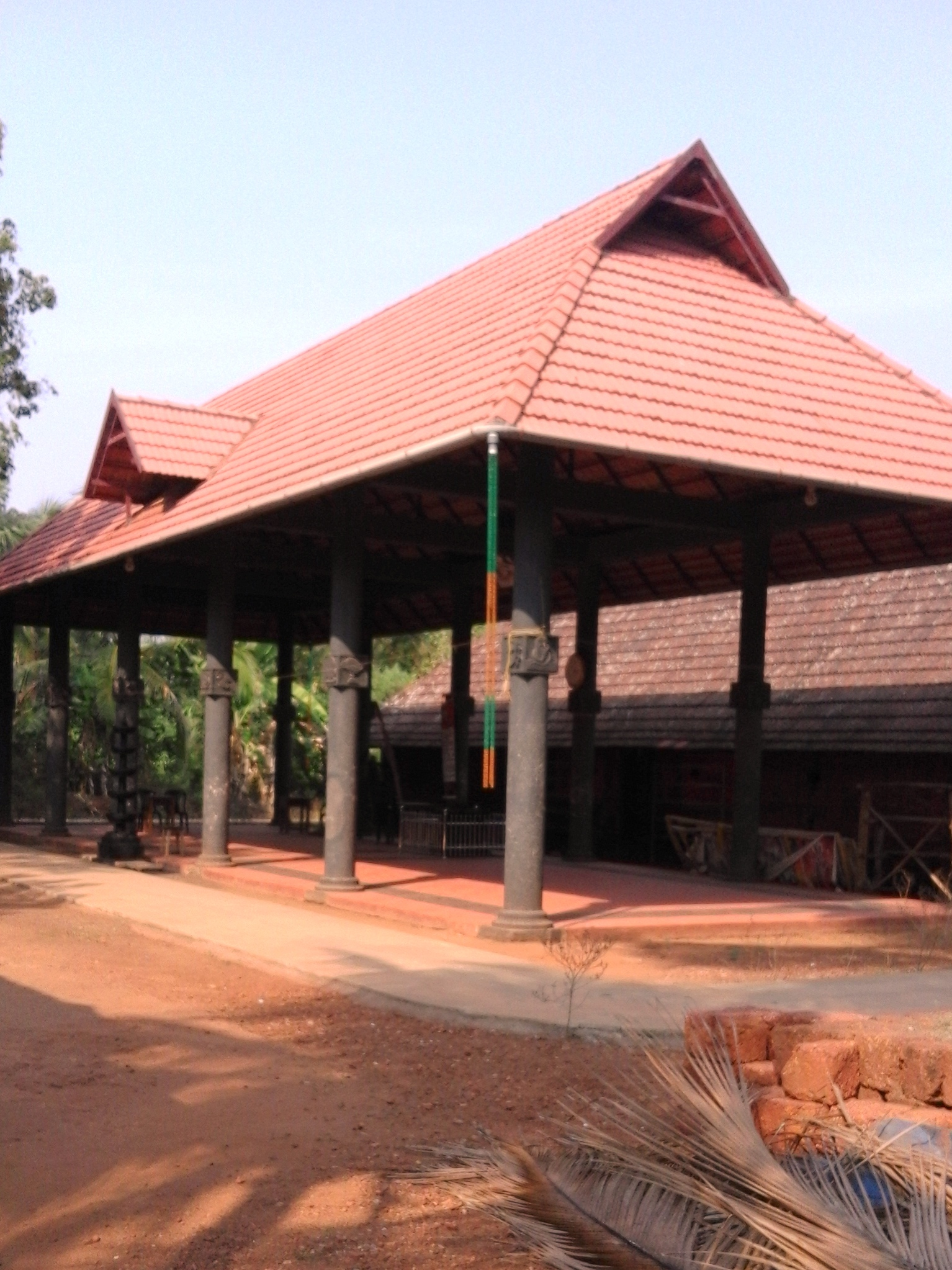
- Shiva temple in Moonniyoor
- Interactive map of Thalappara
- Coordinates: 11°4′20″N 75°54′10″E
- Country: India
- State: Kerala
- District: Malappuram

Languages
  - Official: Malayalam, English
- Time zone: UTC+5:30 (IST)
- Postal code: MOONNIYUR SOUTH: 676311
- Telephone code: 04942
- Vehicle registration: KL-65
- Nearest city: Chemmad
- Lok Sabha constituency: Malappuram

Thalappara is a place located in the Malappuram district of Kerala in India near to Moonniyur. It is on the NH 17. It is located in the highway that connects between Thrissur and Calicut.

The important places around Thalappara are Padikkal, Palakkal, Velimukku, Alinchuvadu, Muttichira, Kaliyatamucku, Parakkdavu, Kunnathu Parambu, Chuzhali, Kalathingalpara, Areeppara, Mullankuzhi and Chekuthan moola .

== Moonniyur Grama Panchayath ==
Thalappara is administered by a local council called Moonniyur Grama Panchayath which includes villages like Muttichira, Velimukku, Palakkal and Panickottumpadi. Next to Mooniyur Panchayath lies Thenipalam Panchayath which comes after Panickottumpadi(Padikkal). The population is 38,000.

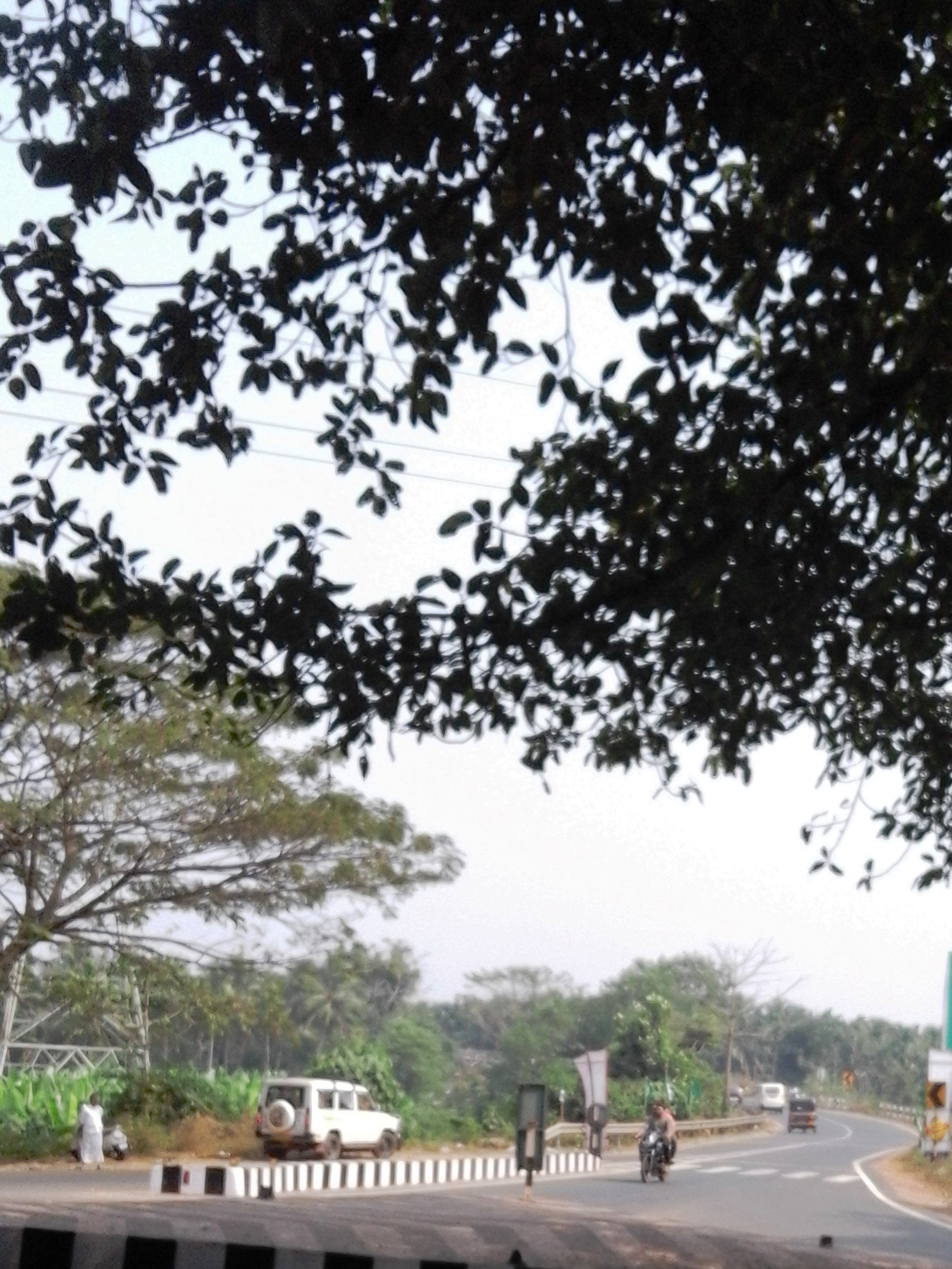
Thalappara Junction

== Transportation ==
Thalappara village connects to other parts of India through Parappanangadi town. National highway No.66 passes through Ramanattukara and the northern stretch connects to Goa and Mumbai. The southern stretch connects to Cochin and Trivandrum. State Highway No.28 starts from Nilambur and connects to Ooty, Mysore and Bangalore through Highways.12,29 and 181. The nearest airport is at Kozhikode. The nearest major railway station is at Parappanangadi.
