= Nannambra =

- Census town
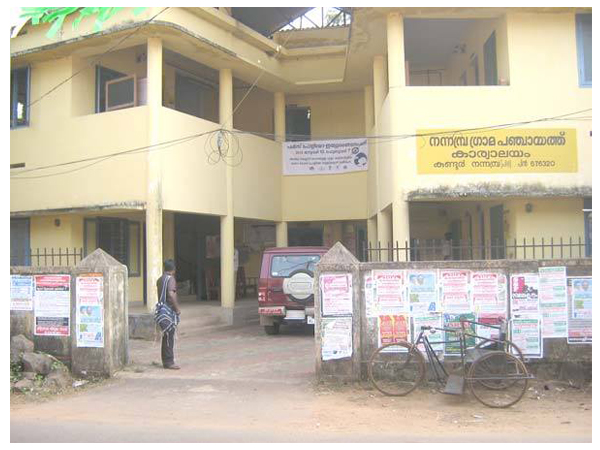
- Nannambra Panchayath
- Interactive map of Nannambra
- Coordinates: 10°59′45″N 75°54′40″E
- Country: India
- State: Kerala
- District: Malappuram

Population (2011)
  - Total: 40,543

Languages
  - Official: Malayalam, English
- Time zone: UTC+5:30 (IST)
- PIN: 676320
- Vehicle registration: KL- 65, KL - 55, KL - 10

Nannambra is a census town in Malappuram district in the state of Kerala, India.

== Demographics ==
As of 2011 India census, Nannambra had a population of 40543 with 19048 males and 21495 females.

== Transportation ==
The nearest airport is at Kozhikode. The nearest major railway station is at Parappanangadi.
