= Eranad =

Eranad Ernad
- Erstwhile Province
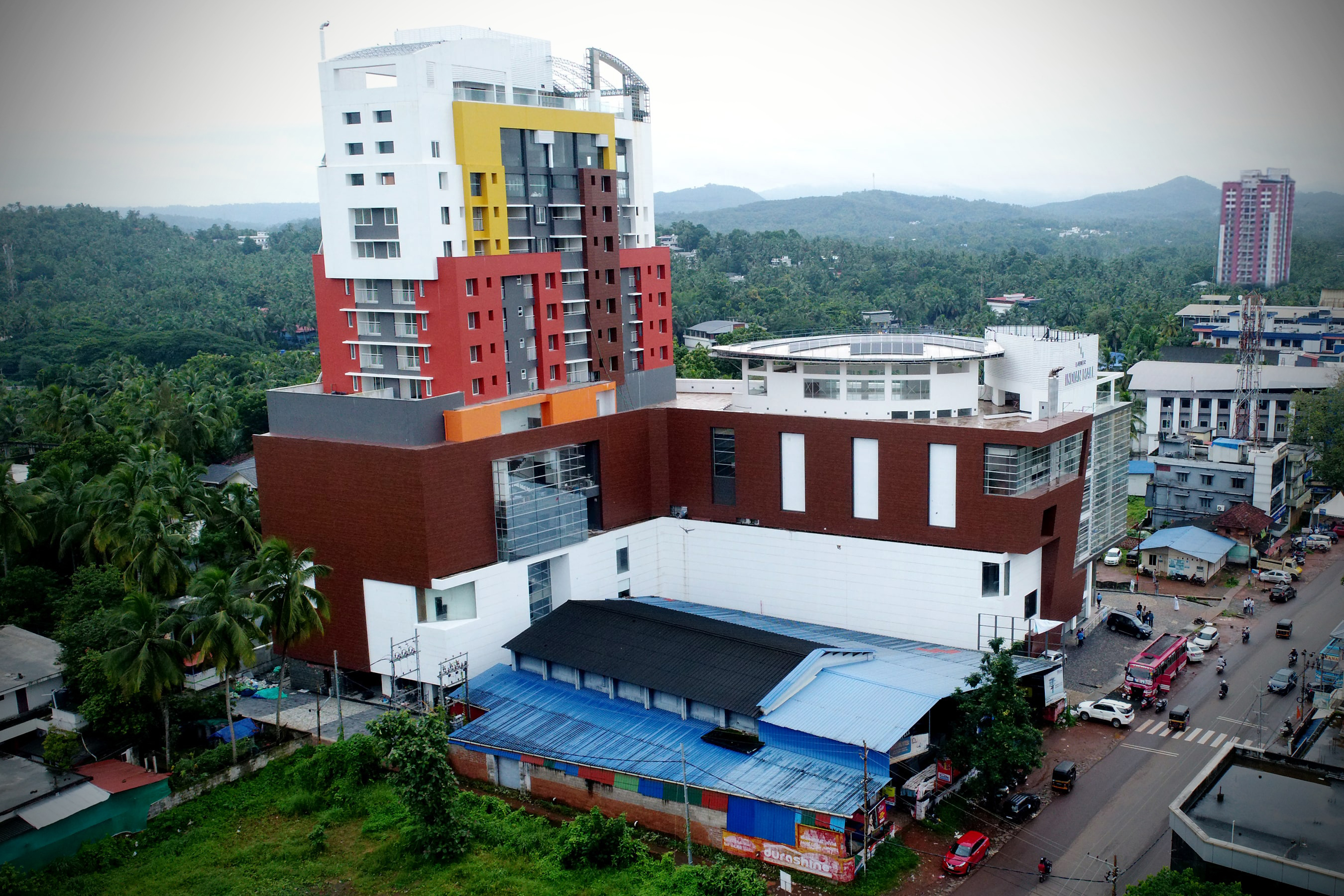
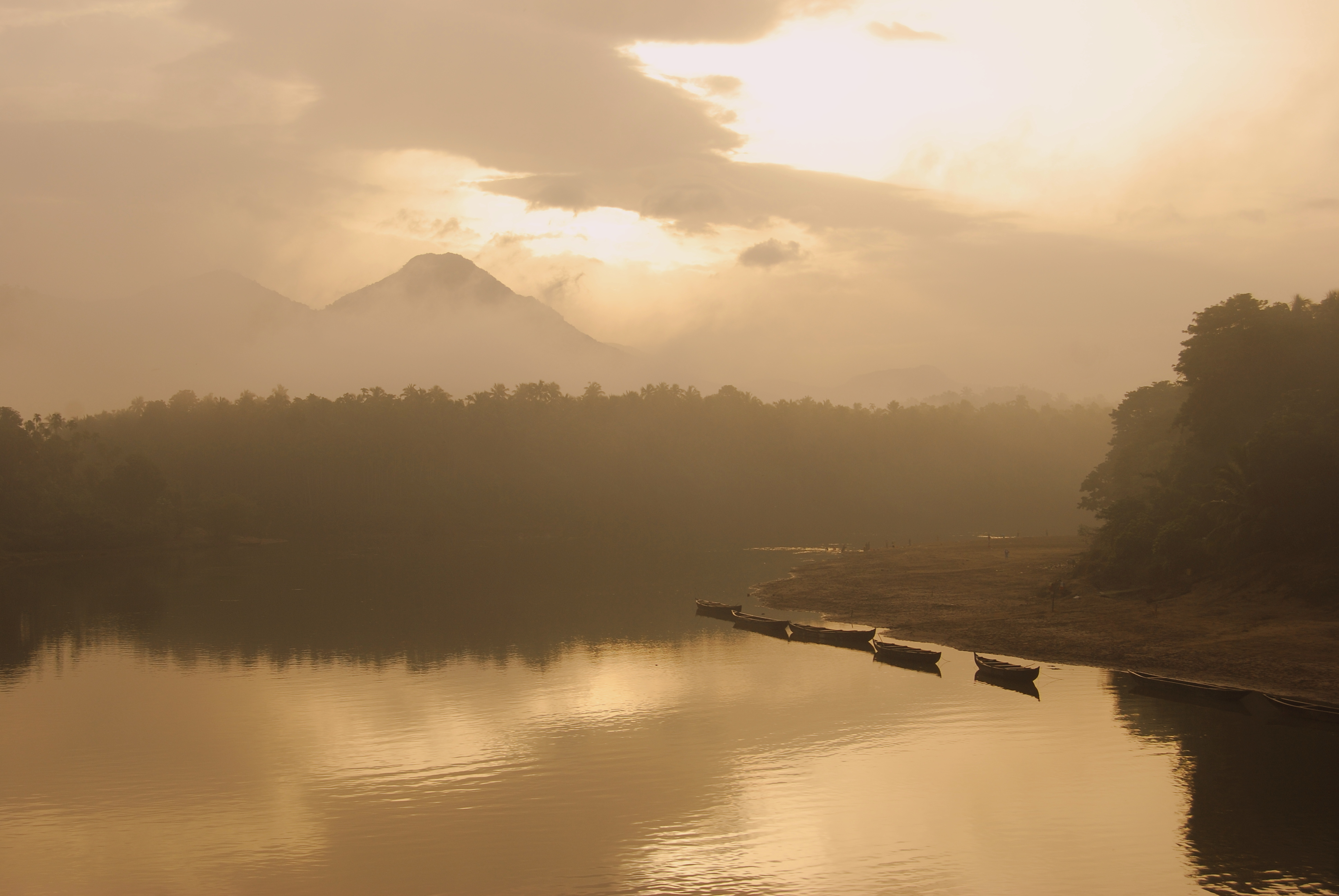
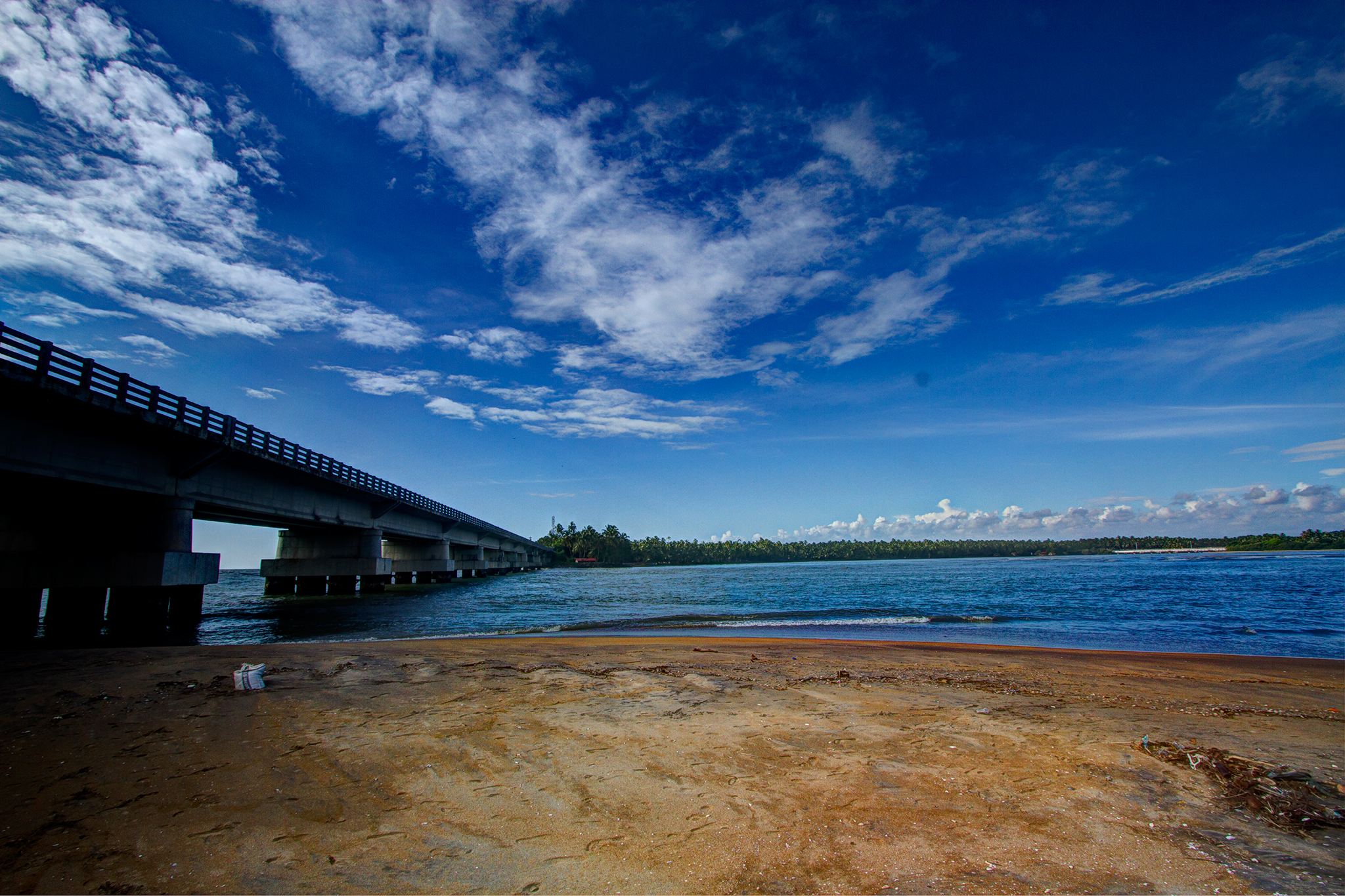
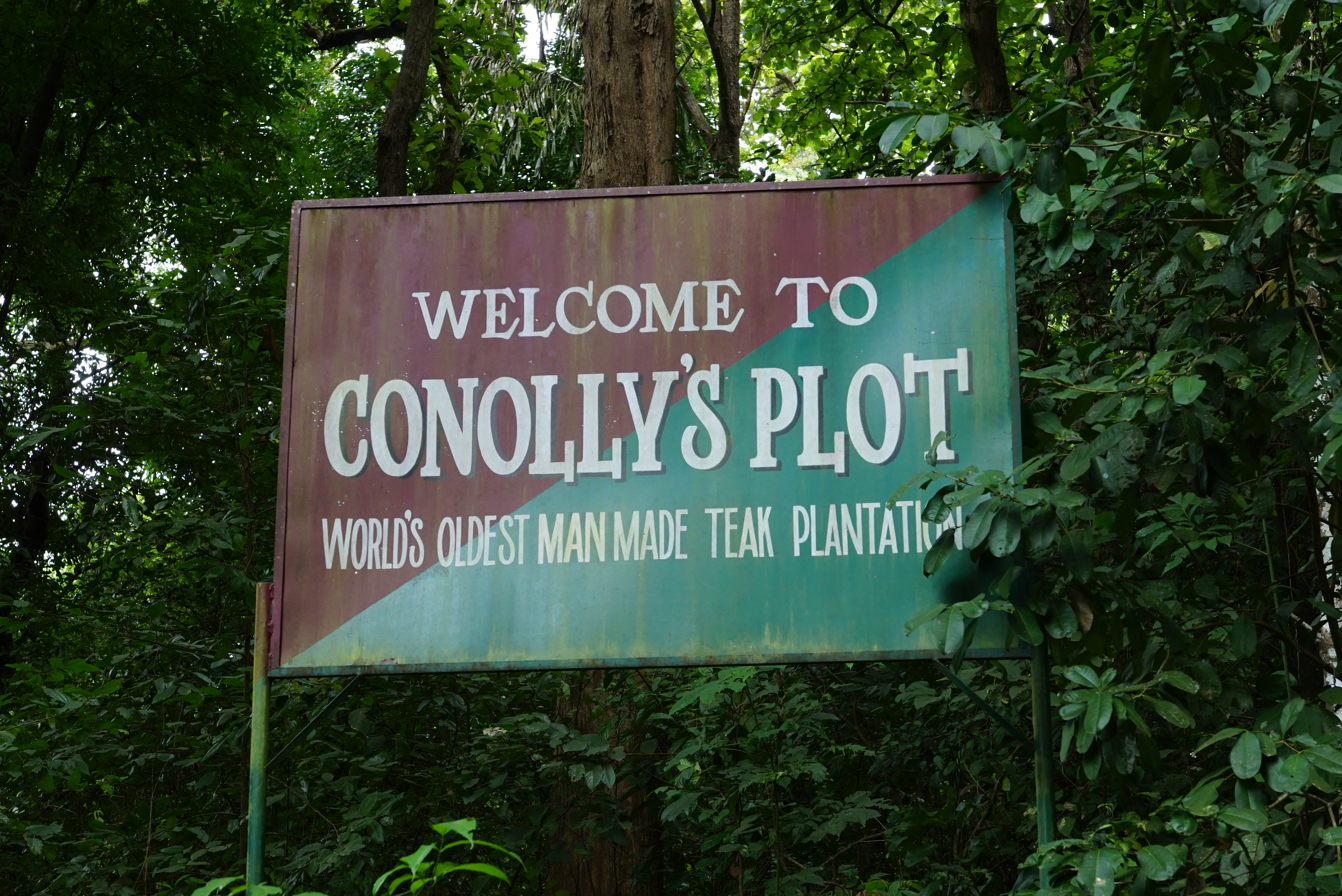
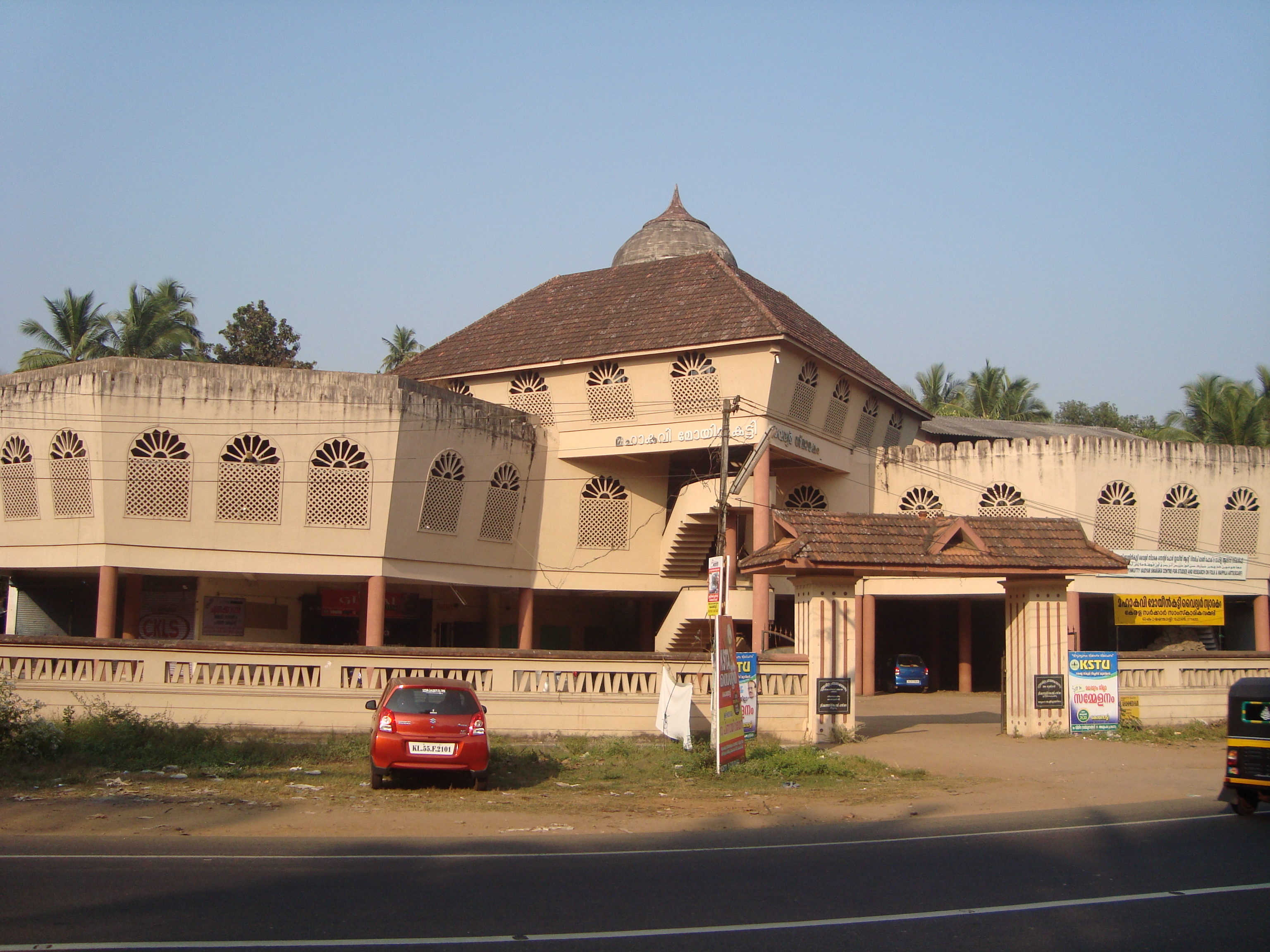
- Clockwise from top: Manjeri city, Chaliyar River at Areekode, Conolly's plot at Nilambur, Maha Kavi Moyinkutty Vaidyar Smarakam at Kondotty, Kadalundi River estuary at Vallikkunnu, Karuvarakundu

- Location in Kerala, India Eranad (India)
- Coordinates: 11.119198°N 76.119631°E
- Country: India
- State: Kerala
- District: Malappuram
- Taluk Headquarters: Manjeri

Languages
  - Official: Malayalam, English
- Time zone: UTC+5:30 (IST)
- Vehicle registration: KL-10, KL-71 & KL-84

Eranad (Malayalam: [eːrɐnaːɖə̆]) also known as Ernad refers to the erstwhile province in the midland area of Malabar, consisting of Malappuram and nearby regions such as Anakkayam, Manjeri, Kondotty, Nilambur, etc. Currently Eranad Taluk is a Taluk in Malappuram district. Eranad was ruled by a Samanthan Nair clan known as Eradis, Eradis related to the Vellodis of neighbouring Valluvanad and Nedungadis of Nedunganad. The rulers of Eranad were known by the title Eralppad/Eradi. They also used the title Thirumulpad.

Ernad had two capitals during various times, Nediyiruppu, in Kondotty under Chera rule, and Kottappadi, in Malappuram under Zamorin rule. Present-day Ernad taluk headquarters is at Manjeri. The Ernad Taluk under British Malabar District was the land between two rivers, Chaliyar and Kadalundi River. On west it was bound by the Nilgiri Mountains. It was the largest Taluk in Malabar District. It had included the whole of present-day Eranad Taluk, Nilambur Taluk, Kondotty Taluk, Tirurangadi Taluk, and two villages in Tirur Taluk (Kottakkal and Ponmala), and three villages in present-day Kozhikode Taluk, (Feroke, Ramanattukara, and Kadalundi).

== History ==
The Zamorin was actually known as Eradi (Ruler of Eranadu) before he shifted his headquarters from Nediyiruppu to Kozhikode.

The ancient port of Tyndis which was located on the northern side of Muziris, as mentioned in the Periplus of the Erythraean Sea, was somewhere around Eranadu. Its exact location is a matter of dispute. The suggested locations are Ponnani, Tanur, Beypore-Chaliyam-Kadalundi-Vallikkunnu, and Koyilandy. Note that all the above regions excluding Koyilandy are located in or around Eranadu. Tyndis was a major center of trade, next only to Muziris, between the Cheras and the Roman Empire. Pliny the Elder (1st century CE) states that the port of Tyndis was located at the northwestern border of Keprobotos (Chera dynasty). The North Malabar region, which lies north of the port at Tyndis, was ruled by the kingdom of Ezhimala during Sangam period. According to the Periplus of the Erythraean Sea, a region known as Limyrike began at Naura and Tyndis. However the Ptolemy mentions only Tyndis as the Limyrike's starting point. The region probably ended at Kanyakumari; it thus roughly corresponds to the present-day Malabar Coast. The value of Rome's annual trade with the region was estimated at around 50,000,000 sesterces. Pliny the Elder mentioned that Limyrike was prone by pirates. The Cosmas Indicopleustes mentioned that the Limyrike was a source of peppers.

Chaliyam in the northwestern end of Eranadu is also home to one of the oldest mosques in India. According to the Legend of Cheraman Perumals, the first Indian mosque was built in 624 AD at Kodungallur with the mandate of the last the ruler (the Cheraman Perumal) of Chera dynasty, who converted to Islam during the lifetime of Muhammad (c. 570–632). According to Qissat Shakarwati Farmad, the Masjids at Kodungallur, Kollam, Madayi, Barkur, Mangalore, Kasaragod, Kannur, Dharmadam, Panthalayini, and Chaliyam, were built during the era of Malik Dinar, and they are among the oldest Masjids in the Indian subcontinent. It is believed that Malik Dinar died at Thalangara in Kasaragod town.

Eranad (from "Erala-nadu", the Land of the Cattle, according to William Logan), was originally a province in the Chera Kingdom (9th-12th century CE) ruled by a clan known as the Eradis. Their provincial capital was at Nediyiruppu, near present-day Kondotty. The ruler of the Eralanadu was known as the Eralanadu Utaiyavar, Elar-thiri or Nediyiruppu Mooppan or Mooppil Nayar. Manavepala Manaviyan, a governor of the Eralanadu, signs himself in the famous Jewish Copper Plate (1000 CE). The Viraraghava Copper Plate (1225 CE) is also signed by the Eralanadu ruler.

After the fall of the Cheras, the region became an independent political entity. Later, the Eradis expanded their kingdom to the west and moved their capital to Calicut while setting up a regional capital at Kottappadi, Malappuram with Paranambi as the chieftain. The Eradis came to be known as the "Kings of the Oceans" (Samoothiri/Zamorin) in later times.

The Ernad taluk existed during British Colonial rule in India was under Malappuram Revenue Division, along with the neighbouring Valluvanad Taluk, a part of Malabar District within the Madras Presidency. The oldest teak plantation of the world at Nilambur, and the first tile-manufacturing industry of India at Feroke, were in Eranad.

In the first decade after Independence, large-scale changes in the territorial jurisdiction of this region took place with the formation of new taluks. On 1 January 1957 Tirur Taluk was formed, by absorbing portions of Eranad and Ponnani taluks. Three more taluks, namely Tirurangadi taluk and Nilambur taluk, and Kondotty Taluk, were formed later by bifurcating Tirur Taluk and Eranad taluk.

== Geography ==
William Logan, the author of Malabar Manual and a former District Collector of Malabar, described Eranad as the most typical Taluk of erstwhile Malabar District, having many smaller hills, valleys, Conolly Canal, long rivers and their tributaries (Chaliyar and Kadalundi River), various plantations, paddy fields etc. The highest peaks in the erstwhile Malabar District was located in Nilambur region of Eranad (Eastern Eranad) on the vicinity of Nilgiri Mountains. The 2,554 m high Mukurthi peak, which is situated in the border of modern-day Nilambur Taluk and Ooty Taluk, and is also the fifth-highest peak in South India as well as the third-highest in Kerala after Anamudi (2,696 m) and Meesapulimala (2,651 m), was the highest point of elevation in Malabar district. It is also the highest peak in Kerala outside the Idukki district. The 2,383 high Anginda peak, which is located closer to Malappuram-Palakkad-Nilgiris district border is the second-highest peak. Vavul Mala, a 2,339 m high peak situated on the trijunction of Nilambur Taluk of Malappuram, Wayanad, and Thamarassery Taluk of Kozhikode districts, was the third-highest point of elevation in the district. Apart from the main continuous range of Western Ghats, there were many small undulating hills in the lowland of the district.

In the British records, Eastern Eranad region was collectively described as Nilambur Valley. The bank of river Chaliyar at Nilambur region is also known for natural Gold fields. Explorations done at the valley of the river Chaliyar in Nilambur has shown reserves of the order of 2.5 million cubic meters of placers with 0.1 gram per cubic meter of gold. Eranad is blessed with several tributaries of Chaliyar river and Kadalundi river.

== Malabar Rebellion ==
The region was the centre of the Malabar Rebellion of 1921. This armed uprising against British and feudal lords was put down by the Colonial government.

== Eranad Taluk under British Rule ==
Eranad Taluk in the erstwhile Malabar District

The Amsoms included in Ernad Taluk was classified into four divisions- Parappur (Southern Parappanad), Ramanad, Cheranad, and Eranad. There were 52 Amsoms in the Taluk. (A part of Cheranad division was under Ponnani Taluk). The British Eranad Taluk was created in 1860-61by merging the erstwhile British Taluks of Southern Parappanad, Ramanad, Cheranad, and Eranad, which were vested between River Chaliyar and Kadalundi River.

1. Parappur (Southern Parappanad)

Southern Parappanad was a vassal of the Zamorin of Calicut. Parappanangadi, the headquarters of Parappanad royal family, was at Southern Parappanad. It consisted of the following 7 Amsoms:

- Pazhanchannur
- Mannur
- Tenhipalam
- Neduva
- Vallikunnu
- Parappanangadi
- Nannambra

2. Ramanad

Ramanad was directly ruled by the Zamorin of Calicut. It consisted of the following 7 Amsoms:

- Nallur
- Azhinjilam
- Cherukavu
- Karad
- Karumarakkad
- Karippur
- Chelembra

3. Cheranad

Cheranad was also directly ruled by the Zamorin of Calicut. Cheranad was scattered in Eranad and Ponnani Taluks. The headquarters of Cheranad was Tirurangadi. It consisted of the following 17 Amsoms:

Eranad Taluk

- Olakara
- Trikkulam
- Koduvayur
- Vengara
- Kannamangalam
- Oorakam-Melmuri
- Puthur
- Kottakkal
- Indiannur
- Valakkulam
- Vadakkumpuram

Ponnani Taluk

- Valiyakunnu
- Kattipparuthi
- Athavanad
- Ummathoor
- Irimbiliyam
- Parudur

4. Eranad

Eranad was the original headquarters of the Zamorin of Calicut. It was later changed to Kozhikode with the conquest of Polanad. It also was under the direct rule of the Zamorin. It consisted of the following 26 Amsoms:

- Mappram
- Cheekkode
- Urangattiri
- Mampad
- Nilambur
- Porur
- Wandoor
- Thiruvali
- Trikkalangode
- Karakunnu
- Iruvetti
- Kavanoor
- Chengara
- Puliyakode
- Kuzhimanna
- Kolathur
- Nediyiruppu
- Keezhmuri
- Melmuri
- Arimbra
- Valluvambram
- Irumbuzhi
- Manjeri
- Payyanad
- Elankur
- Ponmala

== Transport ==
The Ernad area connects with other parts of India through highway NH966. Multiple state highways connect the region with other parts of the district as well as the rest of the state. The nearest airport is at Karipur. The nearest major railway station is at Tirur, which is also the oldest railway station in the state of Kerala.

== See also ==
- Eranad Taluk
- Zamorin
- Kozhikode
