= Valenchery =

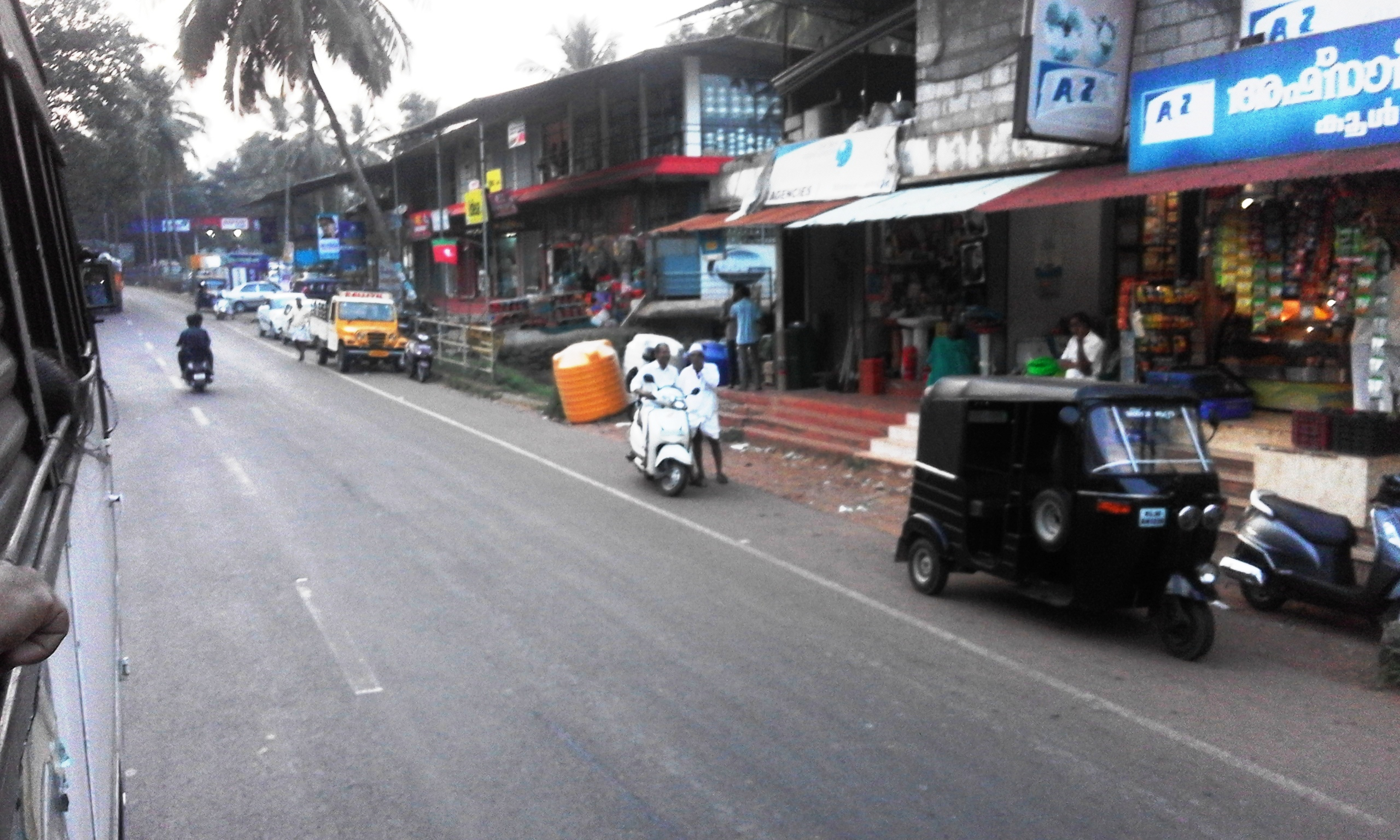
- Morayur - Valenchery
- Nickname: Town
- Location within Kerala
- Coordinates: 11.1358000°N 76.022200°E
- Country: India
- State: Kerala
- District: Malappuram District
- Lok Sabhaconstituency: Malappuram (Lok Sabha constituency)
- R D O: Tirur RDO(Revenue Divisions of Kerala)
- Tehsil: Kondotty Taluk
- Village: Morayur
- PIN: 673642
- Telephone code: 0483
- Website: 12

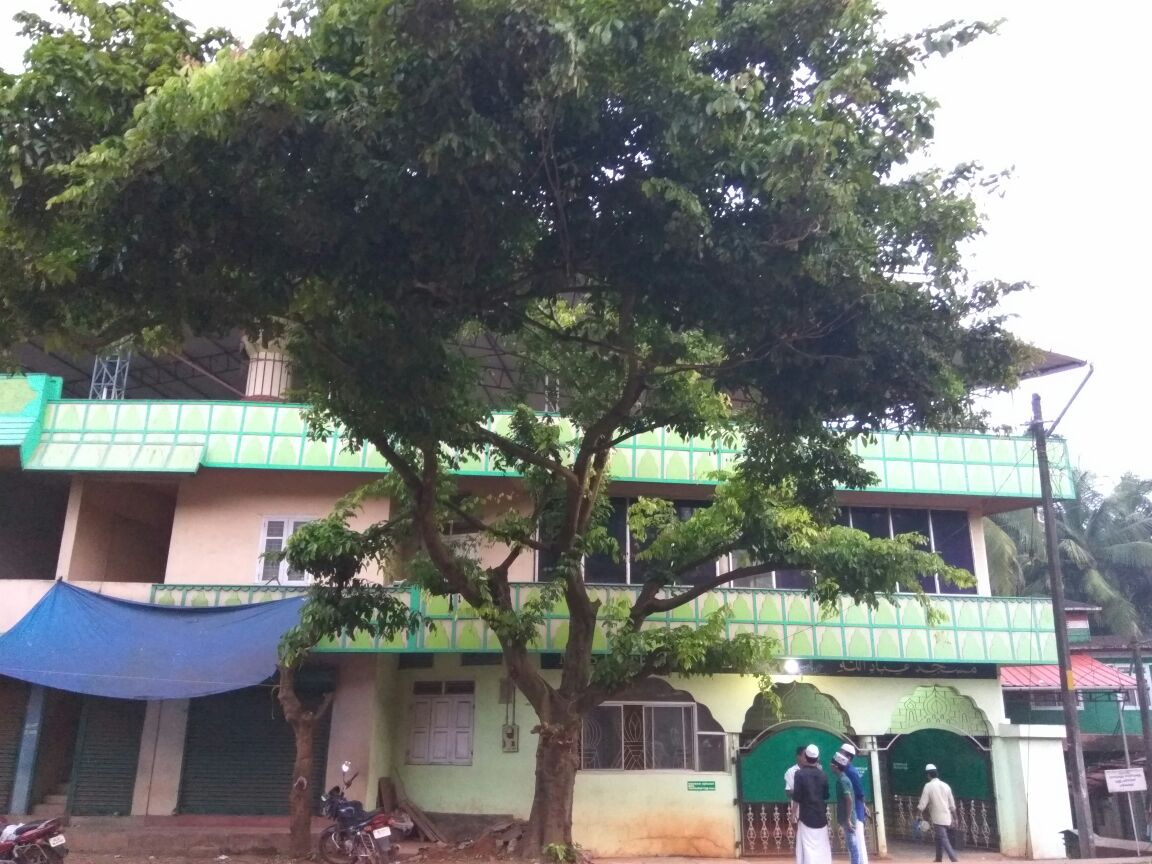
Valenchery Town Juma Masjid

Valenchery is a town in Morayur Gram panchayat in Malappuram (Lok Sabha constituency) in Malappuram district of state of Kerala. Valenchery is divided into four Areas, they are Village Road, Colony Road, Madrasa Road and Hilltop Area.Four Wards from Morayur Panchayath partly belongs to Valenchery (Keezhmuri-04, Parakkal-12, Valenchery-13, Thiruvaliparamba-14). Nearest places are Valluvambram Junction, Mongam, Morayur, Arimbra and Pookkottur. Nearest tourist spot is Mini Ooty.

== History ==
From 1792 to 1957 Valenchery was part of Malabar District of the Madras Presidency. From 1961 became part of Malappuram District The history of Morayur has connection with Zamorin Kingdom of Kozhikode. Thinayancherry Elayath was one of the ministers of Zamorin king and he was a native to the place in which he was the family head of mongambulath family of landlords. One Muslim family named 'Kodithodika' was the major family from the earlier history of morayur. At the time of British ruling, it was a common practice to appoint 'Adhikaries' (present day Village Officer) from the major families of the place with inheritance right, so the post was with Kodithodika Family in morayur and it continued after the Independence up to year 1961 when village Reunion ed. The Kodithodika Muhammed Adhikari was the successor of Kodithodika Ahammed Kutty Haji and was the last of his kind, up to year 1970 he was the Adhikari of morayur village. The first Gram panchayat elected President was Kodithodika Ahmed alias Bappu in year 1969 and he continued up-to year 1995. The history of Morayur has connection with The Malabar rebellion.

== Educational Institutions ==
- V.H.M.H.S.S. Morayur, Morayur
- G.L.P.S Morayur, Valenchery.
- NIT English School, Valenchery

== Landmarks ==
- Valenchery Masjid Ibadillahi (Valenchery Mahallu )
- Morayur Village Office
- Morayur Shiva Temple

== Demographics ==
As of 2001 India census, Morayur had a population of 29369 with 14644 males and 14725 females.

== Culture ==
Morayur village is as predominantly Muslim populated area. Hindus are exist in comparatively smaller numbers. So the culture of the locality is based upon Muslim traditions. Duff Muttu, Kolkali and Aravanamuttu are common folk arts of this locality. There are many libraries attached to mosques giving a rich source of Islamic studies. Some of the books are written in Arabi-Malayalam which is a version of the Malayalam language written in Arabic script. People gather in mosques for the evening prayer and continue to sit there after the prayers discussing social and cultural issues. Business and family issues are also sorted out during these evening meetings. The Hindu minority of this area keeps their rich traditions by celebrating various festivals in their temples. Hindu rituals are done here with a regular devotion like other parts of Kerala.

== Transportation ==
National Highway 966 (India)(previously NH213) passes through Valenchery. Valenchery is between Mongam and Morayur Towns. Nearest cities are Kondotty(7km), Manjeri(12km), Malappuram(14km), Perinthalmanna(34km), Nilambur(38km), Tirur(38km) and Kozhikode(35km). Nearest Bus Stands connecting to cities are Kondotty, Areacode, Manjeri, Malappuram, Nilambur, Perinthalmanna, Kotakkal, Kozhikode and Palakkad. Nearest Railway stations are Feroke, Kozhikode, Angadippuram, Tirur and Palakkad. Nearest Airports are Calicut International Airport(11km), Cochin International Airport(145km), Coimbatore Airport(159km), Mangalore Airport(277km), Kempegowda International Airport Bangalore(381km) and Trivandrum Airport(374km). Nearest Seaports Beypore, Kozhikode, Ponnani and Kochi Port(179km)
