= Kodithodika family =

CTP (Chetyiyarammal thanduparakkal) family were a big family.

== History ==
Kodithodika Family was a prominent landowning Muslim family in the early history of Morayur. lineage of the family goes to descendants of Kunhali Marakkar IV who were expelled to Ponnani by the Portuguese when they captured and executed him with the help of the Zamorins in 1600.(citation required). The first man who found the Family after settling at Cheruputhoor, a place near to Morayur and Mongam, was Evren with his brother Ali. Evren lived at a property called Kodithodi and his descendants were later known by that name. Ali's descendants were known as the Kurungadans because he (Ali) lived at a nearby property called Kurunkattil. Both Kodithodi and Kurunkattil properties exist even today though they were rebuilt many times since. The family expanded further to Morayur, Kondotty, Amayoor, Arimbra, kuruppath

At the British Raj rule, it was common practice to appoint 'Adhikaries' from major families with inheritance rights especially land, thus the post was held by the Kodithodika family in Morayur. They continued to hold the post after Independence (1947) up to 1961. The first president of the Gram panchayat was Kodithodika 'Bappu' Ahmed, who served from 1969 to 1995.
