= Arimbra Bapu =

Arimbra Bappu
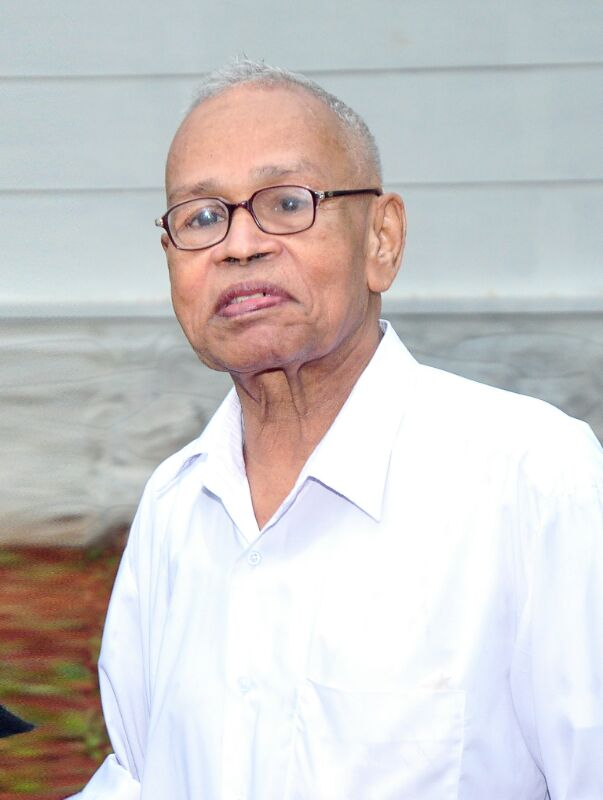

Personal details
- Born: 1 May 1936 Arimbra, Morayur, British India
- Died: 4 July 2014 (aged 78) Arimbra, Morayur, Malappuram Kerala, India
- Party: Indian Union Muslim League
- Spouse: Ummu Ayshumma
- Children: 2 sons (Abdulatheef and Shamsuhheen) and 2 daughters (Suhra and Haseena)

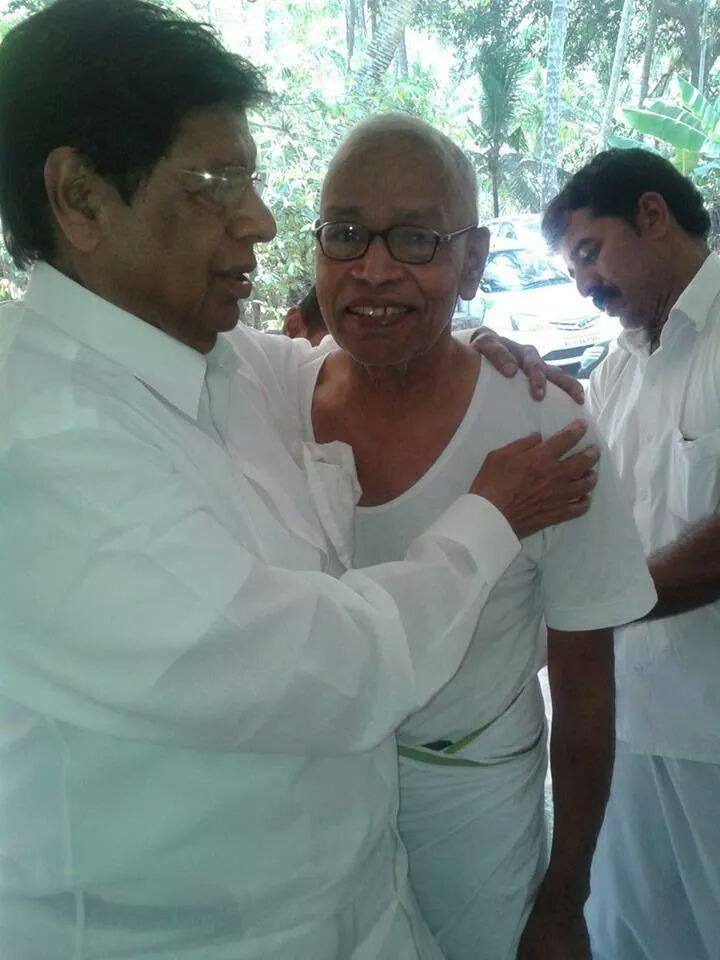
Arimbra Bappu with MP Sri. E. Ahamed

Kodithodi Ahamed alias Bappu (1 May 1936 – 4 July 2014) popularly known as Arimbra Bappu or Bappu was an Indian Union Muslim League (IUML) politician from the state of Kerala, India. He was the first president of Morayur Gram panchayat from 1969 to 1995, as he was elected continuously, sometimes without opposition. He avoided politics after he had a brain stroke, up to the second stroke, which caused his death on 4 July 2014. Several times the party called on him to be the state minister and MLA; he rejected the opportunities. He worked with many well known politicians of the IUML, such as C. H. Mohammed Koya and Chakeri Ahammed Kutty), and with the Panakkad Thangal. He was instrumental in raising party membership in Eranad. He served many capacities in the party and the government.
