= Konikkallu =

Konikkallu is a village in Anakkayam Panchayat, Eranad Taluk, Malappuram district, Kerala state, India.

== Location ==
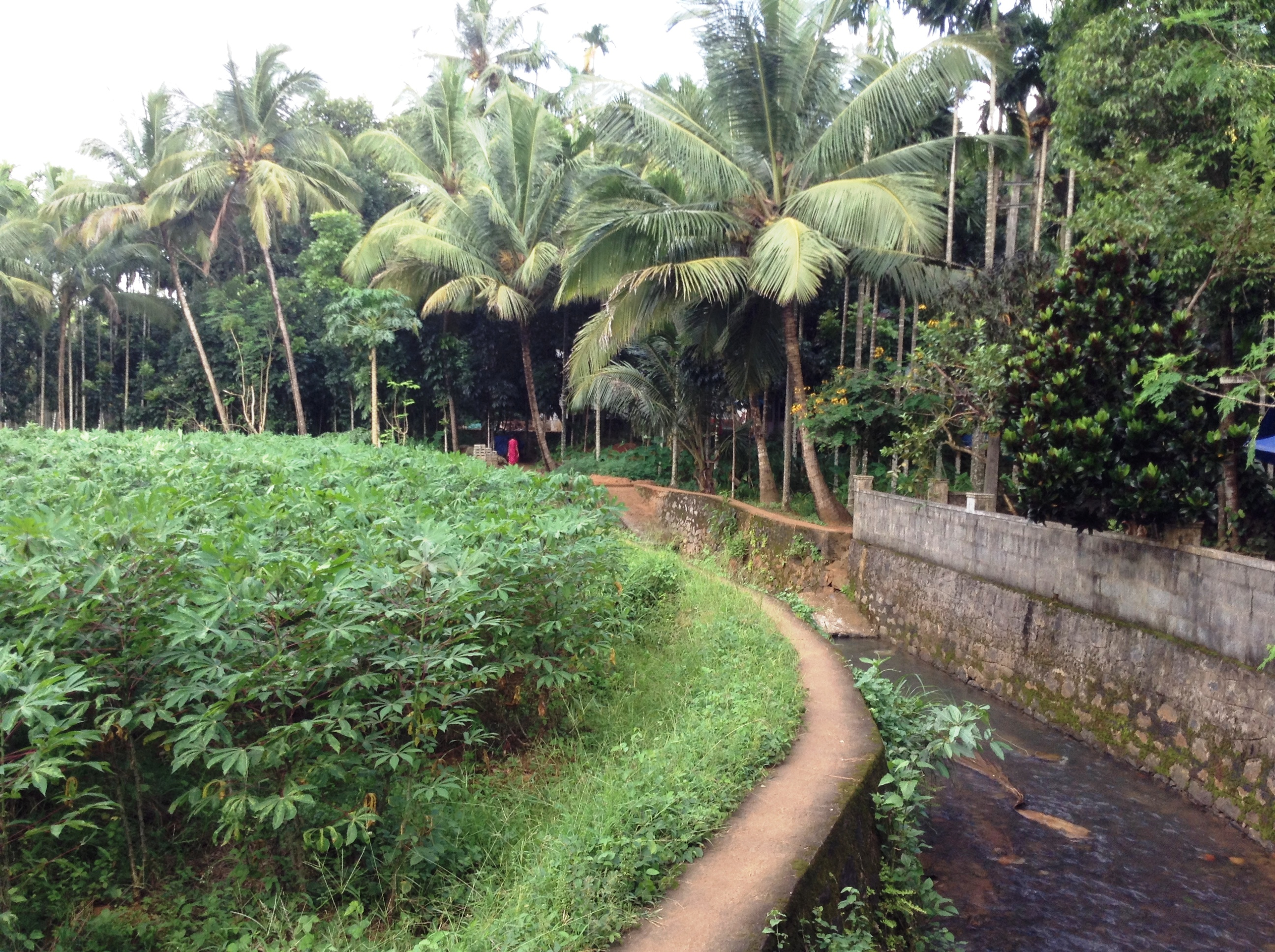
Konikkallu

Konikkallu is about 5 km away from Manjeri and near to Pappinippara. Konikkallu is a small village area, with agriculture the predominant means for livelihood. Valavu bus stop in the Manjeri-pokoottoor road is the main bus stop. A small bus route operates between Manjeri and Malappuram via Valavu- Vadekkemuri-Anakkayam pass through Konnikkallu.

The hamlet is predominantly occupied by people from the Muslim community, intermingled with a small Hindu population.

== Culture ==
Konikkallu village is a predominantly Muslim populated area. Hindus exist in comparatively smaller numbers. So the culture of the locality is based upon Muslim traditions. Duff Muttu, Kolkali and Aravanamuttu are common folk arts of this locality. There are many libraries attached to mosques giving a rich source of Islamic studies. Most of the books are written in Arabi-Malayalam which is a version of the Malayalam language written in Arabic script. People gather in mosques for the evening prayer and continue to sit there after the prayers discussing social and cultural issues. Business and family issues are also sorted out during these evening meetings. The Hindu minority of this area keeps their rich traditions by celebrating various festivals in their temples. Hindu rituals are done here with a regular devotion like other parts of Kerala.

== Transportation ==
Konikkallu village connects to other parts of India through Manjeri town. National highway No.66 passes through Parappanangadi and the northern stretch connects to Goa and Mumbai. The southern stretch connects to Cochin and Trivandrum. National Highway No.966 connects to Palakkad and Coimbatore. The nearest airport is at Kozhikode. The nearest major railway station is at Tirur.
