= Bapu =

Bapu is a word for "father" in many Indian languages such as Gujarati and Marathi, and may refer to:

- Mahatma Gandhi (1869–1948), endeared as Bapu
  - Bapu (book), 1949 autobiography by F. Mary Barr, detailing her interactions with Gandhi
- Bapu Gokhale (1777–1818), general during the Third Anglo-Maratha War
- Bapu Joshi (1912–1994), Indian cricket umpire
- Bapu Nadkarni (1933–2020), Indian cricketer
- Bapu (director) (1933–2014), painter, cartoonist, film director from Andhra Pradesh, India
- Arimbra Bapu (1936–2014), Indian politician from Kerala
- Asaram (born 1941), also known as Asaram Bapu, Indian spiritual teacher
- Morari Bapu (born 1946), Hindu religious figure
- Bapu Hari Chaure (born 1949), Indian politician
- Ngawang Tashi Bapu (born 1968), Singing Monk who was nominated for a Grammy Award in 2006
- Bapu, fictional character in the 2006 Indian film Khosla Ka Ghosla, played by Navin Nischol
