= Nediyiruppu =

- Suburb of Kondotty
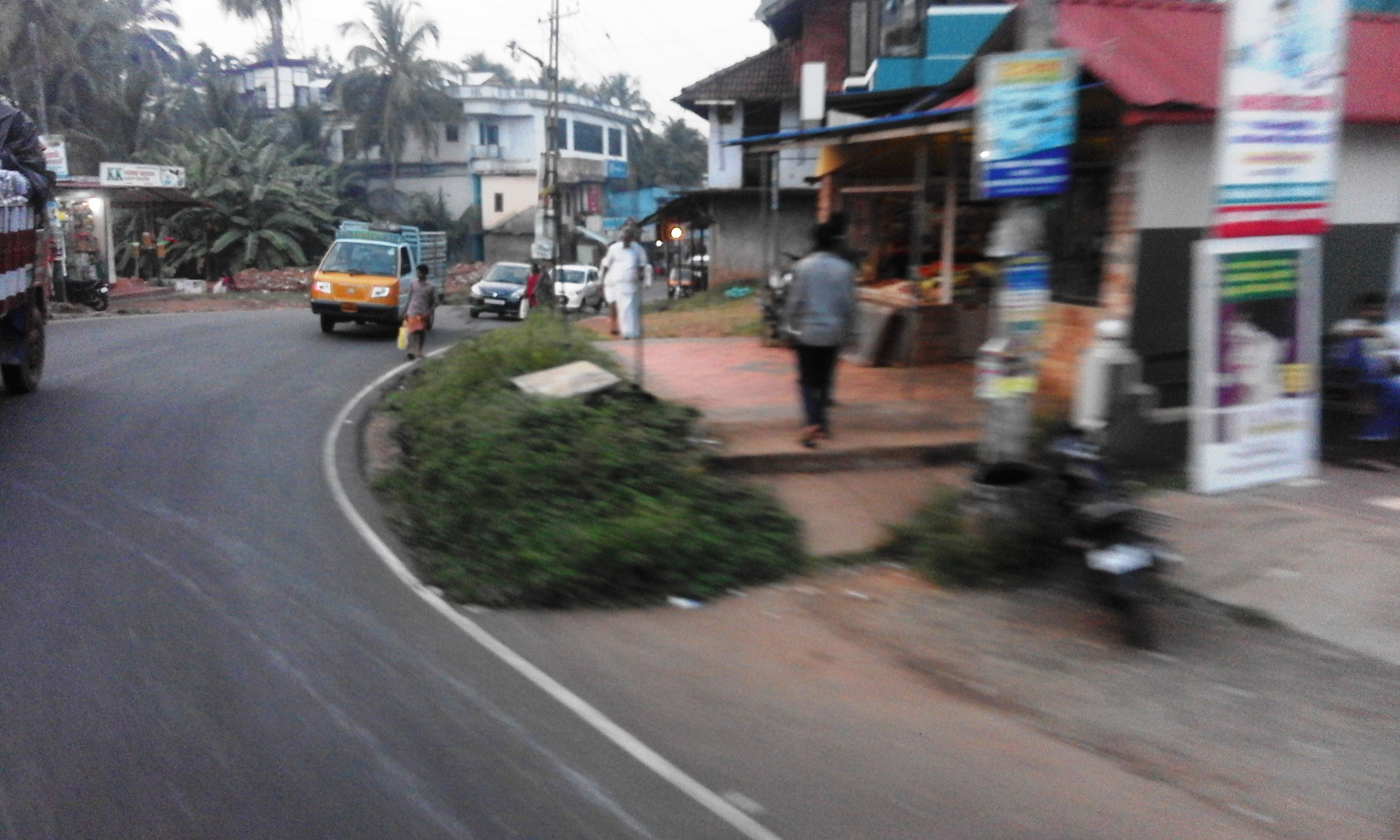
- Musliyarangadi Town, Nediyiruppu

- Location in Kerala, India Nediyiruppu (India)
- Coordinates: 11.1297078°N 76.0021198°E
- Country: India
- State: Kerala
- District: Malappuram

Population (2011)
  - Total: 30,462

Languages
  - Official: Malayalam
- Time zone: UTC+5:30 (IST)
- Vehicle registration: KL-84

Nediyiruppu was the capital of the Zamorin's kingdom in colonial Kerala. At the time, it was known as Nediyiruppu Swaroopam. It is a region of the Kondotty municipality in Malappuram district, Kerala, India. It is situated 24 kilometres (15 mi) from Malappuram, the district headquarters.

== History ==
Nediyiruppu was the headquarters of the Zamorin rulers of the Kingdom of Calicut (the kingdom was called Nediyiruppu Swaroopam at that time).

According to some other historians, the wealth of Manavikrama royalty was kept in a treasury at Nediyiruppu named Nedi-Iruppu meaning "got-and-placed". The treasury was located in Viruthiyil Paramba in Nediyiruppu.

Nediyiruppu village is a part of the Kondotty municipality.

== Demographics ==
As of 2011 India census, Nediyiruppu had a population of 30,462 with 14,859 males and 15,603 females. In 2015, Nediyiruppu Grama Panchayath and Kondotty Grama Panchayath merged to form a new Kondotty municipality.

Most residents of this village are farmers, while others work in Persian Gulf countries. The village receives remittances from workers in the Persian Gulf region.

The biggest Harijan colony in the state of Kerala is located in Nediyiruppu village, on a hillock called Colony Road.

== Administration ==
Nediyiruppu village merged with the Kondotty municipality in 2015. It is now part of the municipality.

== Suburbs and villages ==
- Important places in Nediyiruppu Village include Musliarangadi, Nediyiruppu (formerly Colony Road Junction),Kottukara, Meleparambu, Chirayil Chungam, Kodangad, and Kurupath. Historically, Nediyiruppu is significant as the capital of the Zamorin dynasty. In remembrance of this heritage, Nediyiruppu Swaroopam Road in Poyilikkave was named to honor its historical importance.
- Mongam and Moayur are two villages lying between the towns of Musliyarangadi and Valluvambram. Morayur, in Malayalam, means "land of peoples who have manners". Thinayancherry Elayath, a native of Morayur, was a minister of one of the Zamorin kings. Anwarul Islam Women's Arabic College is an Arabic college located in Mongam and is affiliated to the University of Calicut.
- At Valluvambram Junction the road from Kozhikode meets Manjeri Road and Malappuram Road. Manjeri Road goes to Nilambur, Ooty, and Mysore. Malappuram Road goes to Guruvayur and Thrissur. Despite the importance of the junction, the village of Valluvambram remains very rural, except for some large commercial developments on the sides of the main roads.
- Other suburbs are Kodangad, Kuruppath, Pothuvettypara, Kottukkara, Mongam, Morayur, Arimbra Hills, Millumpady, Iruveengal, Colony Road, Ozhukur, Thurakkal, Kolathur, and Thalekkara.

== Transportation ==
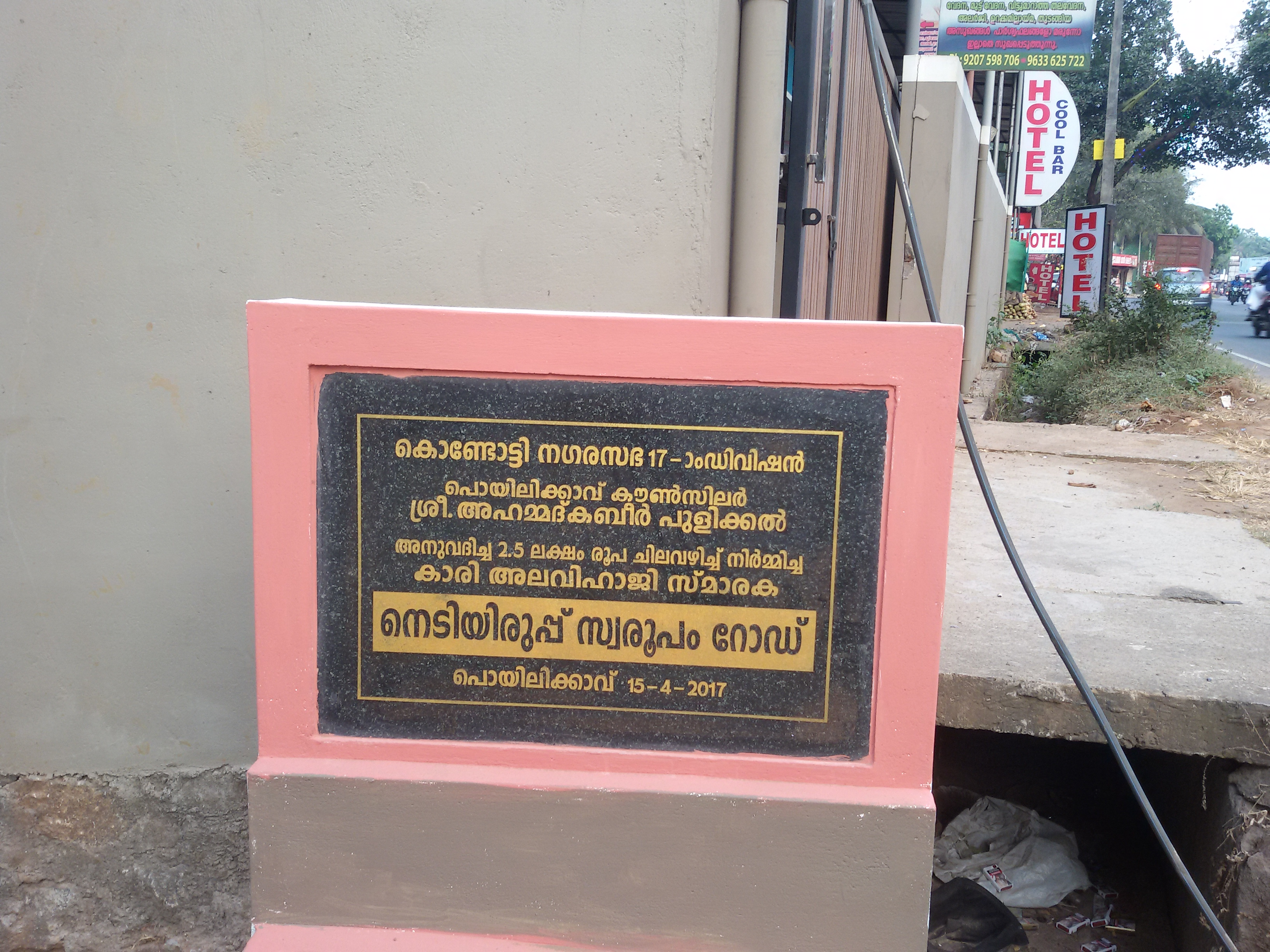
Nediyiruppu Swaroopam Road at Poyilikkave in Nediyiruppu

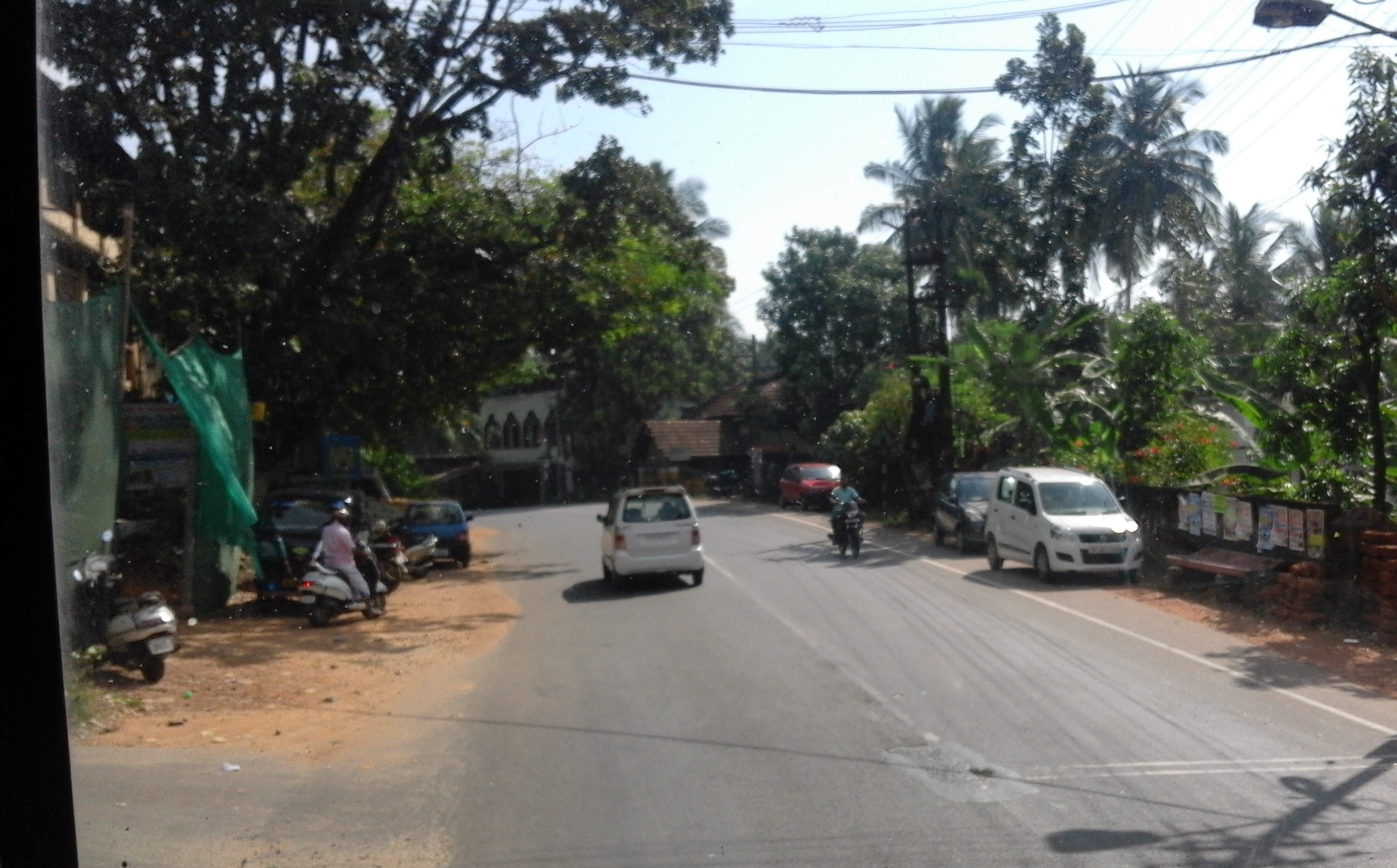
Upper Musliyarangadi

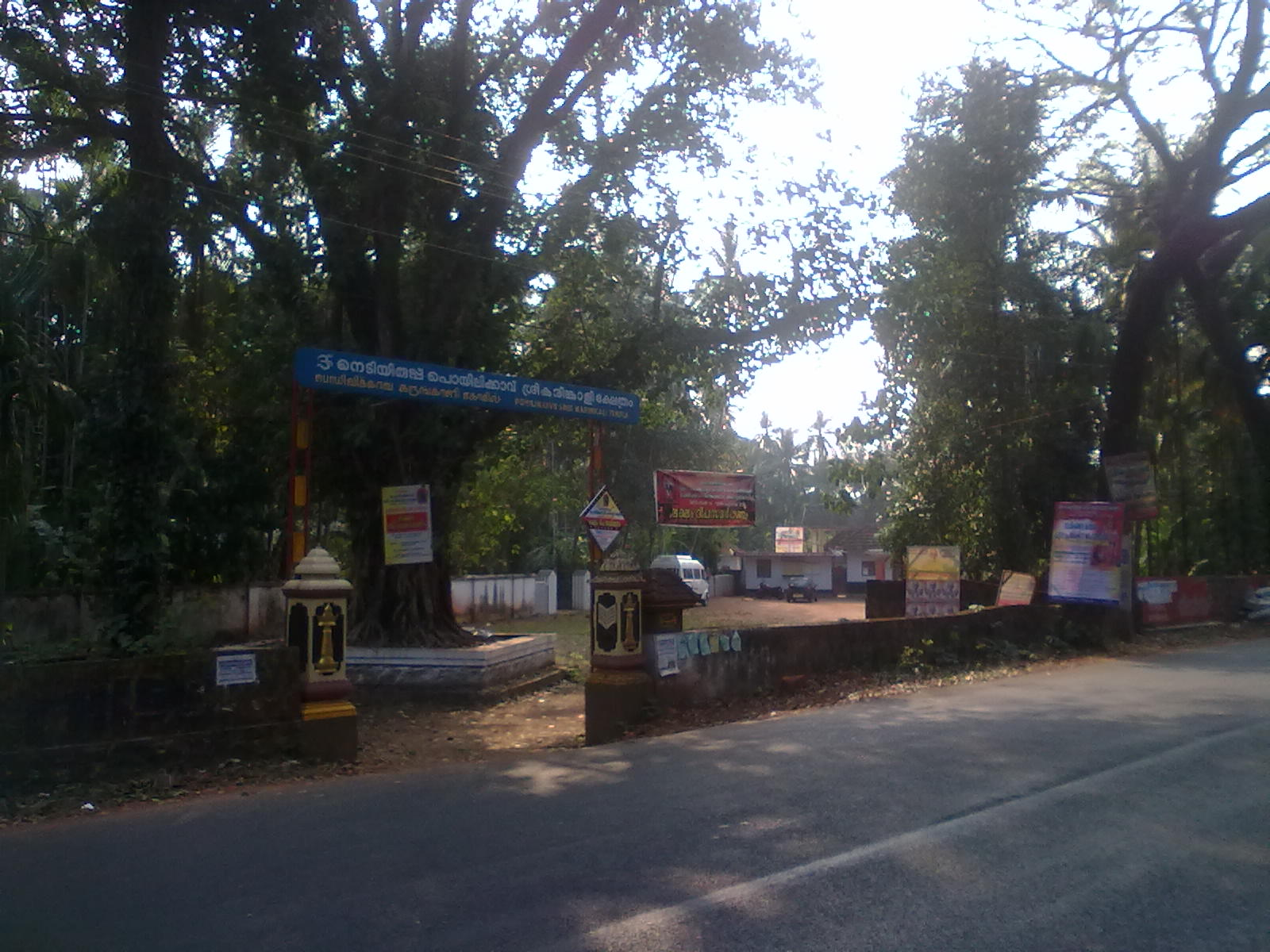
Poyilikkavu Karinkali Temple, Nediyiruppu

Nediyiruppu village connects to other parts of India through Feroke town on the west and Nilambur town on the east. National Highway 66 passes through Musliyarangadi, connecting to Goa and Mumbai, to the north, and to Cochin and Trivandrum, to the south. State Highway 28 starts at Nilambur and connects to Ooty, Mysore, and Bangalore through state highways 12, 29, and 181.

The nearest major railway station is at Feroke. The nearest airport is at Kozhikode.

== Economy ==
The main income of the village is from remittances from Persian Gulf countries like Saudi Arabia. A large number of the locals also work in the agrarian sector. Small industries like hollow bricks, wood cutting, granite quarries, and matchbox units exist in the village. The only available petrol bunker is located at Kurupath Junction.

== Culture ==
Nediyiruppu village has six temples, 20 mosques, and 21 Madrassas. It is a predominantly Muslim area, with Hindus in comparatively smaller numbers, so the culture of the locality is based upon Muslim traditions.

People gather in mosques for evening prayer and continue to sit there after the prayers, discussing social and cultural issues. Business and family issues are also sorted out during these evening meetings. There are many libraries attached to mosques that are a rich source of Islamic studies. Some of the books are written in Arabi-Malayalam which is a version of the Malayalam language written in Arabic script.

Duff Muttu, Kolkali, and Aravanamuttu are common folk arts of this locality.

The Hindu minority maintains their traditions by celebrating various festivals in their temples. Hindu rituals are performed here with a regular devotion, as in other parts of Kerala.

== Notable landmarks ==
- Poyilikkave Karinkali Temple is an ancient temple in Nediyiruppu that was constructed during Zamorins period. The capital of the Zamorins was at Nediyiruppu Swaroopam, which made this temple important. The Thalapoli festival worshipping Goddess Karinkali Devi is held in December of every year.
- Pandikashala Mosque in Musliyarangadi is the biggest mosque in the village. The mosque has intricate carvings of verses from the Quran on doors and windows. There is one Dargah of a holy man in this mosque.
- Thiruvonamala Temple, near Harijan Colony Road.
- Chirayil Chungath Jumaeth Palli, 400 years old, with a 250-year-old carved Mimbre.
- Ayyappa Temple, Chirayil.

== Mini Ooty Hills ==
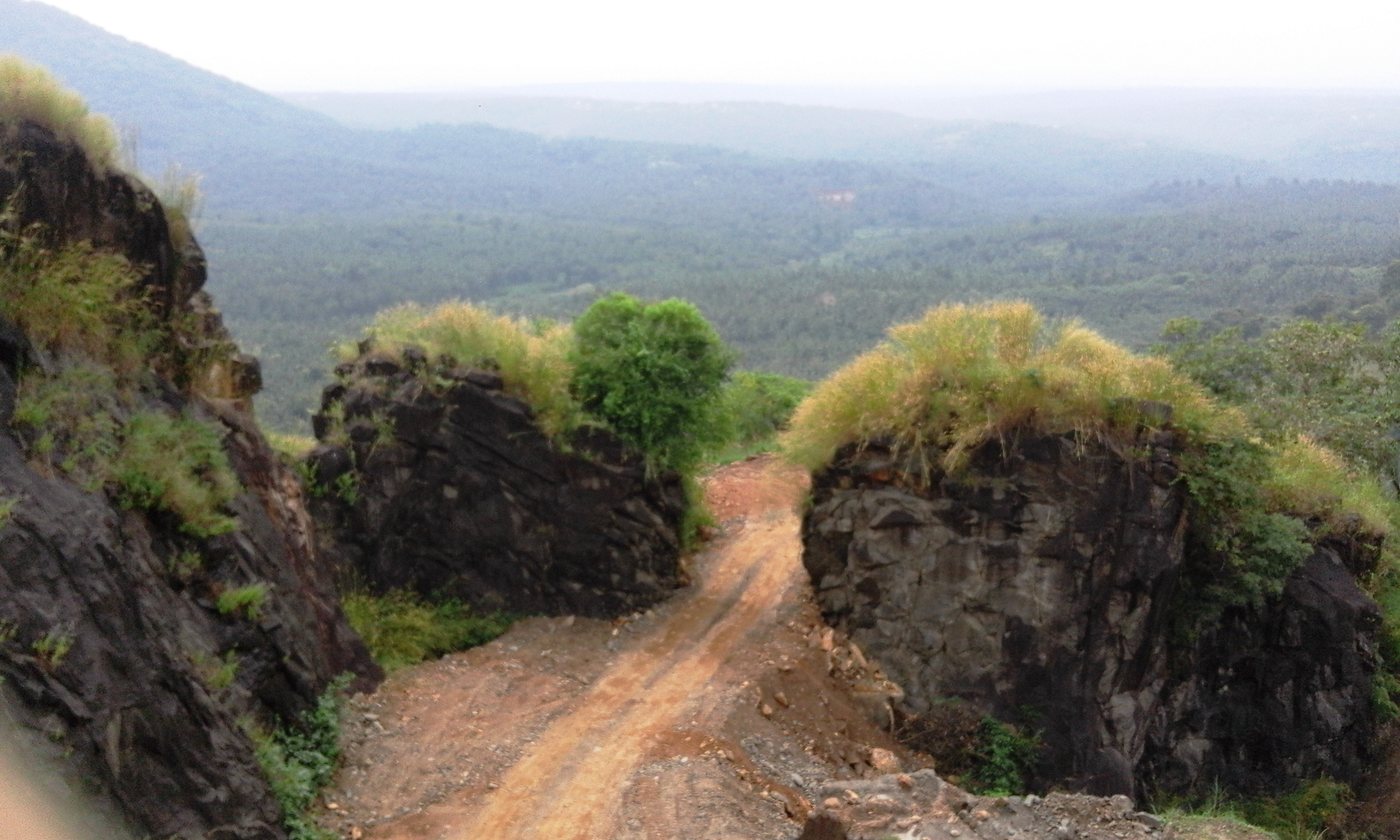

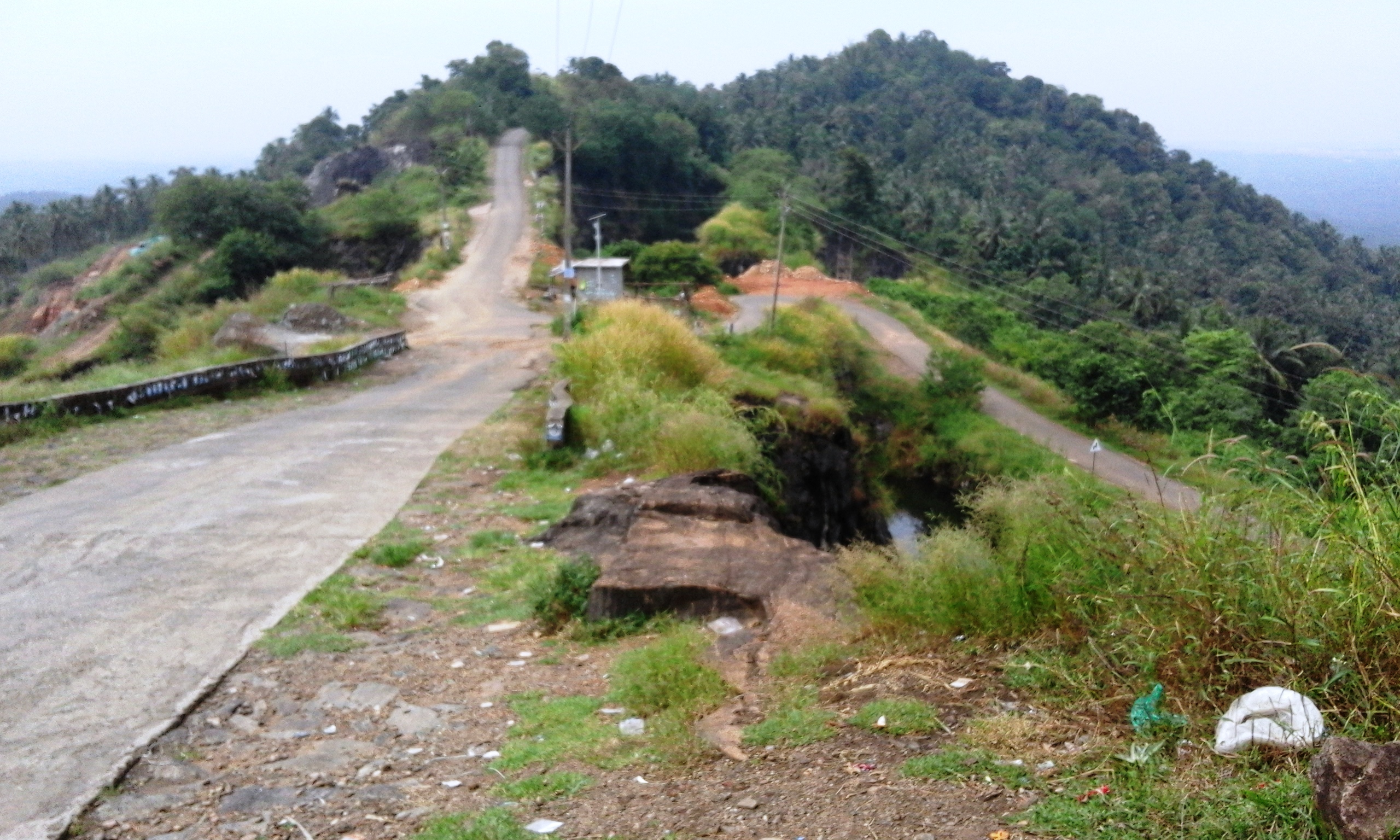

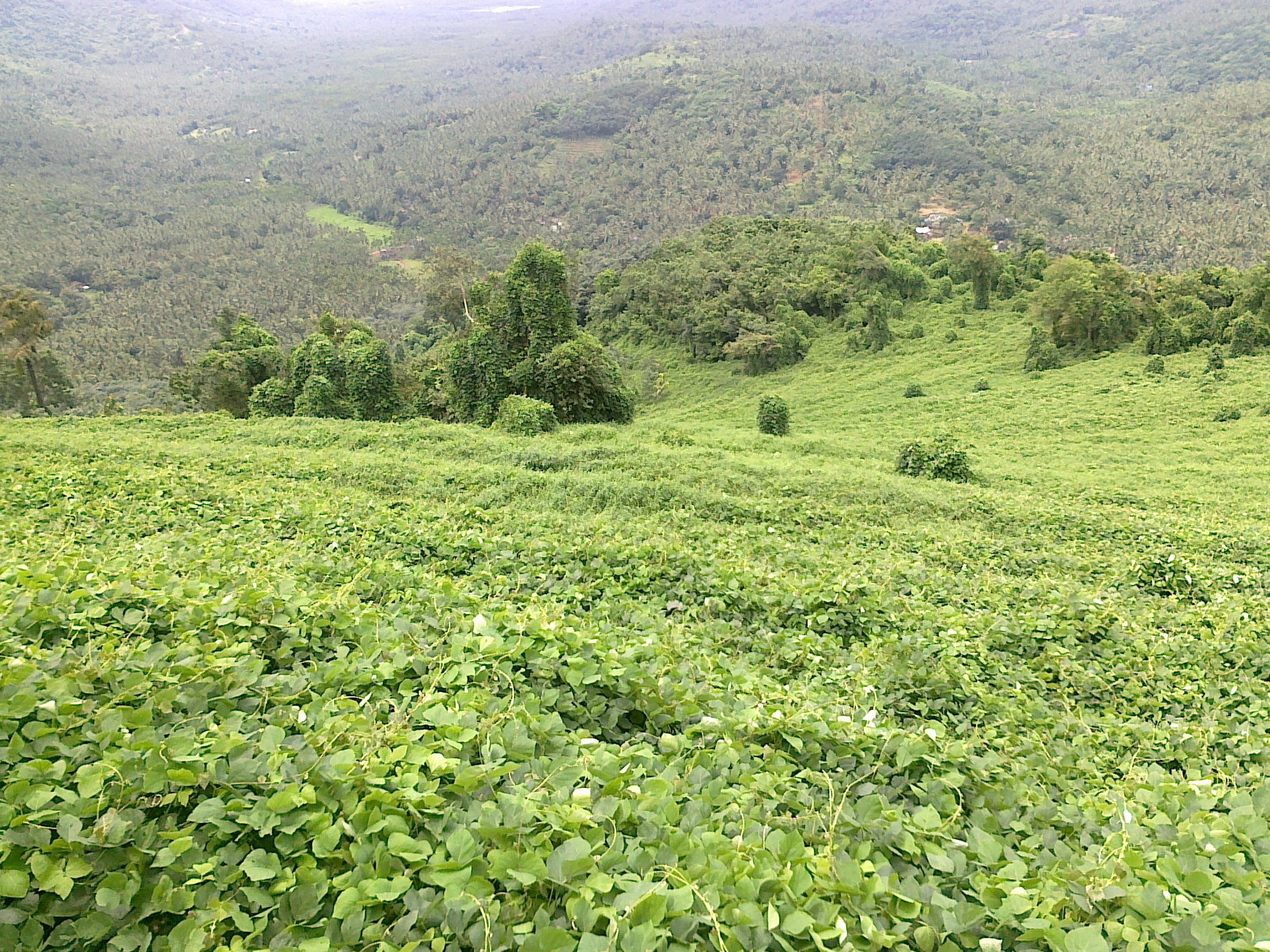

Mini Ooty, or Arimbra Hills, is a small village about 10 kilometres (6.2 mi) from Nediyiruppu. It is a 500 metres (1,600 ft) steep climb from the main road. Mini Ooty can be accessed from Musliyarangadi, Colony Road, Pookkottoor, or Vengara. The route to Mini Ooty passes other small villages, such as Melaparamba, Angadi, Thazhe Colony, Moochikundu, Poolappees and Thiruvonamoola. The roads are in good condition, and a moderately large number of visitors come to see the rolling hills and scenic views. There are many stone crushers and plantations atop the hills. There is an old Dalit colony on the western side of the hill. The hilltop colony in this village was marked officially as Neidiyiruppu on a milestone placed at the road junction. This junction is called Colony Road Junction, after the Harijan colony, Kerala's first, in this village.

== See also ==
- Kondotty
- Valluvambram Junction
- Arimbra
- Pookkottur
- Kottukkara School
