= Cheruputhoor =

- Village
- Location in Kerala, India Cheruputhoor (India)
- Coordinates: 11.1448042°N 76.0406414°E
- Country: India
- State: Kerala
- District: Malappuram
- Lok Sabha Constituency: Malappuram

Area
  - Total: 1.7 km^{2} (0.66 sq mi)
- Elevation: 48 m (157 ft)

Population (2011)
  - Total: 2,103
  - Density: 1,200/km^{2} (3,200/sq mi)

Languages
  - Official: Malayalam
- Time zone: UTC+5:30 (IST)
- PIN: 673642
- Vehicle registration: KL-10
- Website: http://cheruputhoor.blogspot.in

Cheruputhoor or Cheruputhur is a village in Pulpatta Gram panchayat in Malappuram district, Kerala state.

== Educational institutions ==
- AMLP School, Cheruputhoor

== Economy ==
The economy encompasses traditional village farming, small scale businesses and foreign money. A good percentage of natives are working in the Middle East as unskilled workers. The local economy is currently undergoing a construction boom and which is solely dependent on the Gulf money. The main crops that are cultivated are coconut, aracnut, paddy and banana.

== Health care ==
The Government Homoeopathic Dispensary, Pulpatta is situated in Cheruputhoor. It was established in 1978.

== See also ==
AMLP School Cheruputhur
