= Valluvambram Junction =

Valluvambram
- Town
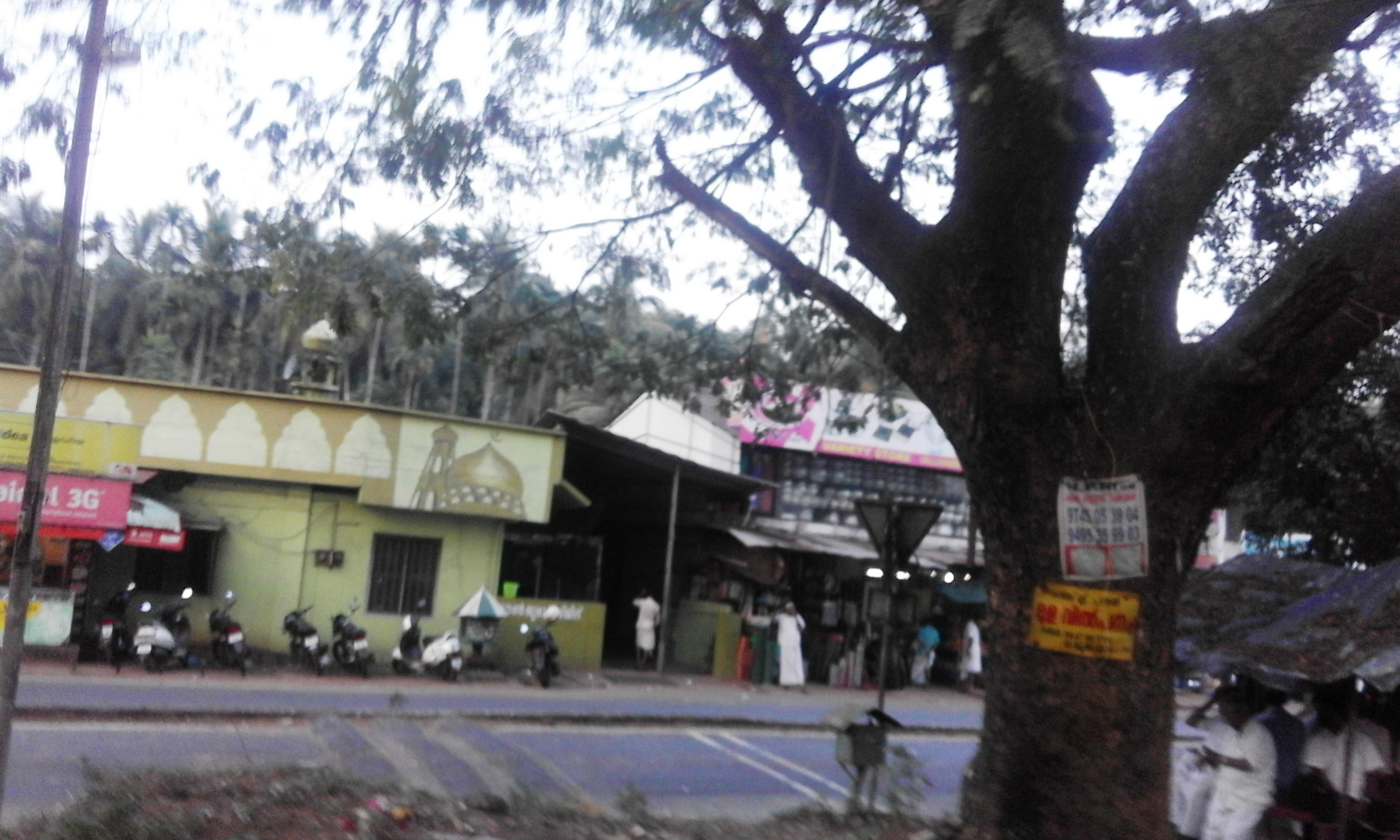
- Valluvambram Junction, Malappuram–Kozhikode Road
- Interactive map of Valluvambram
- Coordinates: 11°07′40″N 76°02′40″E
- Country: India
- State: Kerala
- District: Malappuram

Valluvambram Junction is a small town in Malappuram District, Kerala, India.

== Location ==
Valluvambram Junction is on the National Highway between Malappuram and Kozhikode cities. Valluvambram is a village that splits two main highways to Manjeri Gudallur and Malappuram Palakkad. The place is famous for Selling and Buying Used luxury cars and commercial vehicles from 1980s . One of the TVS Vehicles Showroom is situated in this place, Half Valluvambram.

Distance from Valluvambram:

- Kozhikode: 38 km
- Malappuram: 12 km
- Manjeri: 9 km
- Calicut Airport: 14 km

== Nearby villages ==
- Pookkottur Gram Panchayath
- Pulpatta Gram Panchayath
- Mongam and Morayur
- Cheruputhoor, Thripanachi and Kozhithayi
- Ozhukur and Poonthalaparamba
- Valamangalam and Kallachal
- Thadapparamba and Pappatingal
- Athanikkal and Aravankara
- Melmury and Alathurpady
- Valayattapady and Swalath Nagar
- Pullanoor, Moochikkal and Pullara
- Alukkal, Veembur and Pattarkulam

== Mongam and Morayur ==
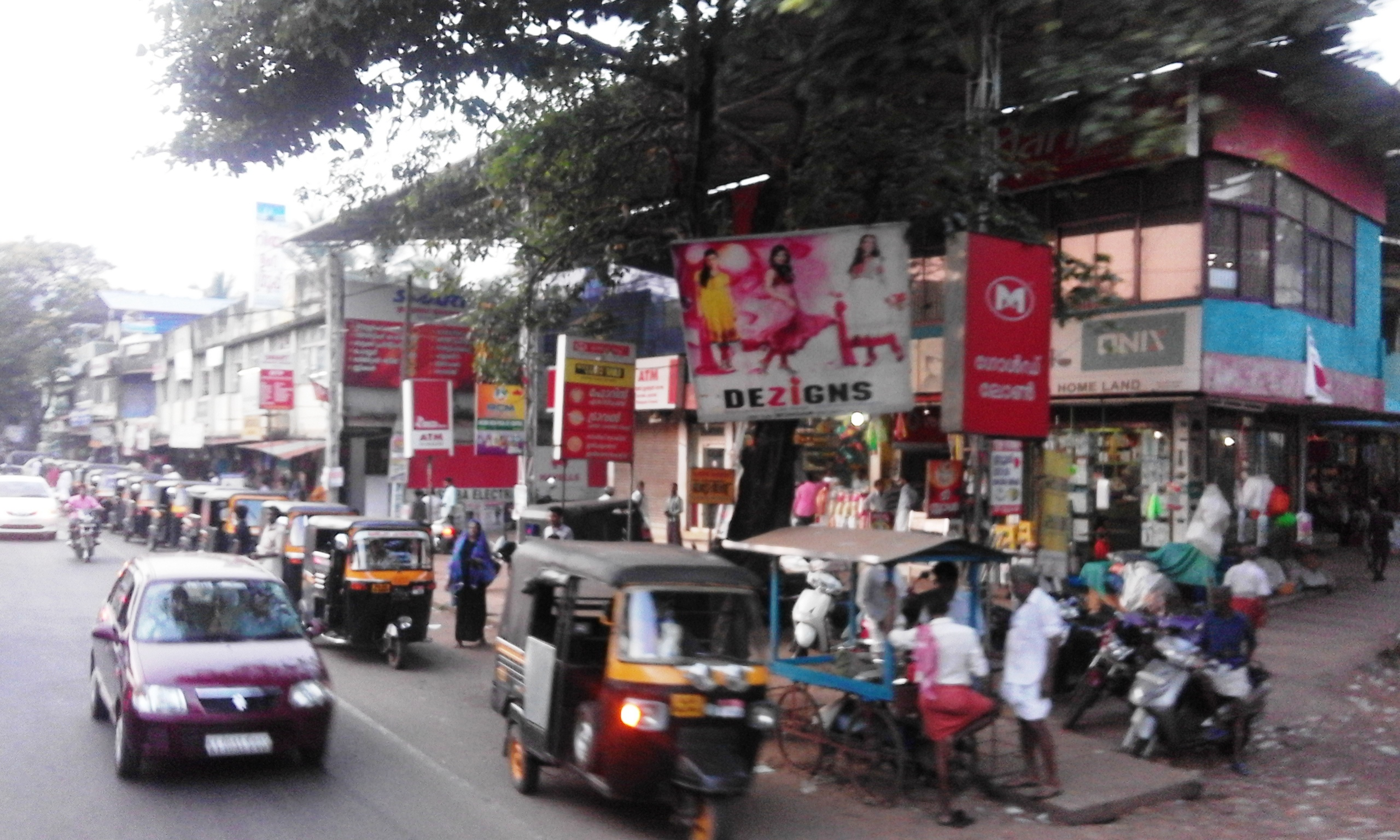
Mongam Town

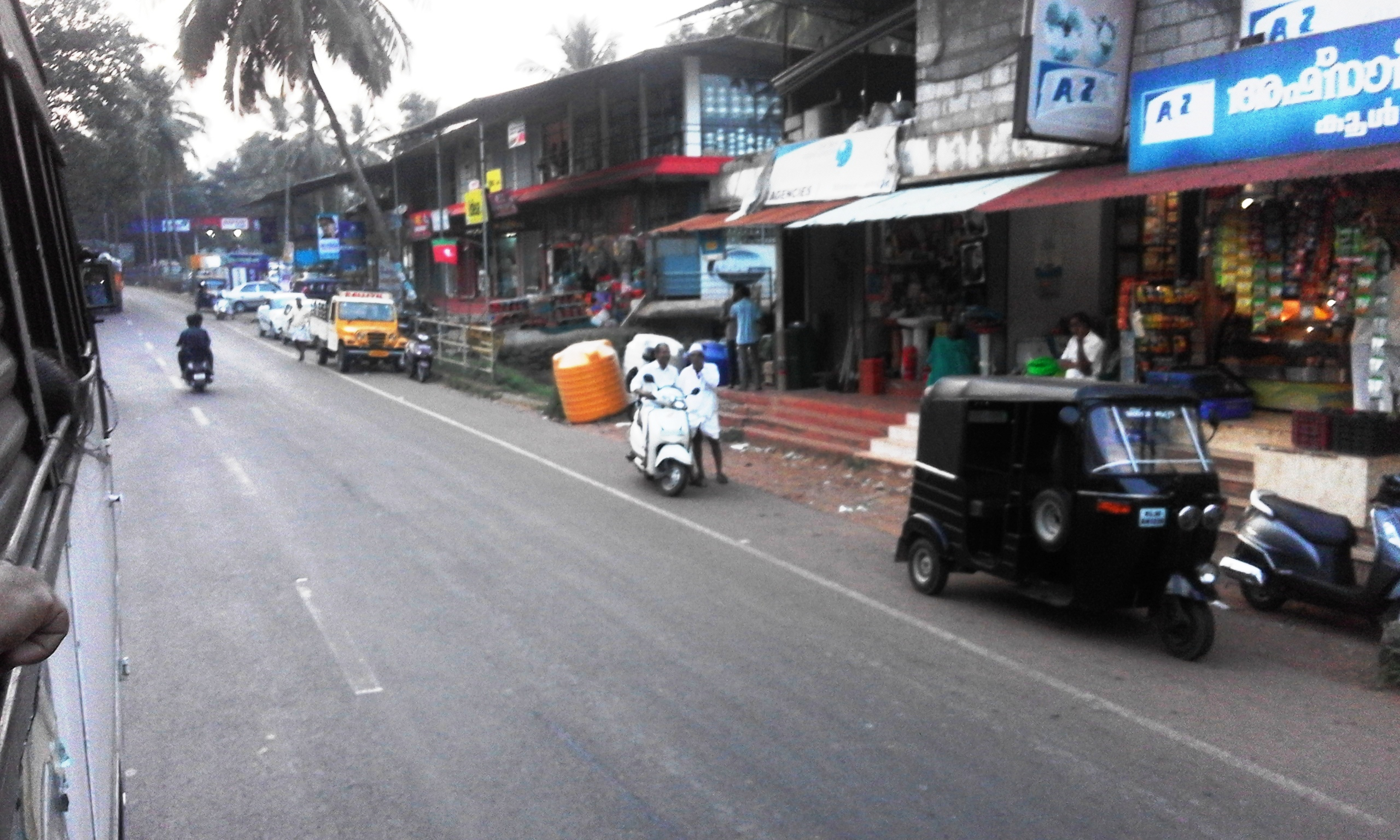
Morayur village

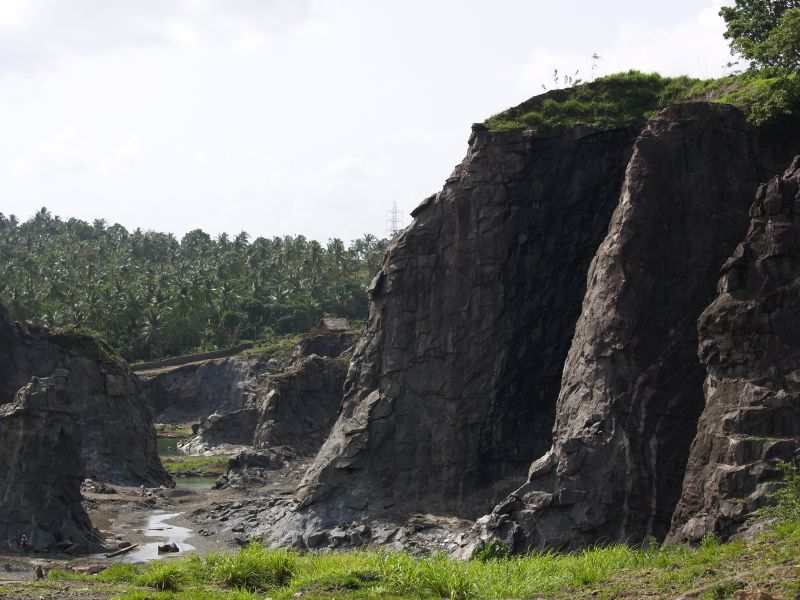
Stone Quarry in Mongam

Mongam and Morayur are two villages lying between Musliyarangadi and Valluvambram towns. Morayur, in Malayalam, means 'Land of peoples who have manners'. Thinayancherry Elayath, a native of Morayur, was a minister of one of the Zamorin kings.

== Educational institutions ==
- AMUP school Valluvambram
- GVHSS Pullanoor, Valluvambram
- MIC ARTS & SCIENCE College Valluvambram
- MIC English Medium High School Valluvambram
- Government School, Pookkottoor

== Culture ==
Valluvambram village is as predominantly Muslim populated area. Hindus are exist in comparatively smaller numbers. So the culture of the locality is based upon Muslim traditions. Duff Muttu, Kolkali and Aravanamuttu are common folk arts of this locality. There are many libraries attached to mosques giving a rich source of Islamic studies. Some of the books are written in Arabi-Malayalam which is a version of the Malayalam language written in Arabic script. People gather in mosques for the evening prayer and continue to sit there after the prayers discussing social and cultural issues. Business and family issues are also sorted out during these evening meetings. The Hindu minority of this area keeps their rich traditions by celebrating various festivals in their temples. Hindu rituals are done here with a regular devotion like other parts of Kerala.

== Transportation ==
Valluvambram Junction is on NH 966. CNG road to Gudalloor gets diverted from here towards Manjeri and NH goes towards Malappuram.

== See also ==
- Pookkottur
- Nediyiruppu
