= Mambeethi =

Village in Kerala, India

Mambeethi is a locality in Oorakam gram panchayat in Vengara mandalam of Tirurangadi taluka in the Malappuram district, in the Indian state of Kerala.

== Culture ==
Mambeethi is predominantly a Muslim area. Hindus reside in comparatively smaller numbers. The culture is based upon Muslim traditions. Duff Muttu, Kolkali and Aravanamuttu are common folk arts of this locality. Many libraries are attached to mosques, offering a rich source of Islamic studies. Most are written in Arabi-Malayalam, which is a version of the Malayalam language written in Arabic script. People gather in mosques for evening prayer and sit there after prayers discussing social and cultural issues. Business and family issues are considered during these evening meetings. Hindus keep their rich traditions by celebrating festivals in their temples.

== Transport ==
Mambeethi connects to other parts of India through Parappanangadi town. National highway No. 66 passes through Ramanattukara and the northern stretch connects to Goa and Mumbai. The southern stretch connects to Cochin and Trivandrum. State Highway No. 28 starts from Nilambur and connects to Ooty, Mysore and Bangalore through Highways No.12, 29 and 181.

The nearest airport is at Kozhikode.

The nearest major railway station is at Parappanangadi.
