= Pulpatta =

- village
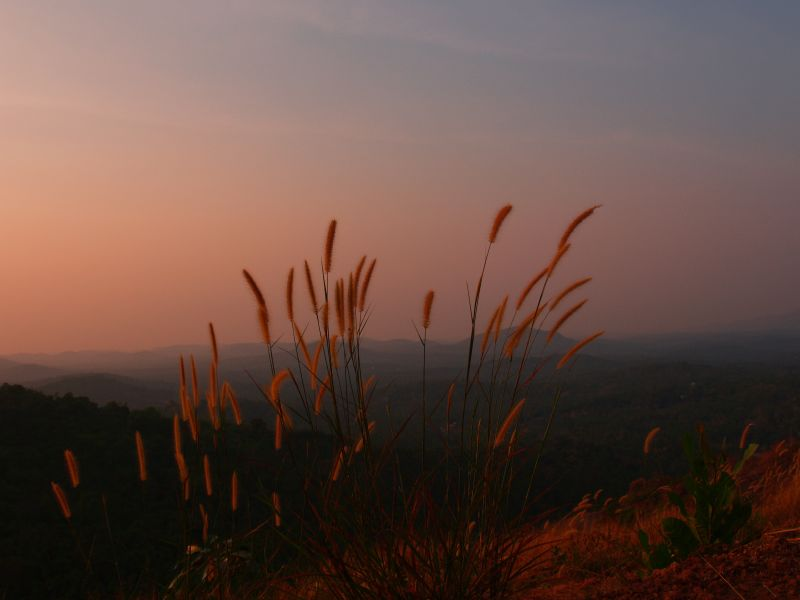
- Valamangalam, Pulpetta
- Interactive map of Pulpatta
- Coordinates: 11.15112°N 76.06693°E
- Country: India
- State: Kerala
- District: Malappuram

Population (2011)
  - Total: 42,683

Languages
  - Official: Malayalam, English
- Time zone: UTC+5:30 (IST)
- PIN: 676123
- Vehicle registration: KL-

Pulpatta or Pulpetta is a village in Eranad Taluk, Malappuram district in the state of Kerala, India. It is 7 km from Manjeri.

== Location ==
Pulpatta is located on the northern side of Mongam, Valluvambram and Manjeri in Malappuram District, India.

== Demographics ==
As of 2011 India census, Pulpatta had a population of 42683 of which 21151 are males while 21532 are females.
