= Pookkottur =

- village
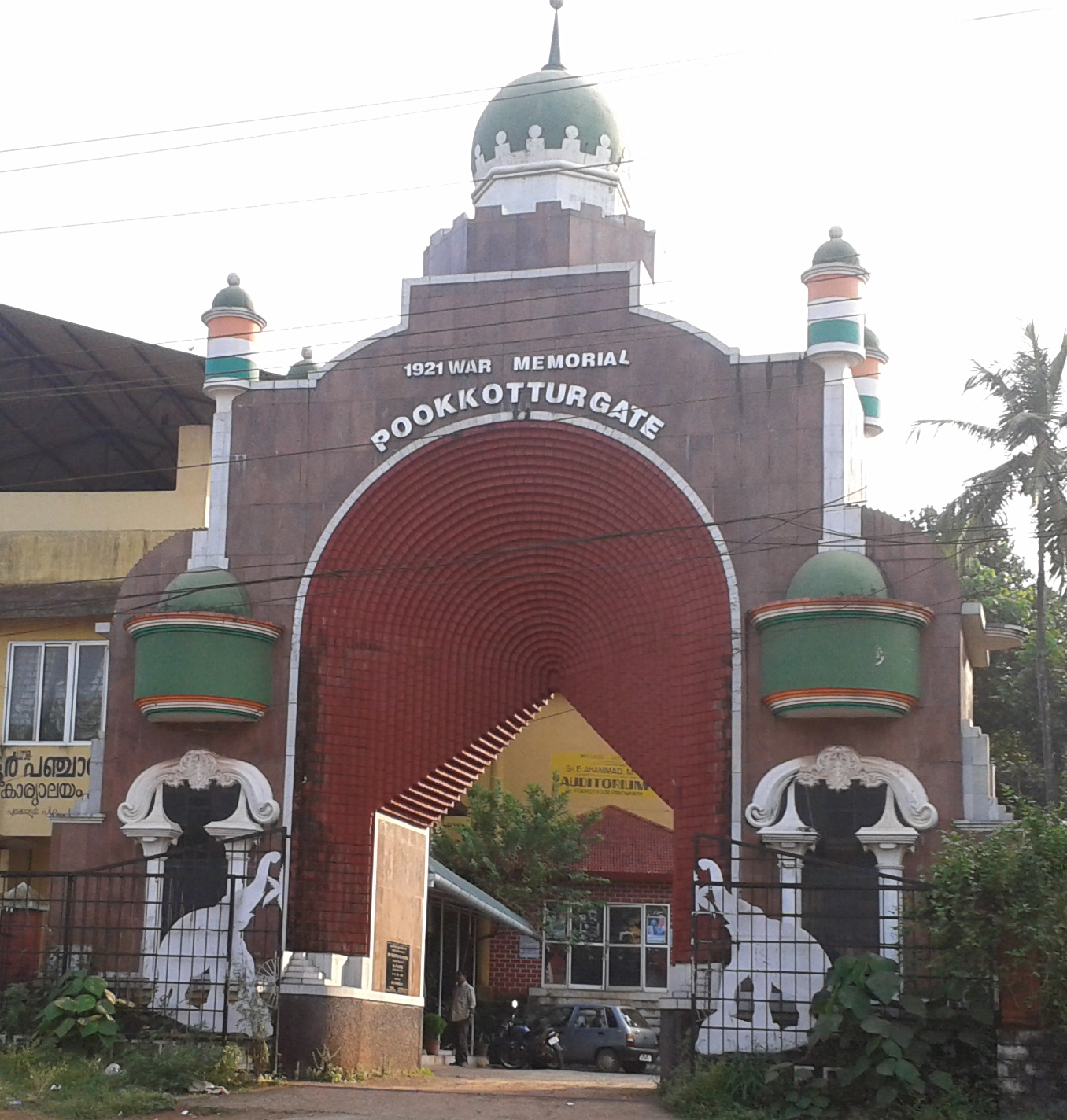
- 1921 War Memorial Gate Pookkottur

- Location in Kerala, India
- Coordinates: 11°5′50″N 76°3′50″E
- Country: India
- State: Kerala
- District: Malappuram

Languages
  - Official: Malayalam, English
- Time zone: UTC+5:30 (IST)
- Vehicle registration: KL-
- Coastline: 0 kilometres (0 mi)
- Nearest city: Malappuram
- Lok Sabha constituency: Malappuram
- Climate: Tropical monsoon (Köppen)
- Avg. summer temperature: 35 °C (95 °F)
- Avg. winter temperature: 20 °C (68 °F)

Pookkottoor is a village in Eranad taluk, and a suburb of Malappuram, Kerala, India. It is on National Highway 966, and there is a state road from the town to Manjeri.

It was the centre of the Malabar Rebellion of 1921 that shook the British administration in the erstwhile Malabar district of Madras Province.

The Malabar Karshikotsavam & Krishi Mela, held from 18 to 30 May 2013, was initiated by the Grama Panchayat president in collaboration with Kerala Agricultural University, Youth Clubs, and Pookkottur Grama Panchayat to transform Pookkottur into a model sustainable green village in Kerala.

== Important landmarks ==
- Pookkottur Juma Masjid
- 1921 War Memorial: Tombs of 460 Mappilas who were killed in battle during the Mappila revolt against Britain in 1921 at Pookkottur
- Pookkottur gate: The Pookkottur war memorial gate is dedicated to those killed in the Pookkottur battle. Along with these monuments, now abandoned

== See also ==
- Nediyiruppu
- Valluvambram
- Arimbra Hills

== Gallery ==
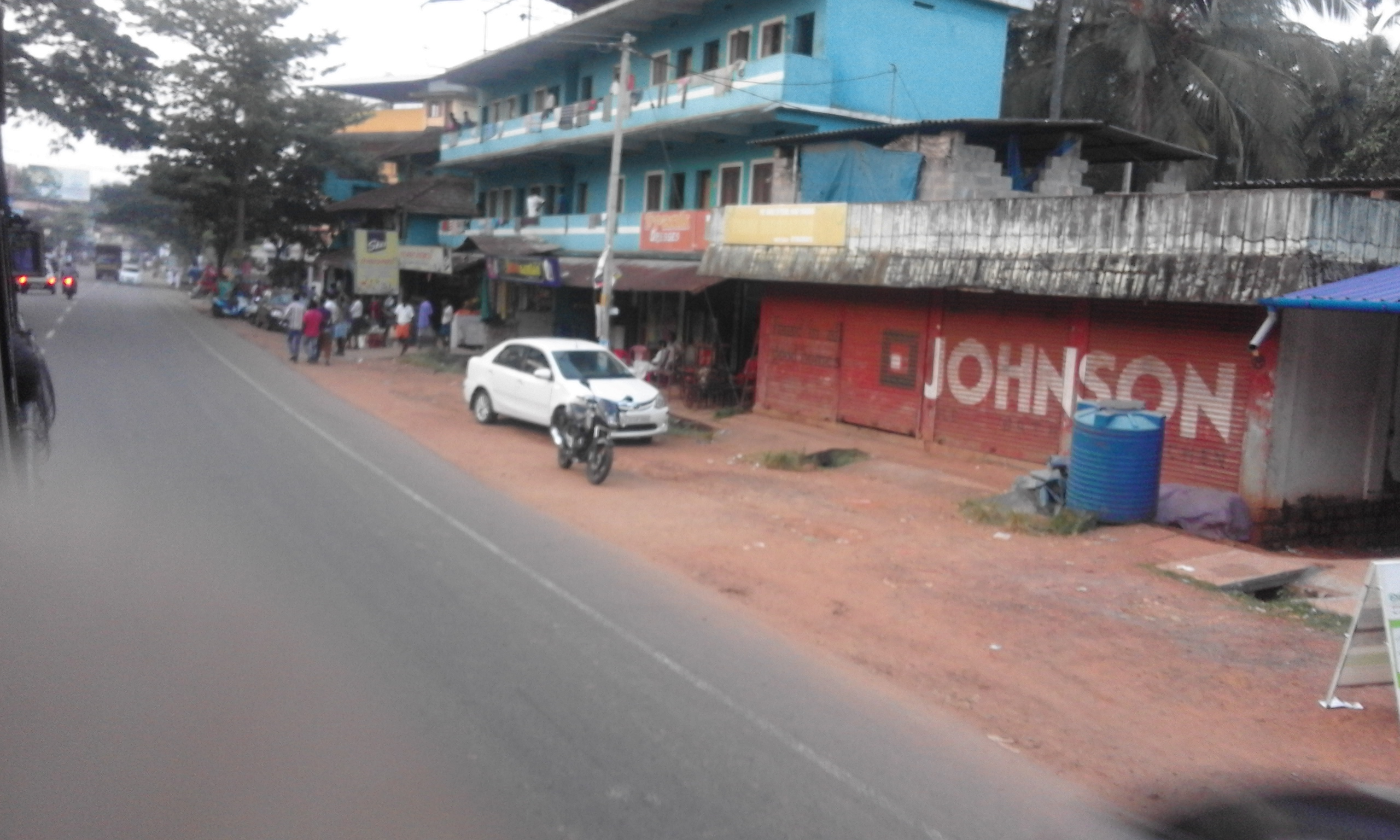
Aravankara, Pookkottur

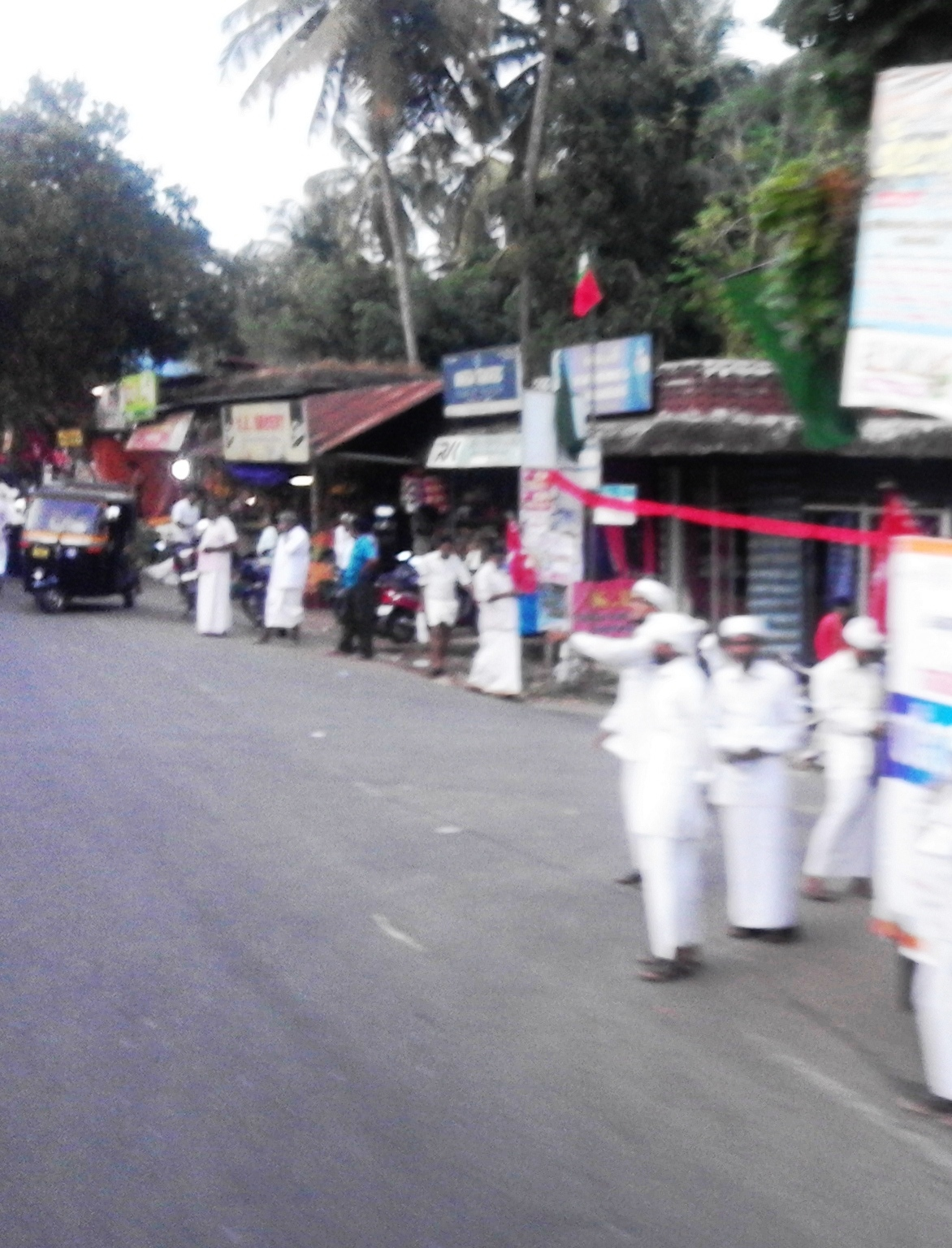
Pookkottur Town
