= Oorakam =

- Census town
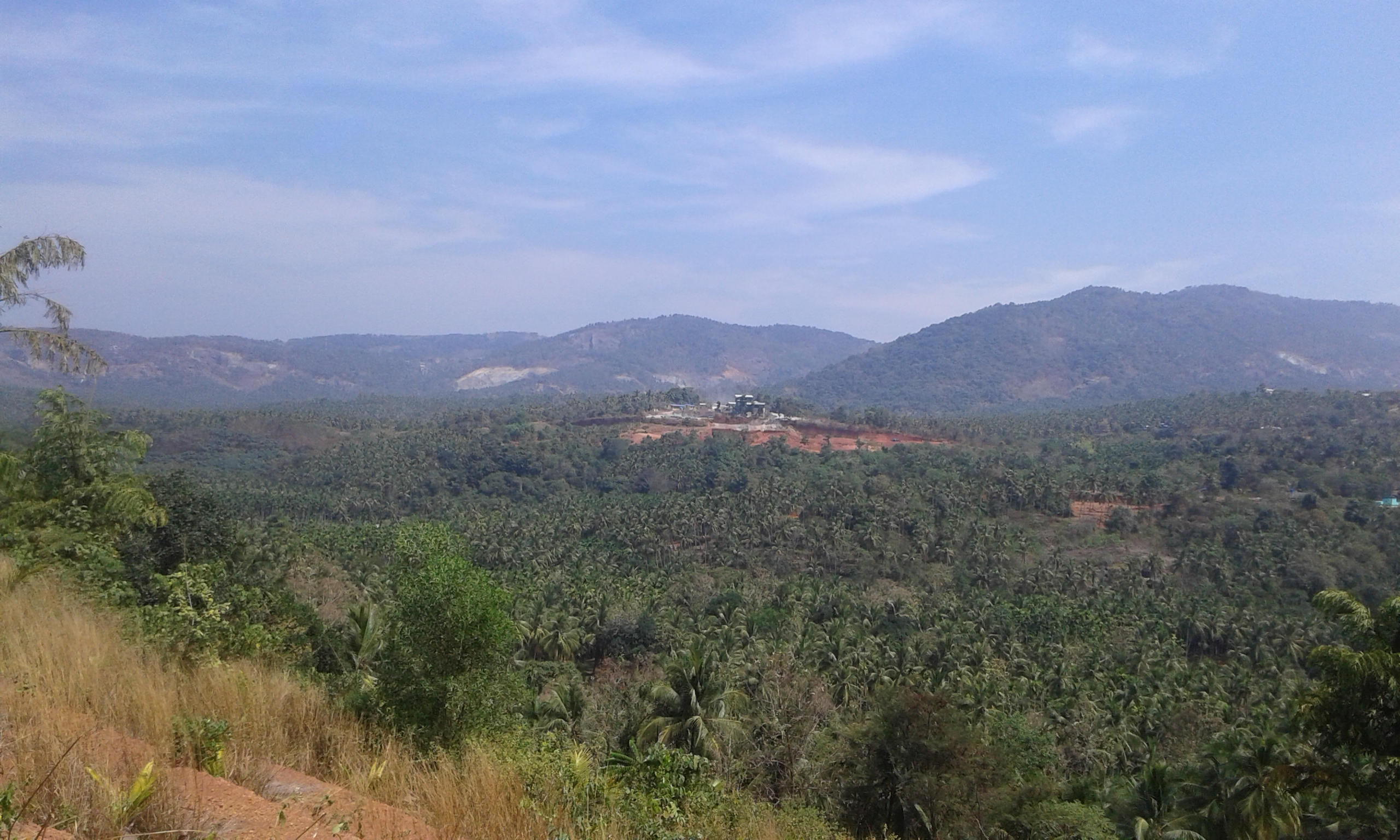
- Ooraka Mala

- Location in Kerala, India Oorakam (India)
- Coordinates: 11.064°N 76.010°E
- Country: India
- State: Kerala
- District: Malappuram

Population (2011)
  - Total: 13,149

Languages
  - Official: Malayalam, English
- Time zone: UTC+5:30 (IST)
- PIN: 676519
- Vehicle registration: KL- 65

Oorakam is a census town in Malappuram district in the state of Kerala, India. Oorakam is located midway between Malappuram and Vengara. Oorakam is approximately 12 km from Malappuram.

== Demographics ==
As of 2011 India census, Oorakam had a population of 13149 with 6229 males and 6920 females.

== Transportation ==
The nearest airport is at Kozhikode. The nearest major railway station is at Parappanangadi. The Oorakam Village connected with local bus services between Malappuram and Vengara. This service running frequently by connecting most of areas in the village.

== Tourist attractions ==
The village is located between Oorakam mountain range and Kadalundi River. Oorakam mala is the biggest mountain range in this area. Mini Ooty is a hill near Arimbra village in Kondotty area which can be accessed from Poolappis Junction on Vengara to Malappuram road. Around 6 km to the peak of the mount from state highway. There is a 2000 years old Jain temple at the top of the mountain.

== Villages ==
- Nellipparamba
- Mambeethi
