= Irumbuzhi =

Village in India

Irumbuzhi is a village situated adjacent to Malappuram Municipality. It is part of Anakkayam panchayath, Malappuram district, Kerala state, India. It is on the banks of the Kadalundi River.

== Culture ==
Irumbuzhi village is a predominantly Muslim populated area. Hindus exist in comparatively smaller numbers. So, the culture of the locality is based on Muslim traditions. Duff Muttu, Kolkali, and Aravanamuttu are common folk arts of this locality. Many libraries are attached to mosques, giving a rich source of Islamic studies. Most books are written in Arabi-Malayalam, a version of the Malayalam language written in Arabic script. People gather in mosques for the evening prayer and continue to sit there after the prayers, discussing social and cultural issues. Business and family issues are also sorted out during these evening meetings. The Hindu minority of this area keeps their rich traditions by celebrating various festivals in their temples. Hindu rituals are done here with regular devotion, like in other parts of Kerala. Vadakkummuri, padinjattummuri, etc, are majorly identified places in this village.

== Transportation ==
Irumbuzhi village is well connected via road through Malappuram. It is on the Malappuram - Manjeri road. Frequent buses are available on both sides. The nearest airport is at Karipur. The nearest major railway station is at Tirur.
