= Ummathoor =

Human settlement in India

Coordinates: 12°04′N 76°54′E

Ummathoor is a village near Civil Station in the state of Kerala, India.

== Description ==
Ummathoor takes its name from a small bushy plant called Ummathunkaya that grows in the area.

The village is near the Anankkadavu palam bridge. People of Ummathoor are very healthy and hard working, owing to the terrain where they live. Many have to climb up a hill of approximately 400 feet (120 m) to buy their daily provisions and vegetables.

Ummathoor is near Civil station but does not fall under the Malappuram municipality.
