= Elankur, Manjeri =

Elankur
- village
- Location in Kerala, India Elankur (India)
- Coordinates: 11°8′0″N 76°10′0″E
- Country: India
- State: Kerala
- District: Malappuram

Population (2011)
  - Total: 20,453

Languages
  - Official: Malayalam, English
- Time zone: UTC+5:30 (IST)
- PIN: 6XXXXX
- Vehicle registration: KL-

Elankur is a village in Trikkalangode Grama Panchayat in Malappuram district in the state of Kerala, India near Manjeri. Most of the people in this village are farmers involved in rice cultivation.

== Demographics ==
As of 2011 India census, Elankur had a population of 20453 with 9706 males and 10747 females.

== Culture ==
Elankur village is a predominantly Muslim populated area. Hindus exist in comparatively smaller numbers. So the culture of the locality is based upon Muslim traditions. Duff Muttu, Kolkali and Aravanamuttu are common folk arts of this locality. There are many libraries attached to mosques giving a rich source of Islamic studies. Most of the books are written in Arabi-Malayalam which is a version of the Malayalam language written in Arabic script. People gather in mosques for the evening prayer and continue to sit there after the prayers discussing social and cultural issues. Business and family issues are also sorted out during these evening meetings. The Hindu minority of this area keeps their rich traditions by celebrating various festivals in their temples. Hindu rituals are done here with a regular devotion like other parts of Kerala.

== Transportation ==
Elankur village connects to other parts of India through Manjeri town. National highway No.66 passes through Parappanangadi and the northern stretch connects to Goa and Mumbai. The southern stretch connects to Cochin and Trivandrum. National Highway No.966 connects to Palakkad and Coimbatore. The nearest airport is at Karipur. The nearest major railway station is at Tirur.
