= Arimbra Hills, Malappuram =

Arimbra Hill Mini Ooty / Cheruppadi Mala
- Hill station
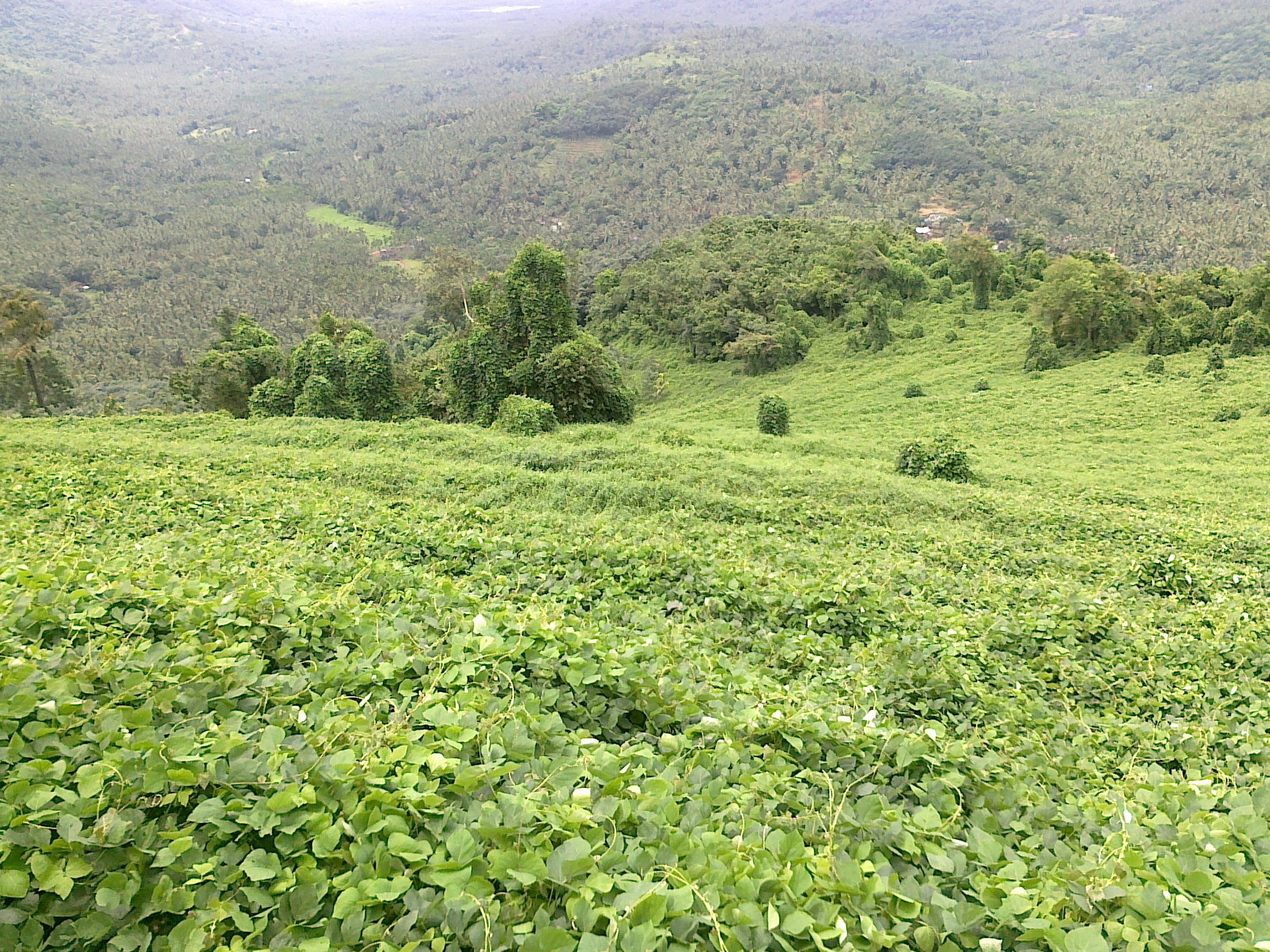
- Arimbra Mala
- Nickname: Cattle-race Competition at Arimbra
- Interactive map of Arimbra Hill
- Coordinates: 11.147°N 75.964°E
- Country: India
- State: Kerala
- City: Kondotty
- District: Malappuram
- Elevation: 445 m (1,460 ft)

Languages
  - Official: Malayalam English
- Time zone: UTC+5:30 (IST)

Arimbra Hills or Mini Ooty is a tourist spot between Malappuram and Kondotty in Malappuram district, Kerala, India. It is at a height of 445 meters (1,460 ft) above sea level. The place attracts a large number of visitors for its rolling hills and scenic views. The location got the nickname "Mini Ooty" because it resembles Ooty, one of the famous hill stations in India. There are many stone crushers and plantations atop the hill. There is an old Scheduled Caste colony on the western side of the hill.

Apart from the Western Ghats, Kerala has five major independent mountains. Of these, three are in Malappuram district, one in Palakkad and one in Kannur. The largest of these five mountains is the Cheriyam mountain at Mankada in Malappuram district. This Cheriyam mountain is also known as Panthalur Hill. Cheriyam mountain is located at an elevation of 613 meters (2,011 ft) above sea level. Mount Amminikkadan is the second highest mountain of this five mountains. The height of this Amminikkadan mountain is 540 meters. This Arimbra mountain in Kondotty in Malappuram district is the third highest mountain of this five mountains. The height of this Arimbra mountain is 445 meters.

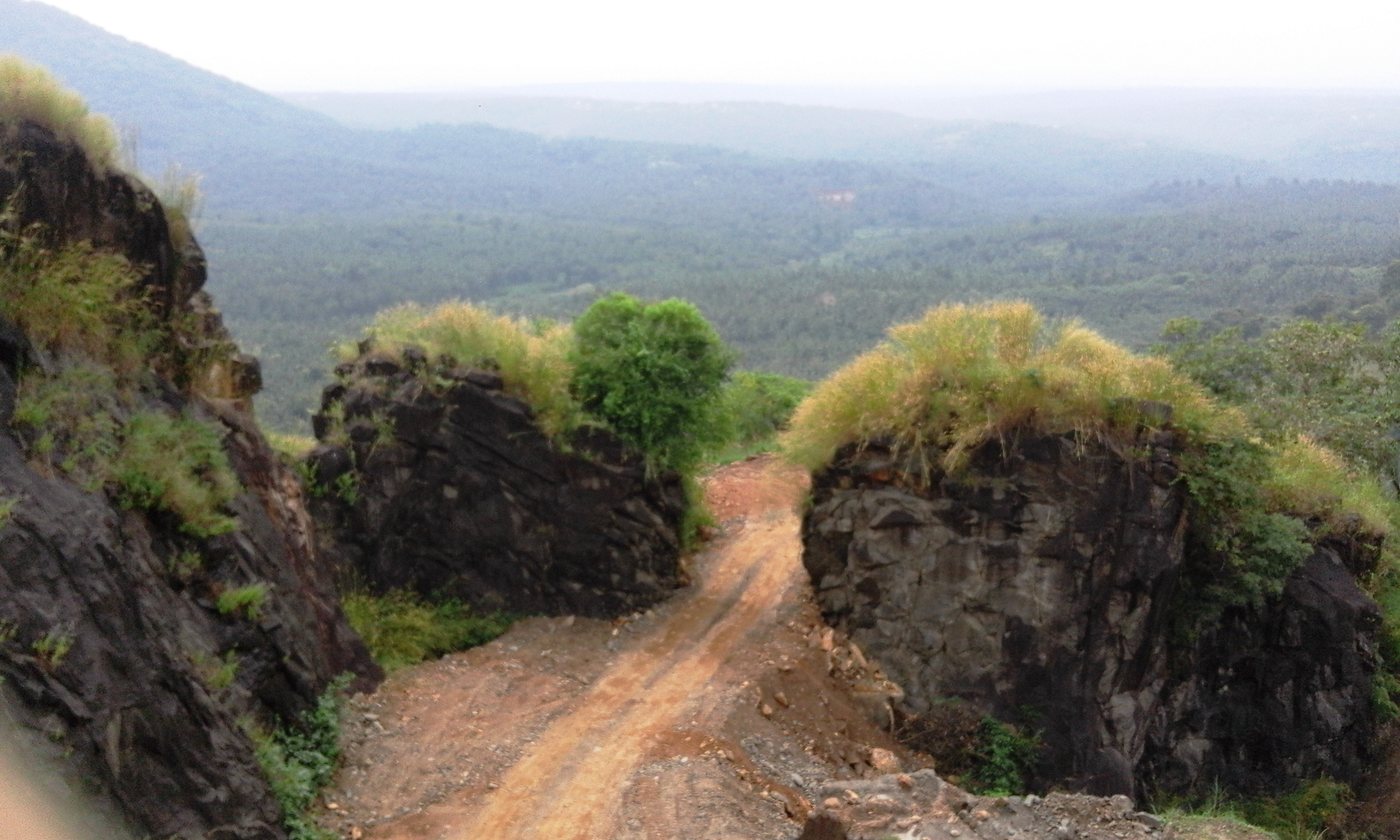
Hill View

== How to reach ==
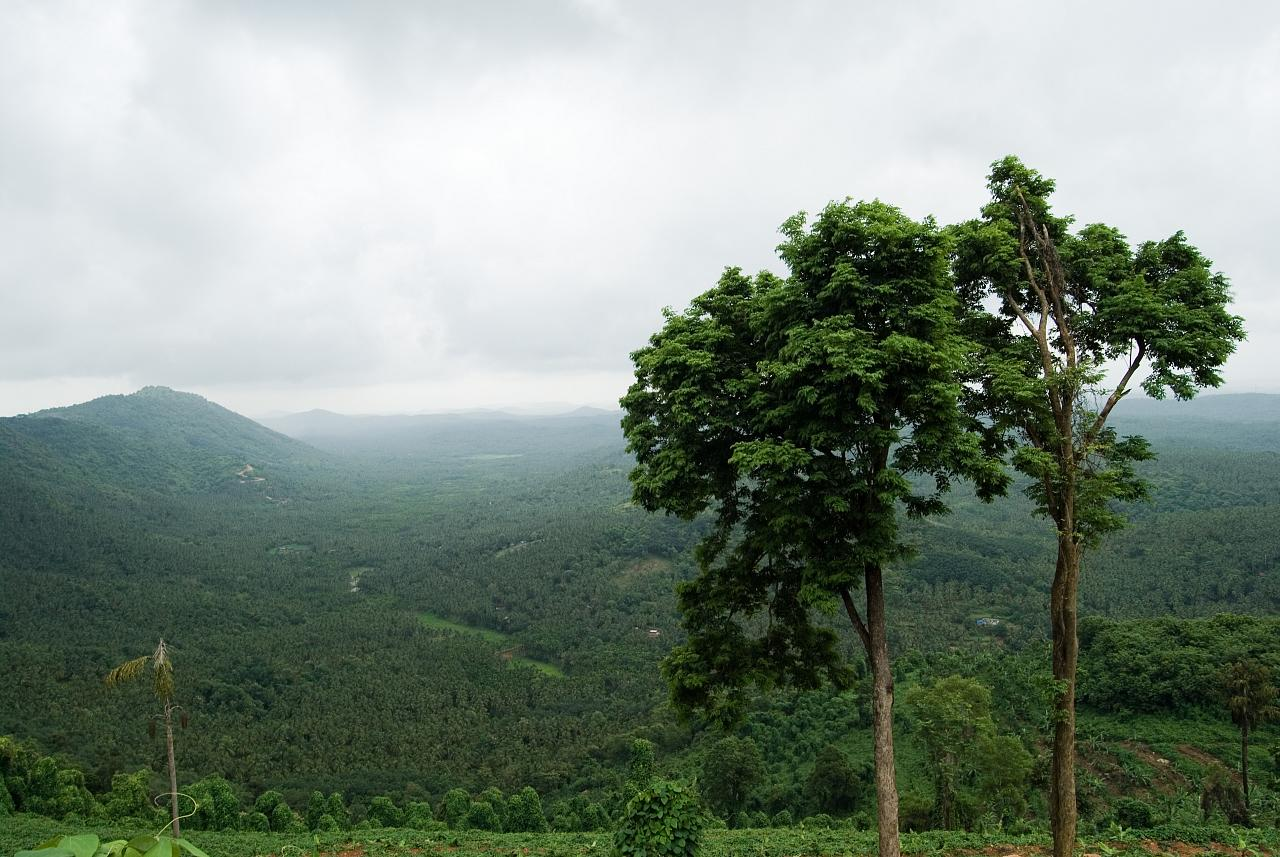
Arimbra Mala

Arimbra Hills can be reached at a distance of 4 km (2.5 mi) from Aravankara near Pookkottoor located in Malappuram - Calicut stretch of NH966. The site is 11 km (6.8 mi) from Karathode, located along Malappuram-Parappanangadi road (SH 72). There are several other minor roads that connect to the region from Pookkottoor, Mongam, Morayur, Musliyarangadi, Kottukara, and Thottassery near Kondotty. An alternative route is available from Poolappis Junction near Oorakam on SH 72. Those who are coming from Calicut can access the hills from Colony Road near Kondotty.

=== Hiking Spots ===
Thiruvonamala, Poolappees, Muchikundu, Cheruppadi Mala, Kunnumpuram and Kakkad are suitable for hiking and also have viewpoints. One can see the runway of Calicut International Airport in full action from these viewpoints. Now, it is home to several tourist attractions, including a children's park, aquarium and a pets park.

== History ==
Arimbra was a separate Revenue Village called Amsom at the time of the British Raj. When the village head, or Adhikari, was suspended by British authorities due to some allegations against him, the Morayur village head (Adhikari) Kodithodika Valiya Ahammed Kutty Haji was given charge then. Later, Arimbra merged with Morayur Revenue Village.

== Schools ==
Government Vocational Higher Secondary School, Arimbra is one of the oldest schools in the area. The football ground of the high school is set in the Arimbra Hills.

A UP School and a Sunni madrasa are also in the village.

== See also ==
- Morayur
- Mongam
- Valluvambram Junction
- Arimbra Bapu
- Nediyiruppu
