= Morayur =

Town in Kerala, India

Coordinates: 11.13579°N 76.01792°E

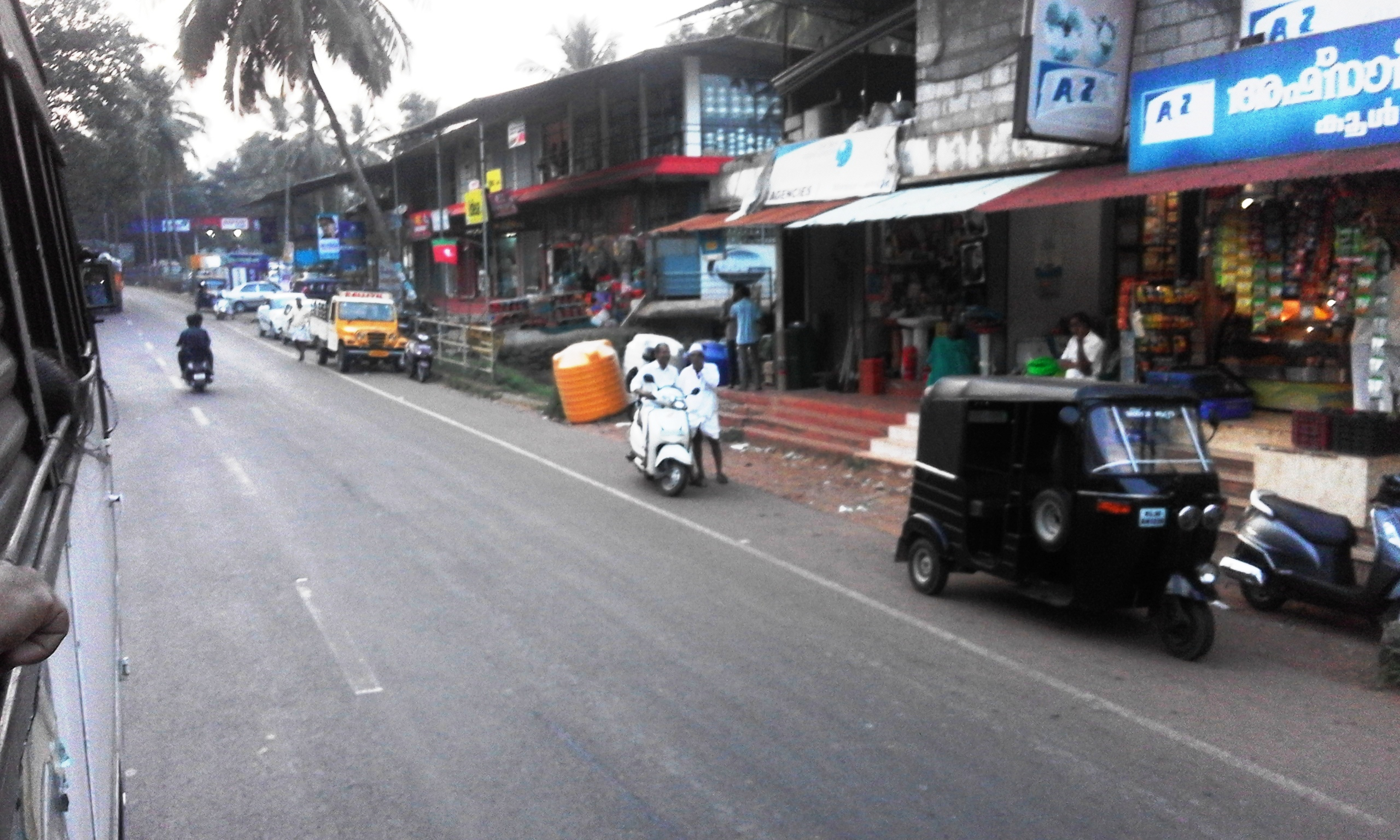
Morayur Town

Morayur or Morayoor is a town near Malappuram Located on Palakkad-Kozhikoad Highway (NH 966). It is one of the villages (Gram panchayat also) in Malappuram district of state of Kerala.

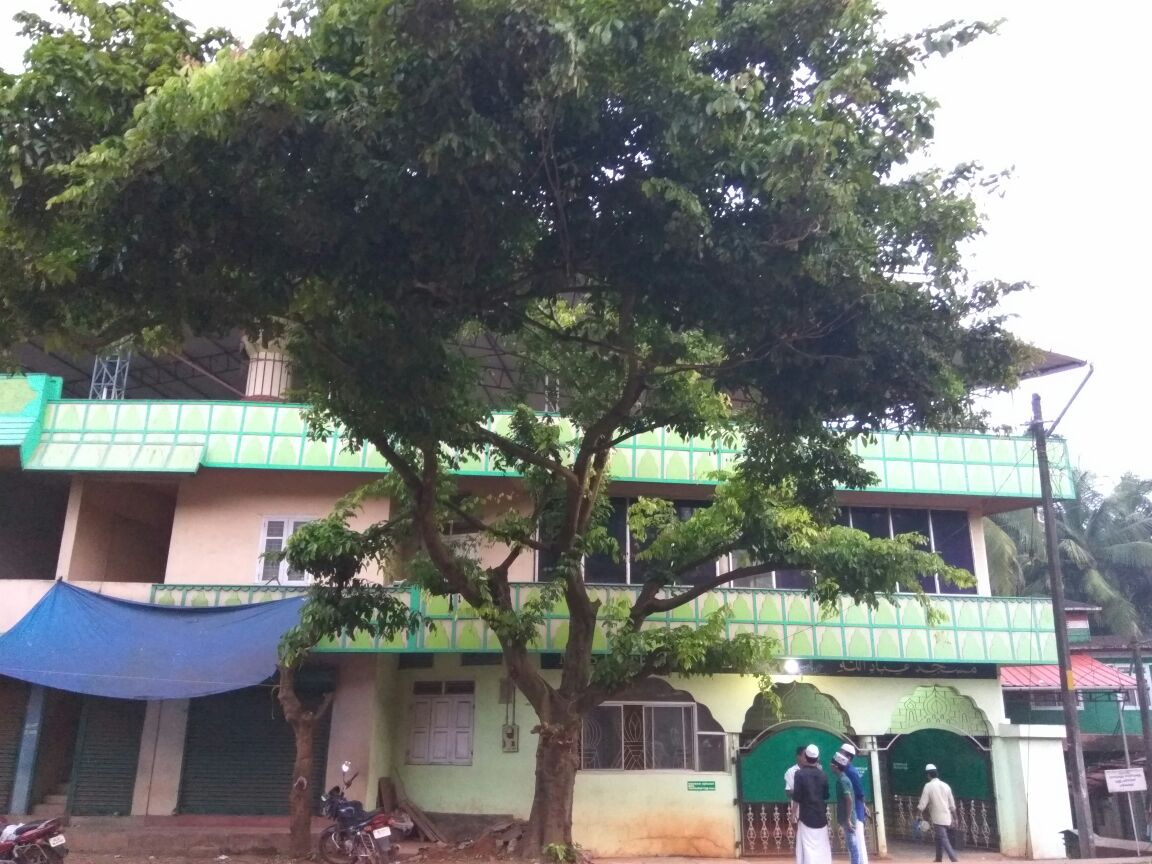
Valenchery Mosque

== Etymology ==
Morayur, in Malayalam, means 'Land of peoples who has manners i.e. mora=manners + yuru=land of'. But it just an opinion with no authentic proof.

== Location ==
Morayur is situated 15.8 km north of Malappuram, the place is in the route of Kozhikode (Calicut) - PalakkadNH 213).

== History ==
The history of Morayur has connection with Zamorin Kingdom of Kozhikode. Thinayancherry Elayath was one of the ministers of Zamorin king and he was a native to the place in which he was the family head of mongambulath family of landlords. One Muslim family named 'Kodithodika' was the major family from the earlier history of morayur. At the time of British ruling, it was a common practice to appoint 'Adhikaries' (present day Village Officer) from the major families of the place with inheritance right, so the post was with Kodithodika Family in morayur and it continued after the Independence up to year 1961 when village Reunion ed. The Kodithodika Muhammed Adhikari was the successor of Kodithodika Ahammed Kutty Haji and was the last of his kind, up to year 1970 he was the Adhikari of morayur village. The first Gram panchayat elected President was Kodithodika Ahmed alias Bappu in year 1969 and he continued up-to year 1995.

== Arimbra Bappu ==
Kodithodi Ahamed alias Bapu (1 May 1936 – 4 July 2014)[1] popularly known as Arimbra Bapu (Malayalam: അരിമ്പ്ര ബാപ്പു) or Bapu (Malayalam: ബാപ്പു) was a politician from the state of Kerala, India belonging to the Indian Union Muslim League party. He served as the first President of Morayur Gram panchayat from year 1969 to 1995, as he was elected continuously, sometimes without opposition. He avoided sound politics after he had a brain stroke, up to the second incident of stroke, which caused his death on 4 July 2014. Several times the party called on him to be the state Minister and MLA; he rejected the opportunities. He worked with many well known politicians of the IUML (C. H. Mohammed Koya and Chakeri Ahammed Kutty), and with the Panakkad Thangal. He was instrumental in raising party membership in Eranad. He served many capacities in the party and the government.

== Educational institutions ==
- Govt. M.U.P School Ozhukur
- V.H.M.H.S.S.Morayur
- Govt. V.H.S.S.Arimbra
- G L P S Morayur (Valenchery)
- C.H.S.S. Ozhukur
- A M L P S Ozhukur
- Govt. M.U.P.School, Arimbra
- Aided M.U.P.School, Mongam
- Govt. M.L.P.School, Arimbra-melmuri
- Govt. L.P.School. Morayur
- A M L P School, Keezhymuri
- DPEP-SSA block Resource Center

== Demographics ==
As of 2011 India census, Morayur had a population of 33960 with 16299 males and 17661 females.

== Transportation ==
Morayur village connects to other parts of India through Feroke town on the west and Nilambur town on the east. National highway No.213 passes through Morayur and the northern stretch connects to Goa and Mumbai. The southern stretch connects to Cochin and Trivandrum. State Highway No.28 starts from Nilambur and connects to Ooty, Mysore and Bangalore through Highways.12,29 and 181. The nearest airport is at Kozhikode. The nearest major railway station is at Feroke.
