= Mongam =

- Town
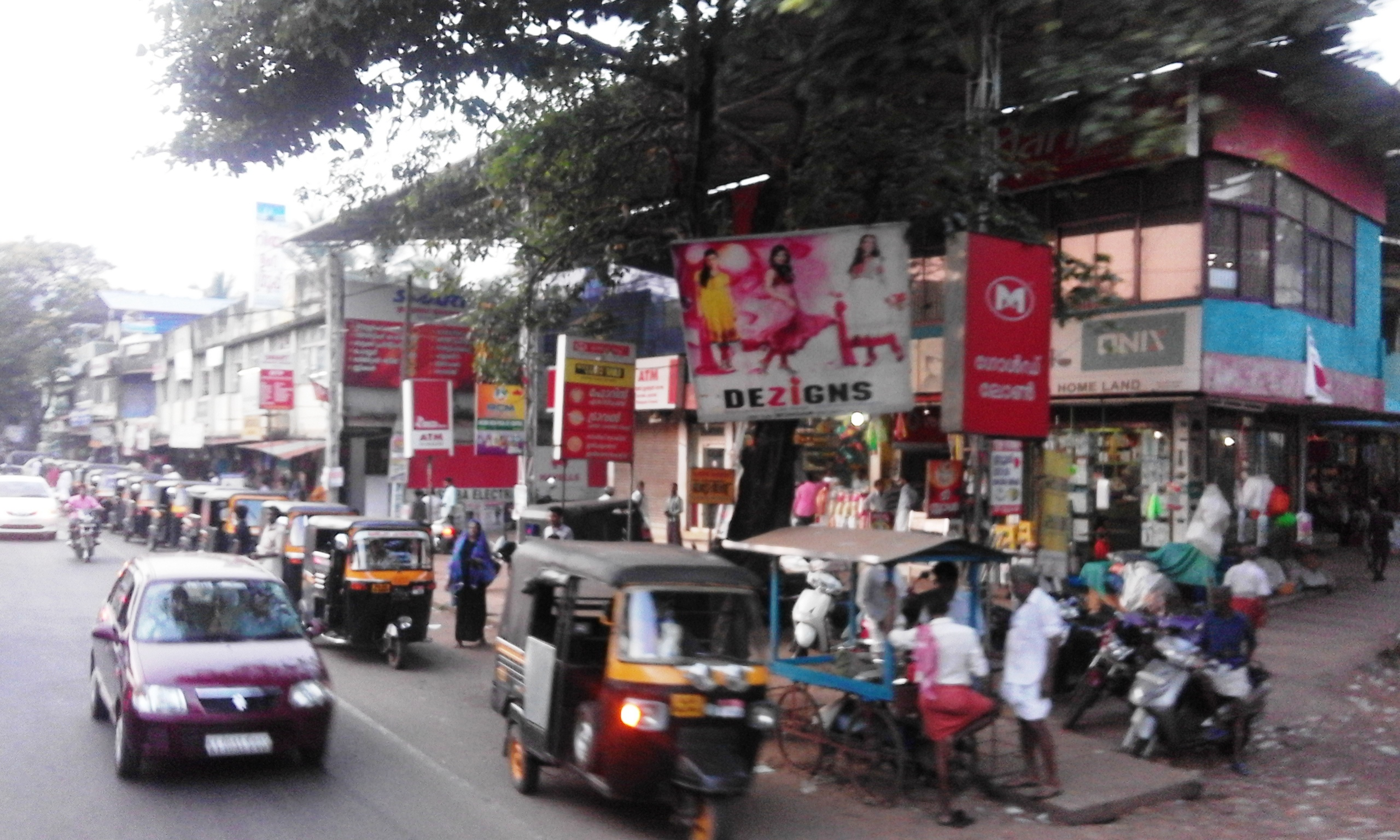
- Mongam Town

- Location in Kerala, India Mongam (India)
- Coordinates: 11.1272336°N 76.0186636°E
- Country: India
- State: Kerala
- District: Malappuram

Languages
  - Official: Malayalam
- Time zone: UTC+5:30 (IST)
- PIN: 673642
- Telephone code: 0483
- Vehicle registration: KL10

Mongam is a town in Morayur Gram panchayat in Malappuram (Lok Sabha constituency) in Malappuram district of state of Kerala. Mongam AIWA College is the first women's Arabic college in south India.

The name Mongam is derived from the local banana plant business of the village in the past. The town was well known for banana plantation in this period. In the 1980s Mongam was famous for Mahindra Jeep business and the town is still known for jeep business.

== Location ==
Mongam is on the National Highway 966 between Malappuram and Kozhikode cities. This place is famous for selling and buying used luxury cars and commercial vehicles since 1980.

== Educational Institutions ==
- Anvarul Islam Women’s Arabic College, Mongam
- A.M.U.P. School Mongam
- Little India Public School, Mongam
- Ummul Qura Higher Secondary School, Mongam
- Al Irshad Public School Trippanachi( Near Mongam )

== Transportation ==
Mongam connects to other parts of India through Kozhikode and Malappuram cities. National highway 966 passes through Mongam and the northern stretch connects to Goa and Mumbai. The southern stretch connects to Cochin and Coimbatore. State Highway 28 starts from kozhikkode and connects to Ooty, Mysore and Bangalore through Highways. The nearest airport is at Kozhikode. The nearest railway station is at Feroke. The nearest beach is Parappangadi beach, which is about 22 kilometers away.
