= Kondotty taluk =

Kondotty Taluk
- Taluk
- Location in Malappuram district, Kerala, India
- Coordinates: 11.152610°N 75.956678°E
- Country: India
- State: Kerala
- District: Malappuram
- Headquarters: Kondotty

Languages
  - Official: Malayalam, English
- Time zone: UTC+5:30 (IST)
- PIN: 673638
- Vehicle registration: KL-84

Kondotty Taluk, otherwise called Western Eranad, in Malappuram district of Kerala, India. Its headquarters is the town of Kondotty. Kondotty Taluk contains Kondotty municipality and a few Gram panchayats.

== History ==
Kondotty Taluk was declared as the seventh taluk in Malappuram district by chief minister Oommen Chandy on 23 December 2013. It was formed by carving the villages included in the erstwhile Kondotty Revenue block out of Eranad and Tirurangadi Taluks.

== Villages ==
Kondotty Taluk comprises 12 villages (sub-divisions):

- Vazhakkad
- Vazhayur
- Cherukavu
- Pulikkal
- Kondotty
- Muthuvallur
- Pallikkal
- Chelembra
- Cheekkode
- Nediyiruppu
- Morayur
- Kuzhimanna

== See also ==
- List of villages in Malappuram district
- List of Gram Panchayats in Malappuram district
- List of desoms in Malappuram district (1981)
- Revenue Divisions of Kerala
- Malappuram district
