= Vallikunnu Assembly constituency =

Constituency of the Kerala legislative assembly in India

Vallikunnu
- Constituency No. 42 for the Kerala Legislative Assembly
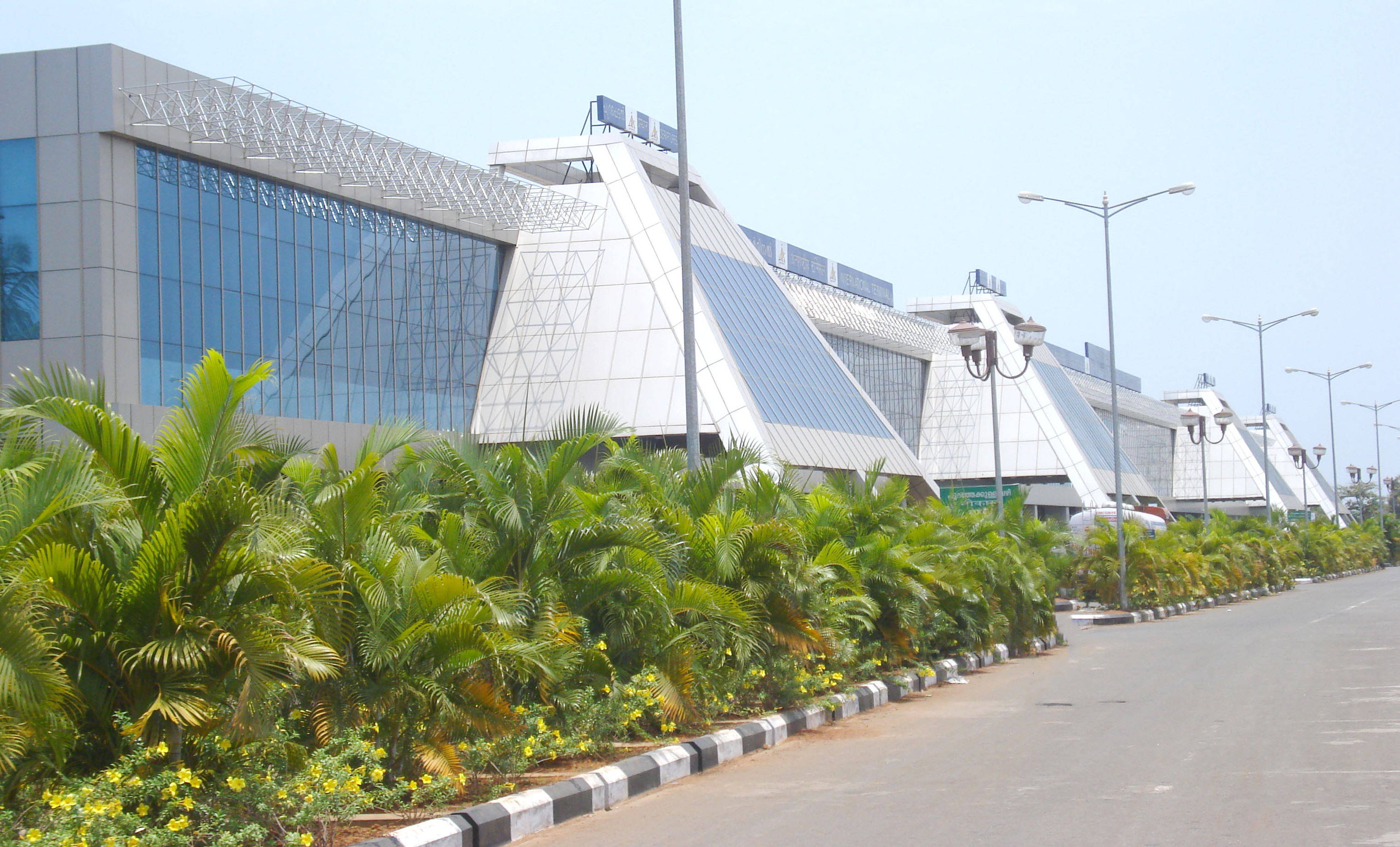
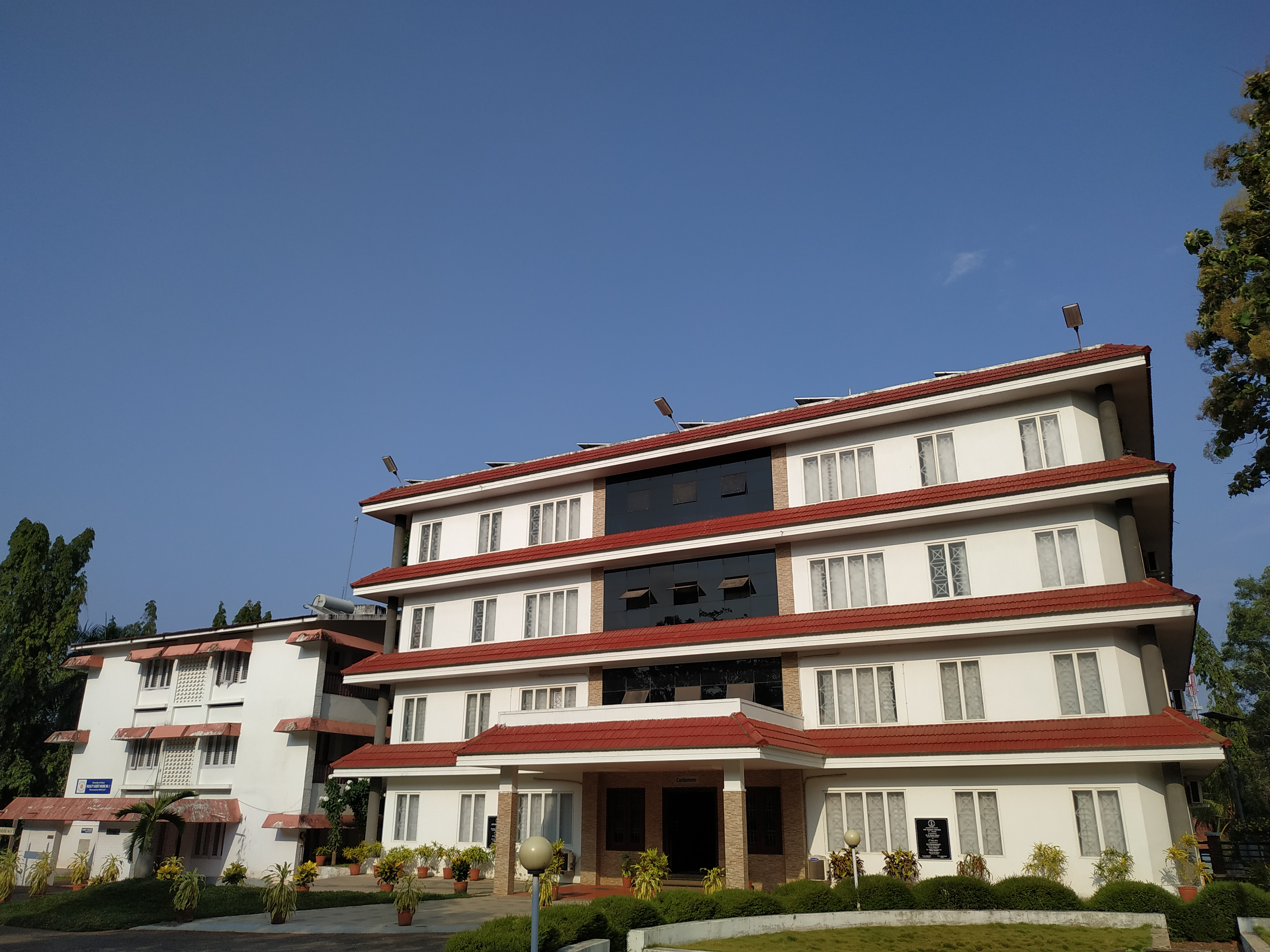
- Top to bottom: Calicut International Airport at Pallikkal, and The guesthouse of University of Calicut at Tenhipalam

Constituency details
- Country: India
- Region: South India
- State: Kerala
- District: Malappuram
- Established: 2008
- Total electors: 1,98,814 (2021)
- Reservation: None

Member of Legislative Assembly
- 16th Kerala Legislative Assembly
- Incumbent T. V. Ibrahim
- Party: IUML
- Alliance: UDF
- Elected year: 2026

Vallikunnu State assembly constituency is one of the 140 state legislative assembly constituencies in Kerala in southern India. It is also one of the seven state legislative assembly constituencies included in Malappuram Lok Sabha constituency. As of the 2026 Assembly elections, the current MLA is T. V. Ibrahim of IUML.

== Local self-governed segments ==
Vallikunnu Assembly constituency is composed of the following local self-governed segments:

Sl no.	Name	Status (Grama panchayat/Municipality)	Taluk
1	Vallikunnu	Grama panchayat	Tirurangadi
2	Peruvallur	Grama panchayat	Tirurangadi
3	Tenhipalam	Grama panchayat	Tirurangadi
4	Moonniyur	Grama panchayat	Tirurangadi
5	Chelembra	Grama panchayat	Kondotty
6	Pallikkal	Grama panchayat	Kondotty

Vallikunnu Assembly constituency

== Members of Legislative Assembly ==
The following list contains all members of Kerala Legislative Assembly who have represented Vallikunnu Assembly constituency during the period of various assemblies:

Key

IUML

Election	Niyama Sabha	Member	Party	Tenure
2011	13th	K. N. A. Khader	IUML	2011 – 2016
2016	14th	P. Abdul Hameed	IUML	2016 - 2021
2021	15th	P. Abdul Hameed	IUML	2021-2026
2026	16th	T. V. Ibrahim	IUML	2026-

== Election results ==
Percentage change (±) denotes the change in the number of votes from the immediate previous election.

=== 2026 ===
2026 Kerala Legislative Assembly election: Vallikunnu
Party	Candidate	Votes	%	±%
IUML	T. V. Ibrahim	100,718		
LDF	C. P. Musthafa	49,429		
BJP	M. Preman Master	23,283		
Independent	Muhamed Musthafa Pamangadan	3,698		
AAP	Abdul Azeez Kadalundi	1,575		
NOTA	None of the above	1,261		
Independent	Muhammed Aslam V. P.	1,058		
Margin of victory		51,289		
Turnout		1,81,022		
IUML hold		Swing		

=== 2021 ===
There were 1,98,814 registered voters in the constituency for the 2021 Kerala Assembly election.

2021 Kerala Legislative Assembly election: Vallikkunnu
Party	Candidate	Votes	%	±%
IUML	P. Abdul Hameed	71,823	47.43	▲3.99
INL	A. P. Abdul Wahab	57,707	38.11	▲3.84
BJP	Peethambaran Palat	19,853	13.11	▼3.54
NOTA	None of the above	1,150	0.76	▲0.21
BSP	Sasi Kizhakkan	881	0.58	▲0.07
Margin of victory		14,116	9.32	▲0.15
Turnout		1,51,414	76.16	▲1.30
IUML hold		Swing	▲3.99	

=== 2016 ===
There were 1,83,645 registered voters in Vallikunnu Assembly constituency for the 2016 Kerala Assembly election.

2016 Kerala Legislative Assembly election: Vallikunnu
Party	Candidate	Votes	%	±%
IUML	P. Abdul Hameed	59,720	43.44	▼7.09
INL	Adv. O. K. Thangal	47,110	34.27	▼0.26
BJP	K. Janachandran Master	22,887	16.65	▲6.85
PDP	Nissar Methar	2,975	2.16	▼0.19
SDPI	Haneefa Haji	2,499	1.82	▼0.45
NOTA	None of the above	752	0.55	−
BSP	Praveen Kumar	705	0.51	▼0.01
Margin of victory		12,610	9.17	▼6.83
Turnout		1,37,484	74.86	▲2.47
IUML hold		Swing	▼7.09	

=== 2011 ===
There were 1,56,307 registered voters in the constituency for the 2011 election.

2011 Kerala Legislative Assembly election: Vallikunnu
Party	Candidate	Votes	%	±%
IUML	K. N. A. Khader	57,250	50.53	
Independent	K .V. Sankaranarayanan	39,128	34.53	
BJP	Preman	11,099	9.80	
PDP	Salam Mooonniyur	2,666	2.35	
SDPI	Abdul Latheef	2,571	2.27	
BSP	Neelakantan Chelari	590	0.52	
Margin of victory		18,122	16.00	
Turnout		1,13,304	72.49	
IUML win (new seat)				

== See also ==
- Vallikunnu
- Malappuram district
- List of constituencies of the Kerala Legislative Assembly
- 2016 Kerala Legislative Assembly election
