= Urangattiri =

- village
- Location in Kerala, India Urangattiri (India)
- Coordinates: 11°14′0″N 76°2′0″E
- Country: India
- State: Kerala
- District: Malappuram

Population (2011)
  - Total: 31,601

Languages
  - Official: Malayalam, English
- Time zone: UTC+5:30 (IST)
- PIN: 673639
- Vehicle registration: KL-

Urangattiri is a village in Malappuram district in the state of Kerala, India. It is situated in the valley of Chaliyar. There are 21 wards in this village.

== Location ==
Urangattiri is located on the north and east side of Areekode town in Malappuram District, Kerala, India.

== Transportation ==
Urangattiri village connects to other parts of India through Feroke town on the west and Nilambur town on the east. National highway No.66 passes through Pulikkal and the northern stretch connects to Goa and Mumbai. The southern stretch connects to Cochin and Trivandrum. State Highway No.28 starts from Nilambur and connects to Ooty, Mysore and Bangalore through Highways.12,29 and 181. The nearest airport is at Kozhikode. The nearest major railway station is at Feroke.

== Demographics ==
As of 2011 Indian census, Urangattiri had a population of 31601 with 15615 males and 15986 females.
