= Vazhayur =

- Census town
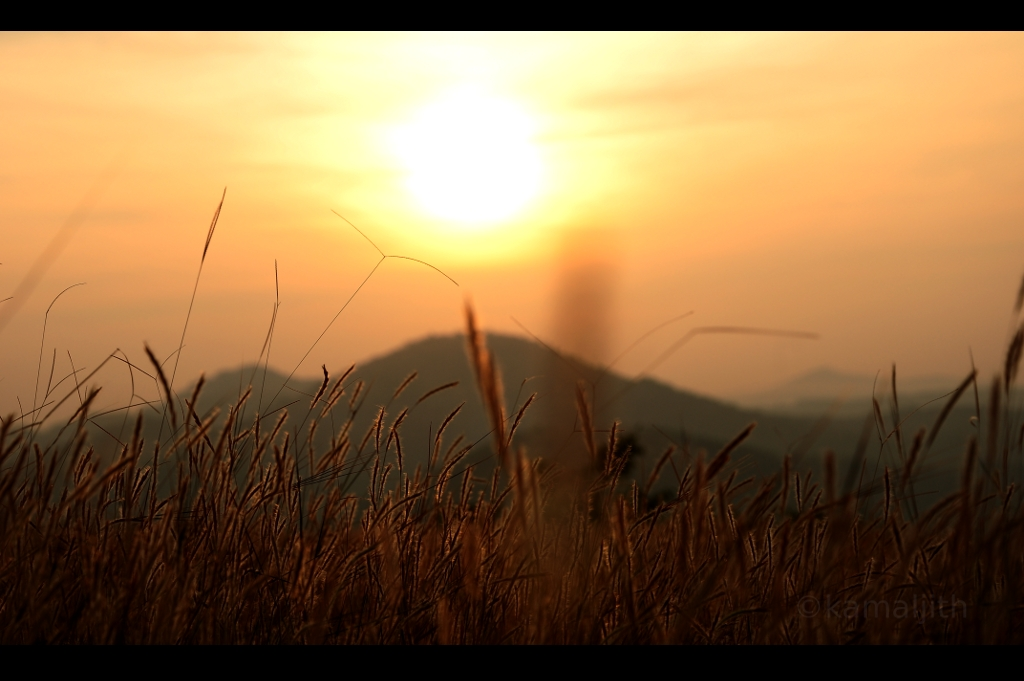
- A Dawn at Vazhayur

- Location in Kerala, India Vazhayur (India)
- Coordinates: 11°13′0″N 75°54′30″E
- Country: India
- State: Kerala
- District: Malappuram

Population (2011)
  - Total: 36,909

Languages
  - Official: Malayalam, English
- Time zone: UTC+5:30 (IST)
- PIN: 673633
- Vehicle registration: KL 10

Vazhayur is a census town in Malappuram in the state of Kerala, India. The Vazhayur Census Town has a population of 36,909, of which 18,163 are males and 18,746 are females, as per the report released by Census India 2011. The 2018 Malayalam film, Sudani from Nigeria, was shot in Vazhayur. The town forms a portion of the Malappuram metropolitan area.

The population of children aged 0 to 6 is 4306, accounting for 11.67% of the total population of Vazhayur (CT). In Vazhayur Census Town, the female sex ratio is 1032, compared to the state average of 1084. Furthermore, the child sex ratio in Vazhayur is approximately 958, compared to the Kerala state average of 964. The literacy rate in Vazhayur city is 95.79% higher than the state average of 94.00%. In Vazhayur, male literacy is approximately 97.44%, while female literacy is 94.19%.

Vazhayur Census Town administers a total of 7,883 dwellings and provides basic utilities like as water and sewerage. It is also authorised to construct roads within Census Town boundaries and levy taxes on properties falling under its control.

== Prominent Organizations ==
- SAFI Institute of Advanced Study
- Farook College
- PMSAPT Higher Secondary School
- Vedavyasa Institute of Technology
- Horizon international School
- Alfarook College, Feroke

== Proposed Karipur-Kondotty Municipality ==
The proposed Karipur-Kondotty Municipality comprises:

- Kondotty panchayat (villages of Kondotty, and part of Karipur)
- Nediyiruppu panchayat (villages of Nediyiruppu, and part of Karipur)
- Pallikkal panchayat (villages of Pallikkal, and part of Karipur)
- Pulikkal panchayat
- Cherukavu panchayat
- Vazhayur panchayat

Total Area: 122.99 km^{2}

== Demographics ==
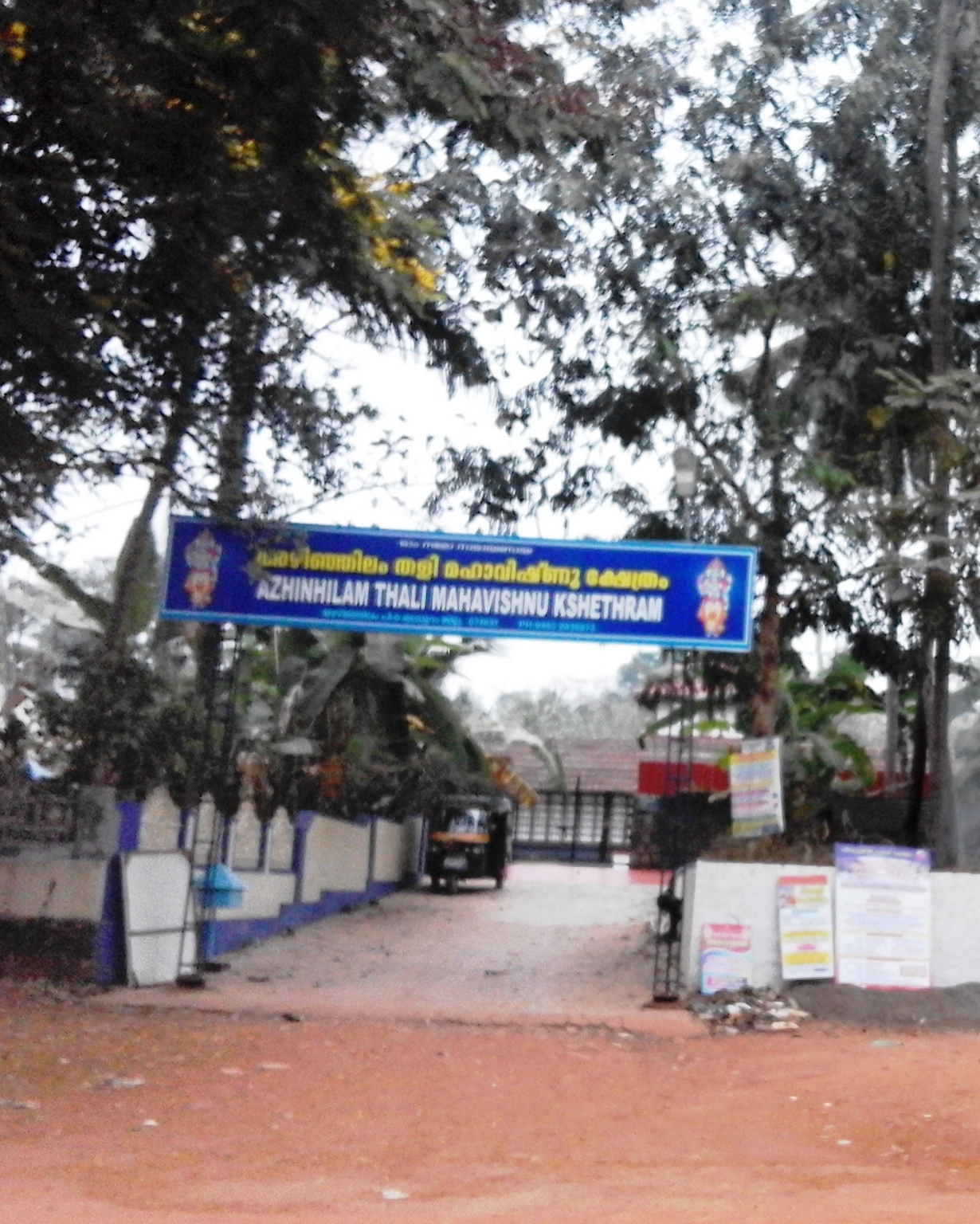
Azhinjilam Thali Maha Vishnu Temple, Ramanattukara

Vazhayur panchayat population
Year	Pop.	±%
1991	22,948	—
2001	32,486	+41.6%
2011	36,909	+13.6%
Source: Census of India

As of 2011 India census, Vazhayur had a population of 36909 with 18163 males and 18746 females.

== Transportation ==
Vazhayur village connects to other parts of India through Calicut town on the west and Nilambur town on the east. National highway No.66 passes through Azhinjilam Junction and the northern stretch connects to Goa and Mumbai. The southern stretch connects to Cochin and Trivandrum. State Highway No.28 starts from Nilambur and connects to Ooty, Mysore and Bangalore through Highways.12,29 and 181. The nearest airport is at Kozhikode. The nearest major railway station is at Feroke.

== Suburbs and Villages ==
- Vazhayur Town, Karad, Kottupadam, Kakkov, Puchapadam and Channayilpalliyali
- Akode, Virippadam and Oorkkadavu
- Korappadam, Mundumuzhi and Vazhakkad
- Valillappuzha and Edavannappara
