= Muthuvallur =

Muthuvallure
- village
- Location in Kerala, India Muthuvallure (India)
- Coordinates: 11°10′40″N 75°58′10″E
- Country: India
- State: Kerala
- District: Malappuram

Population (2011)
  - Total: 36,482

Languages
  - Official: Malayalam, English
- Time zone: UTC+5:30 (IST)
- PIN: 673 638
- Vehicle registration: KL-80 (KONDOTTY)

Muthuvallur is a gramapanchayat in Malappuram district in the state of Kerala, India. This panchayat is detached from Cheekkode gramapanchayat.

== Location ==
Muthuvallur is located on the north of Kondotty town. it is on the main road from Kondotty to Edavannappara.

== Suburbs and Villages ==
- Mundilakkal
- Mundakkulam
- Maneeri
- Vilayil
- Muthuvallur
- Muthuparamba
- Parathakkad
- Moochikkal
- West Moochikkal
- Vettukad
- Kangadi
- Chemmalaparamba
- Chullikkode

== Demographics ==
As of 2011 India census, Muthuvallur had a population of 36482 with 17931 males and 18551 females.

== Transportation ==
Muthuvallur village connects to other parts of India through Feroke town on the west and Nilambur town on the east. National highway No.66 passes through Pulikkal and the northern stretch connects to Goa and Mumbai. The southern stretch connects to Cochin and Trivandrum. State Highway No.28 starts from Nilambur and connects to Ooty, Mysore and Bangalore through Highways.12,29 and 181. The nearest airport is at Kozhikode. The nearest major railway station is at Feroke.
