= Kuzhimanna Gramapanchayat =

- village
- Interactive map of Kuzhimanna Gramapanchayat
- Location in Kerala, India Kuzhimanna Gramapanchayat (India)
- Coordinates: 11.176218°N 76.005381°E
- Country: India
- State: Kerala
- District: Malappuram

Government
  - Type: Gram panchayat

Population (2011)
  - Total: 34,413

Languages
  - Official: Malayalam, English
- Time zone: UTC+5:30 (IST)
- PIN: 673641
- Vehicle registration: KL- 84 Kondotty

Kuzhimanna Gramapanchayat is a Gramapanchayat located in Areecode Block Panchayat in Kondotty Taluk, The area of Kuzhimanna Gramapanchayat is 20.05 square kilometer. There is 18 wards in this panchayat. This panchayat was formed in 1961. Kuzhimanna Gramapanchayat is a town near Kondotty in Malappuram district in the state of Kerala, India.

== Location ==
The town of Kizhisseri is located in the middle of the main road from Kondotty to Areacode. Kuzhimanna is the formal name of the village.

== Demographics ==
As of 2011 India census, Kuzhimanna had a population of 34413 with 16879 males and 17534 females.

== Suburbs and Villages ==
- Kaloth Hills
- Onnam Mile
- Ekkaparamba
- Valappan Kundu
- Alinchuvadu
- Balathil Puraya
- Neeruttikkal
- Munduparamba Hills
- Kanchiramoochy Hills
- Hajiyapadi
- Muthuvalloor
- Kadungalloor
- Kalathingalpara
- Velleri
- Chemrakkattoor
- Pookkattuchola
- Alattippara
- Kozhakkottoor
- Kannarath
- Chullikkode
- Kuzhiyamparamba

== Important Landmarks ==
- Alabeer Hospital, Kizhisseri
- Bukhari Madrassa, Kaloth
- Sabihul Hudha Madrassa, Onnam Mile
- Irshadu SAbyan Masjidh, Ekkaparamba
- Markkasussalam Madrassa, Ekkaparamba
- Hidayath Madrassa, Valappan Kundu
- Ganapath School, Kizhisseri
- Ragam Cinema, Kizhisseri
- Chinese Chantha, Kizhisseri
- Nellikkunnu Harijan Colony
- Harithagiri Regional College
- Old metal bridge, Kadungalloor
- Shankara Narayana Temple, Kadungalloor
- MMH Melmury
- Friends Arts and Sports Club
- Kizhisseri Development Society, KDS
- Kuzhimanna Youth Club, KYC
- Badar Masjid
- Manshaussaada Madrassa
- Gov:Higher Secondary School Kuzhimanna
- Gov:Higher Secondary School Chullikkode
- Al Ansar Orphanage
- Izzath Izlamic Complex
- Secure steel doors and windows, Cheruparambu
- Melepurakkal Hospital, Kadungallur
- Govt.UP School, Kadungallur
- Kadungallur Youth Cultural Club (KYCC)
- GLP School Kuzhiyamparamba
- Hayathul Islam Madrassa Kuzhiyam Paramba
- Cheniyan Kunnu Kuzhiyamparamba

== Transportation ==
Kuzhimanna village connects to other parts of India through Feroke town on the west and Nilambur town on the east. National highway No.66 passes through Pulikkal and the northern stretch connects to Goa and Mumbai. The southern stretch connects to Cochin and Trivandrum. State Highway No.28 starts from Nilambur and connects to Ooty, Mysore and Bangalore through Highways.12,29 and 181. The nearest airport is at Kozhikode. The nearest major railway station is at Feroke.
