= Cherukavu =

Cherukavu Ayikkarappadi
- Grama panchayat
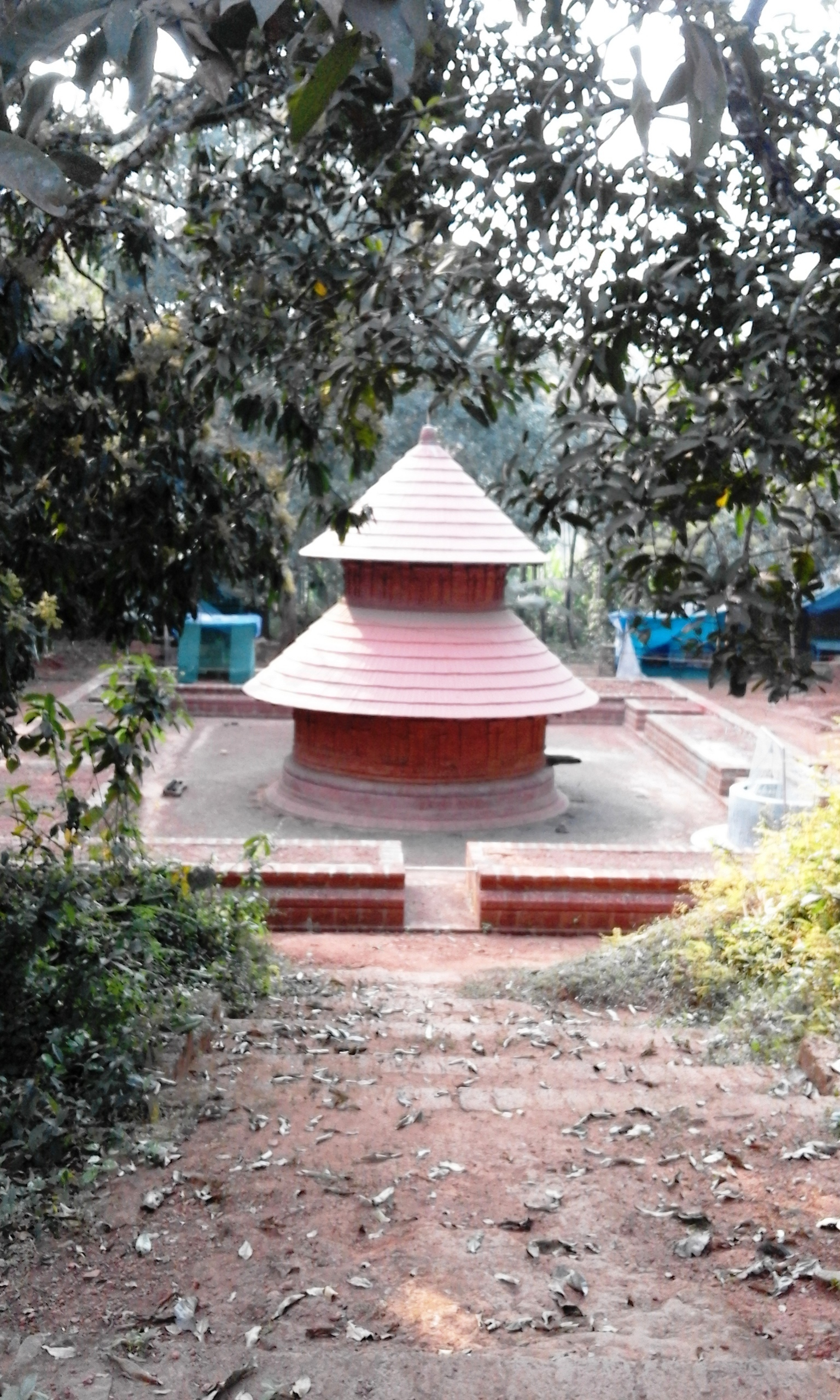
- Nechiyil Narasimha Temple

- Location in Kerala, India Cherukavu (India)
- Coordinates: 11.188140°N 75.917340°E
- Country: India
- State: Kerala
- District: Malappuram
- Taluk: Kondotty
- Block panchayat: Kondotty
- Revenue division: Tirur
- Established: 1964

Government
  - Type: Grama Panchayat
  - Body: Cherukavu Grama panchayat

Area
  - Total: 16.87 km^{2} (6.51 sq mi)

Population (2011)
  - Total: 30,126
  - Density: 2,180/km^{2} (5,600/sq mi)

Languages
  - Official: Malayalam, English
- Time zone: UTC+5:30 (IST)
- PIN: 673637
- Telephone code: 0483
- Vehicle registration: KL-84
- Nearest city: Kozhikode
- Lok Sabha constituency: Malappuram
- Vidhan Sabha constituency: Kondotty
- Nearest Towns: Feroke (9km), Kondotty (9 km), Ramanattukara (4.5 km)

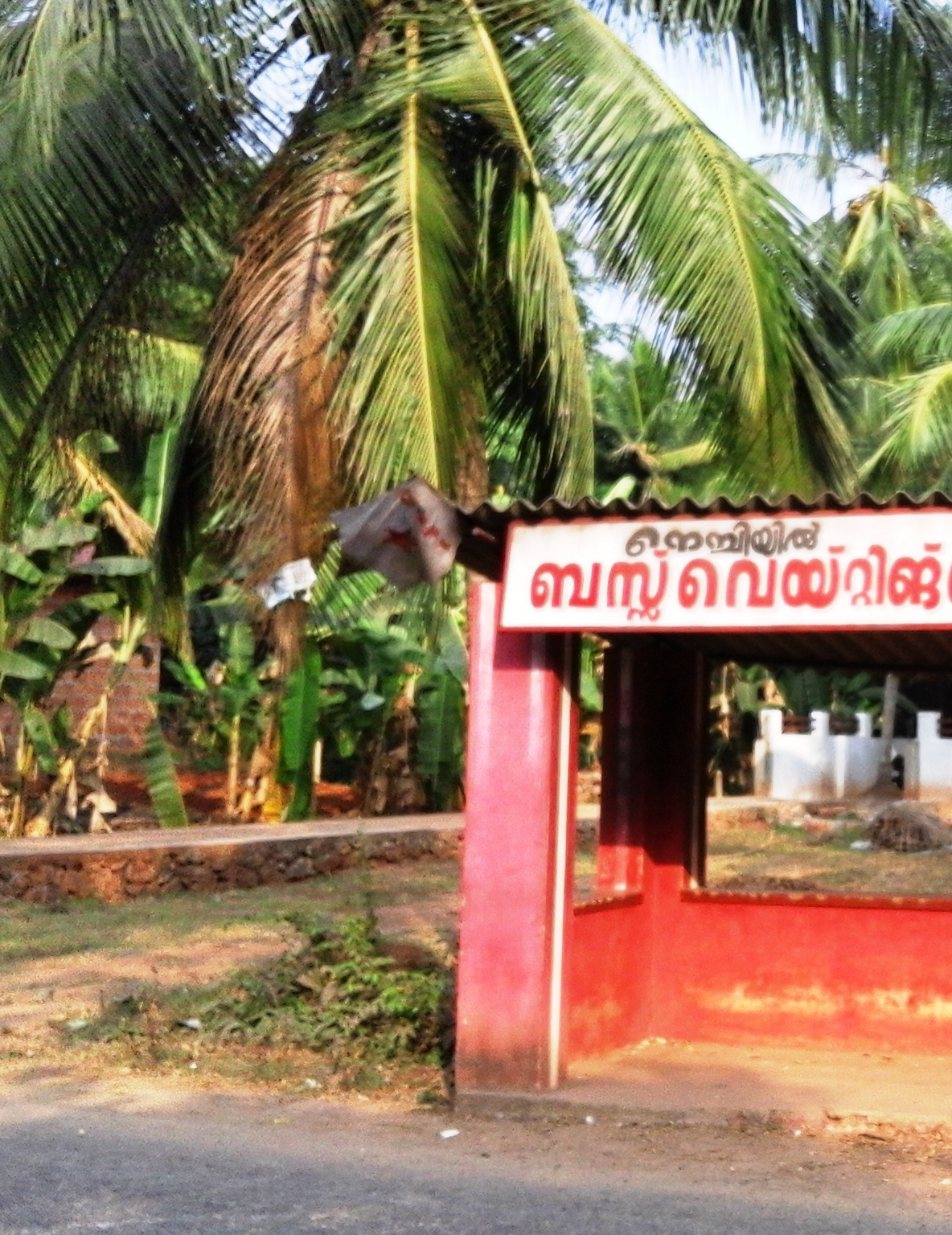
Cherappadam Bus Waiting Shed

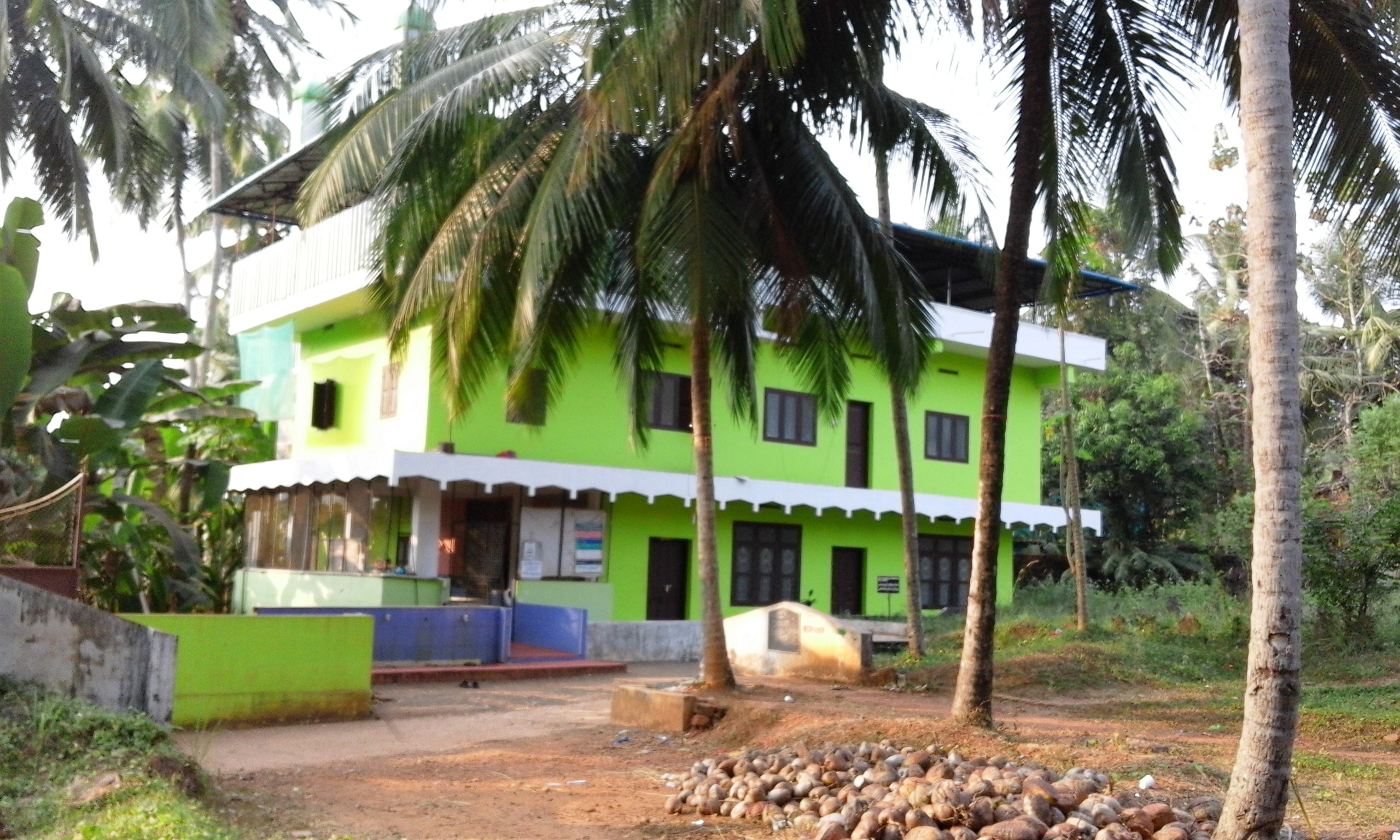
Kannamvettikkavu Juma Masjid

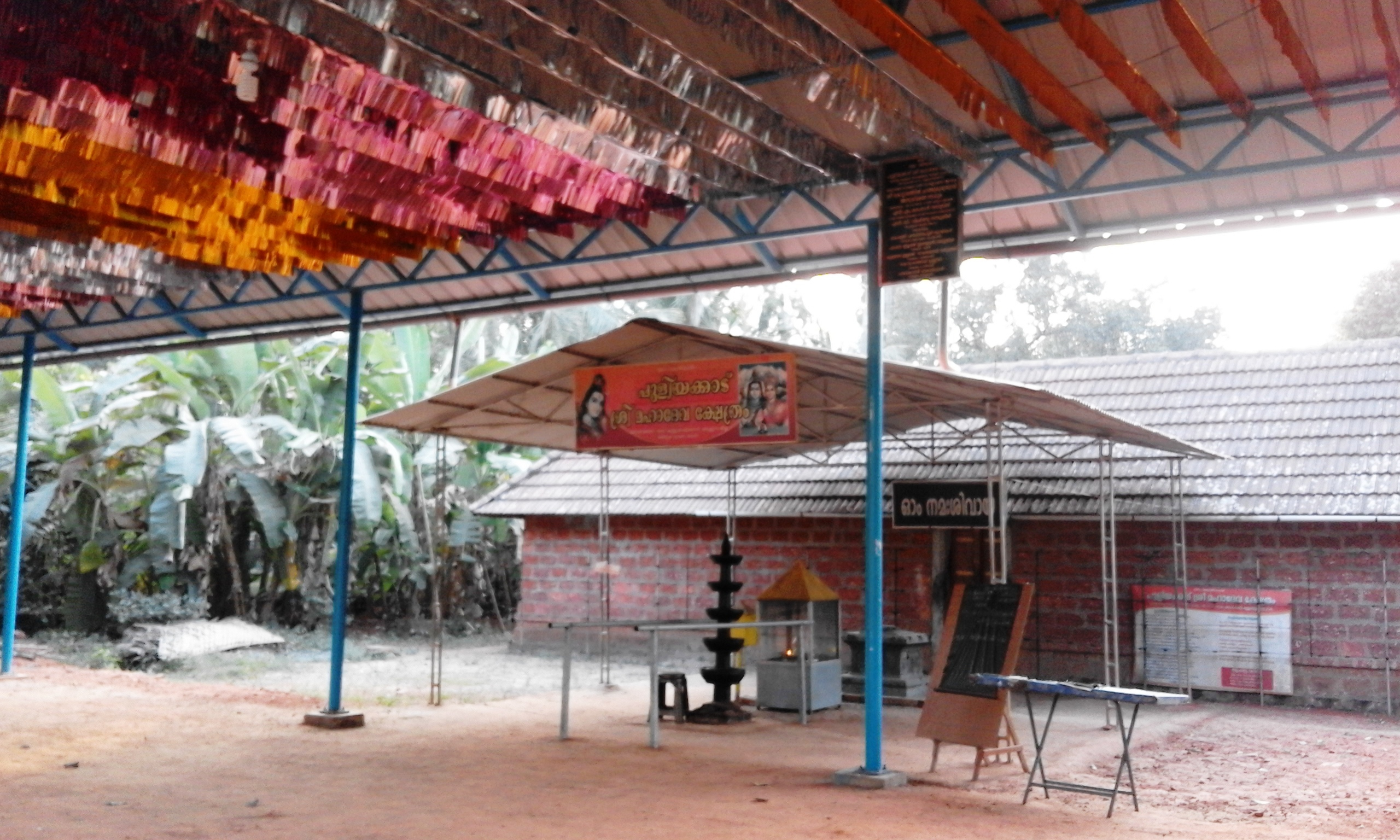
Puliyakkad Mahadeva Temple

Cherukavu is a census town in Malappuram district in the state of Kerala. Cherukav panchayath shares its borders with Ramanattukara municipality, Pulikkal panchayath, Vazhayur panchayath pallikkal panchayat and Chelembra panchayat.

== History ==
Cherukav Gramapanchayath was formed in 1964

== Demographics ==
Cherukavu panchayat population
Year	Pop.	±%
1971	10,480	—
1981	19,217	+83.4%
1991	25,322	+31.8%
2001	30,875	+21.9%
2011	36,773	+19.1%
Source: Census of India

Cherukavu Grama panchayath (2180) has the Highest density in Kondotty taluk followed by chelembra Grama panchayat (2146) & Kondotty Municipality (1908).

As of 2011 India census, Cherukavu census Town had a population of 30126 with 14778 males and 15348 females.

== Wards ==
For administrative convenience, Cherukavu Gramapanchayat is divided into 22 wards after delimitation 2025.

Ward no.	Ward name	Ward no.	Ward name
1	Dhanagram	12	Chamaparamb
2	Peringavu	13	Kuvayil moola(New)
3	Kodappuram	14	Siyamkandam
4	Cholakkode(New)	15	Puthoopadam
5	Cherapadam	16	Kuriyedam(New)
6	Kannamvettikavu	17	Vennayoor
7	Chenaparamb	18	Ayikkarappadi
8	Paravoor	19	kaithakunda
9	Periyambalam	20	Poochal
10	Chevayoor	21	Pengad
11	Mini estate	22	Puthukkode

== Election results ==
Cherukavu Panchayath till 2020 consists of 19 wards, after delimitation 2025 it is increased to 22 wards

=== Political Performance in Election 2025 ===
Panchayath election
- 11 December 2025

All 22 councils in the Cherukavu Gramapanchayath 12 seats needed for a majority
- Turnout: 77.90%
	First party	Second party	Third party
Party	INC	CPI(M)	BJP
Alliance	UDF	LDF	NDA
Last election	10	8	1
Seats won	15	6	1
Seat change	5▲	2▼	0
Popular vote	12,033	9,951	3,488
Percentage	46.18%	38.19%	13.38%
Panchayat President before election
Abdulla Kkoya
IUML
Elected Panchayat President
Jaseena Alungal
IUML

=== Political Performance in Election 2020 ===
S.No.	Party name	Party symbol	Number of members
01	LDF		4
02	UDF		10
03	BJP		1
04	Independents		4

=== 2015 Cherukavu Gramapanchayat Elections ===
S.No.	Political Front/Party	Number of Members
1	United Democratic Front (UDF)	10
2	Left Democratic Front (LDF)	6
3	National Democratic Alliance (NDA)	1
4	Others	2
Total		19

=== 2010 Cherukavu Gramapanchayat Elections ===
S.No.	Political Front/Party	Number of Members
1	United Democratic Front (UDF)	13
2	Left Democratic Front (LDF)	5
3	National Democratic Alliance (NDA)	0
4	Others	1
Total		19

== Transportation ==
Some parts of Cherukavu panchayath lie on the National Highway 966 between Ramanattukara and Kondotty. Most parts of Pulikkal town comes under Cherukavu panchayath. Other important towns of Cherukavu panchayath are Peringave and Kannamvettikkavu. Buses ply from Ramanattukara town to K.V.Kavu regularly and they stop in Peringave on the way for five minutes. The road to Peringave starts from Kaithakkundu on the National Highway 966 and passes through Poochal village.

== Pulikkal town ==
The biggest town in the Cherukavu Panchayat area is Pulikkal. There is another panchayat called 'Pulikkal' in the neighborhood. Locals use these two place names ambiguously. The word 'Pulikkal' refers to the bus stop and town. The bureaucracy uses the word 'Cherukavu.'

== Proposed Karipur-Kondotty Municipality ==
The proposed Karipur-Kondotty Municipality comprises:

- Kondotty panchayat (villages of Kondotty, and part of Karipur)
- Nediyiruppu panchayat (villages of Nediyiruppu, and part of Karipur)
- Pallikkal panchayat (villages of Pallikkal, and part of Karipur)
- Pulikkal panchayat
- Cherukavu panchayat
- Vazhayur panchayat

Total Area: 122.99 km^{2}

Total Population (1991 Census): 152,839

== Peringave Town ==
Peringave is a small town in Malappuram district, Kerala, India. It is 22 km away from Calicut. The nearest city is Ramanattukara and is less than an hour away from Calicut International Airport. Ramapuram Lakshmi Narayana kshethram is one of the main temples in peringave. There are two masjid in peringave ( Salafi Masjid, Peringave and Juma masjid, Peringave ) . Bus and taxi is the way to reach peringave. Bus facilities are available from calicut and ramanattukara. Kottu padam, vazhayur Pengad etc. are the neighbouring villages.

== Kannamvettikkavu ==
Kannam-Vetti-Kavu' is a small town in Cherukavu Panchayath. It is 4.7 km from Peringave town. The town is famous for the ancient Puliyakkad Mahadeva Temple and the new Cherappadam Temple. The old Juma Masjidh at Cholakkode is set in a scenic paddy field surroundings with a Tribal Colony around it.

== Important Landmarks ==
- AMLP SCHOOL, PUTHOOPADAM
- PUTHOOPADAM JUMUA MASJID
- MADRASATHUL RAHMANIYYA
- VALANIMOOLA ANGANAVADI
- ALPS Cherukavu, Siyamkandam
- Vennayur AUPB School, Ayikkarappadi
- RHSS Ramanattukara
- Ayikkarappadi Badar Juma masjid
- Ayikkarappadi Salafi Masjid
- Puthalam Juma Masjid
- Salafi Madrassa, Kuvayilmoola
- Manshaul Uloom Madrassah, Poochal
- Lakshmi Narayana Temple, Peringavu
- Salafi Masjidh, Perngavu Junction
- Mahadeva Temple, Puliyakkad
- Abdullakutty Library
- K.V.Kavu School
- Busthanool Uloom Madrassah
- Mahavishnu Temple, Poochal
- Pengad juma masjid

== Transportation ==
Cherukavu village connects to other parts of India through Feroke town on the west and Nilambur town on the east. National highway No.66 passes through Pulikkal and the northern stretch connects to Goa and Mumbai. The southern stretch connects to Cochin and Trivandrum. State Highway No.28 starts from Nilambur and connects to Ooty, Mysore and Bangalore through Highways.12,29 and 181. The nearest airport is at Kozhikode. The nearest major railway station is at Feroke.

== See also ==
- Aikkarappadi
- Feroke
- Ramanattukara
- Kondotty
- pallikkal
- idimuzhikkal
- Vazhayur
