= Aikkarappadi =

Coordinates: 11°11′11″N 75°54′23″E

- Town
- Interactive map of Aikkarappadi
- Country: India
- States of India: Kerala
- Districts of Kerala: Malappuram district
- Village: Cherukavu
- PIN: 673637

Aikkarappadi (also known as Ayikkarappadi) is a town in the Malappuram district in Kerala, India. Agriculture and education are its main industries.

Aikkarappadi is the main and center town of the Cherukavu village.

== Location ==
Aikkarappadi is located between the cities of Kozhikode (20 kilometres (12 mi)), Kondotty (9 kilometres (5.6 mi)), Malappuram (30 kilometres (19 mi)), and Ramanattukara (2.5 kilometres (1.6 mi)). Calicut/Kozhikode Airport 8 km.calicut university 6 km.kozhikode medical college 16km. An old traditional family named aykkara became the name of this town.

== Agriculture ==
Aikkarappadi is home to farms producing rice, bananas, pepper, arecanut, tapioca and coconuts, among others.

== Religions ==
Aikkarappadi's residents include Hindus, Muslims and Christians.

=== Worship centers ===
- Badar Masjid
- Masjid-ul Furqaan
- Sri Puvvakkatt Siva temple
- Juma Masjid Puthoopadam
- salafi masjid ottupara
- kalari temple കുറിയേടം ottupara

== Education ==
- Vennayoor AUPBS Aikkarappadi
- AMLP School Puthoopadam Aikkarappadi
- Markaz Public School CBSE Aikkarappadi
- School of Commerce and Management Aikkarappadi
- Bharath College Aikkarappadi.
- Badariyya English Medium School Aikkarappadi.
- BTMAMUP School pengad cherukavu

== Government facilities ==
- Krishi Bhavan Cherukavu village Aikkarappadi
- Veterinary dispensary Aikkarappadi
- Govt. Ayurveda dispensary Aikkarappadi
- Post office Aikkarappadi
- Mini Stadium Aikkarappadi
- Kinfra Park 2 km, Kakkanchery.
- Akshaya center Aikkarappadi

== Transportation ==
- Calicut International Airport 8 km
- Calicut Railway Station 20 km
- Feroke Railway Station 8 km
- Beypore Port 13 km

=== Important roads ===
- Palakkad-Malappuram-Kondotty-Aikkarappadi-Ramanattukara-Kozhikkod, NH Palakkad-Kozhikkode
- Aikkarappadi-Kakkanchery(NH Thrissur-Kozhikkod)
- Aikkarappadi-Puthoopadam-KV Kavu-Aroor
- Aikkarappadi-Aroor (bus service available)
- Aikkarappadi-Chakkamattukunnu, Kaithakkunu

== Major industries ==
- Zahi Rubbers India Pvt ltd
- Pepsi (old) company

=== Banking ===
- SBT Aikkarappadi
- Cherukavu Vanitha Sahakarana Sankham Bank
- Malappuram District cooperative Bank
- Karshika Grama vikasana bank Aikkarappadi
- Muthoot Fincorp Aikkarappadi

== Major political parties ==
- CPIM (opposition)
- IUML (Ruling the panchayath)
- Bhartiya Janata Party (BJP)
- Indian National Congress (INC)
- Welfare Party
- PDP
- BSP
