= Perumugham =

- Village
- Interactive map of Perumugham
- Coordinates: 11.16826°N 75.85422°E
- Country: India
- State: Kerala
- District: Kozhikode

Perumugham is a small village near Feroke in Kozhikode District, Kerala, India.

== Administration ==
Perumugham and Pullikkadavu are part of Feroke Municipality in Kozhikode District.

== Transportation ==
Perumugham is connected to Feroke and Ramanattukara by road. The nearest railway station is Ferok. Calicut Airport is 14 kilometres (8.7 mi) away.

== Villages and suburbs ==
- Karaliparamb
- Olippilpara
- Kallikkoodam
- Vadakkey Bazar
- Kalluvalappu
- Pullikkadavu

== Landmarks ==
- Pullippuzha
- Ennakkad Juma Masjid
- Thulissery Shri Ayyappa Temple, Kallikkoodam
- Malakkav Bhagavathi Temple
- Malayil Mahakali Temple
- TP Muhammed Kutty vayanashala

== Festivals ==
- Malayil Mahakali Temple, Pullikkadavu conducts an annual festival which attracts many devotees from nearby villages.
- Marhoom Zainudheen Musliyar Uroos
