= P. Abdul Hameed =

Indian politician

P. Abdul Hameed MLA

Member of the Kerala Legislative Assembly
- Constituency: Vallikunnu

Personal details
- Party: Indian Union Muslim League

P. Abdul Hameed (Puliyakkuth Abdul Hameed) is an Indian politician and the current MLA of Vallikunnu, Kerala. He is a senior politician from Pattikkad, near Perinthalmanna. Currently he is the General Secretary of Indian Union Muslim League Malappuram District.
