= Pulikkal =

- Village
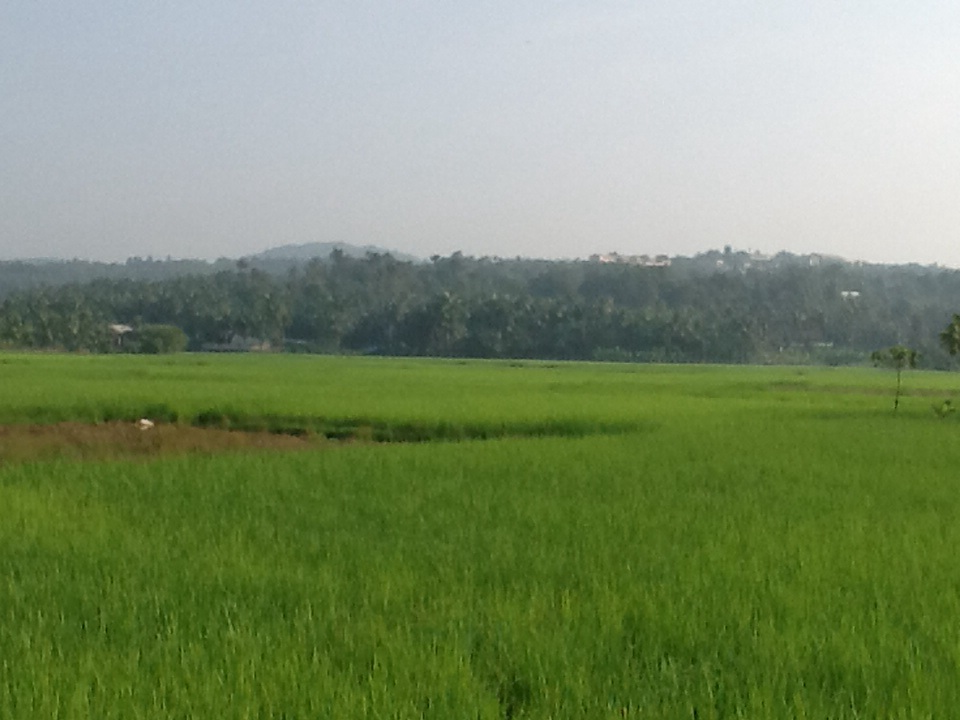
- Paddyfields in Pulikkal
- Country: India
- State: Kerala
- District: Malappuram

Population (2011)
  - Total: 40,133

Languages
  - Official: Malayalam, English
- Time zone: UTC+5:30 (IST)
- PIN: 673637
- Vehicle registration: KL-84

Pulikkal or Cherukavu is a village in Malappuram district in the state of Kerala, India. Pulikkal is often referred to as the "Land of Authentic Banana Chips"

== Proposed Karipur-Kondotty Municipality ==
The proposed Karipur-Kondotty Municipality comprises:

- Kondotty panchayat (villages of Kondotty, and part of Karipur)
- Nediyiruppu panchayat (villages of Nediyiruppu, and part of Karipur)
- Pallikkal panchayat (villages of Pallikkal, and part of Karipur)
- Pulikkal panchayat
- Cherukavu panchayat
- Vazhayur panchayat

Total Area: 122.99 km^{2}

Total Population (1991 Census): 152,839

== Demographics ==
As of 2011 India census, Pulikkal had a population of 40,133 with 19,695 males and 20,438 females.

Most parts of Pulikkal town fall under the jurisdiction of Cherukavu Panchayath administration. The word Pulikkal is used to refer to the town and the word Cherukavu is used only by the bureaucracy. The actual center of Cherukavu village is in Kannamvettikkavu, five kilometers away from Pulikkal town.

== Currency-less village ==
In 2016, Pulikkal was declared as one of the eight currency less villages of Kerala because of the complete acceptance of e-wallet, e-commerce and debit card based transactions. The government is giving training to the village people for using online financial transactions. The drive was especially significant in wake of the Government of India demonetization drive of 2016.

== Suburbs and villages ==
- Valiyaparamba
- Siyamkandam
- Periyambalam
- Andiyoorkunnu
- Alungal and Kottappuram
- Thalekkara and Neettanimmal

== Transportation ==
Pulikkal village connects to other parts of India through Feroke town on the west and Nilambur town on the east. National Highway 66 passes through Pulikkal and the northern stretch connects to Goa and Mumbai. The southern stretch connects to Cochin and Trivandrum. State Highway No.28 starts from Nilambur and connects to Ooty, Mysore and Bangalore through Highways.12,29 and 181. The nearest airport is at Kozhikode. The nearest major railway station is at Feroke.
