= Pallikkal Bazar =

Pallikkal Bazar Pallikkal
- Census town
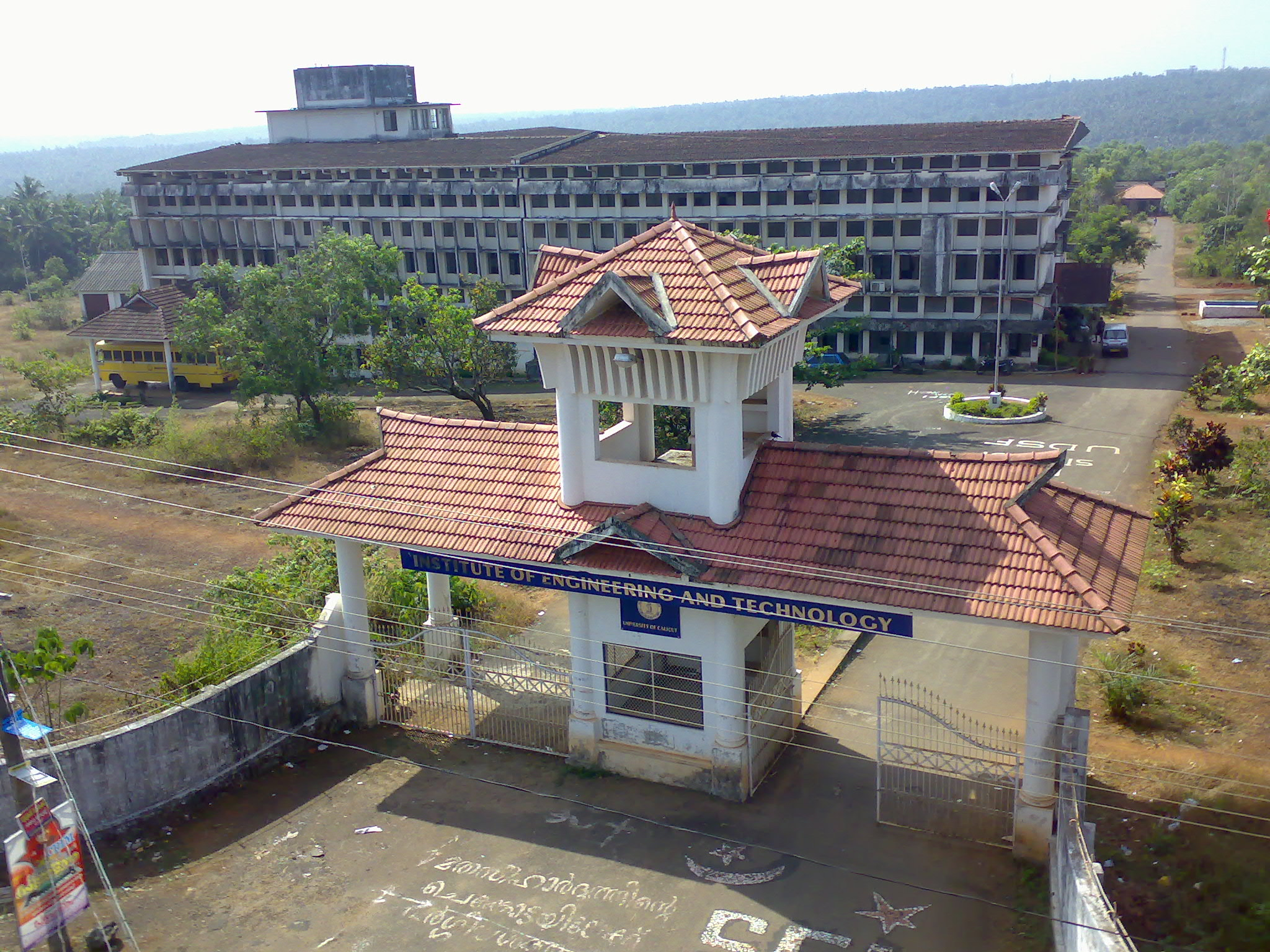
- University of Calicut

- Location in Kerala, India Pallikkal Bazar (India)
- Coordinates: 11°9′0″N 75°54′0″E
- Country: India
- State: Kerala
- District: Malappuram

Government
  - Type: Local
  - Body: Grama Panchayat

Population (2011)
  - Total: 46,962

Languages
  - Official: Malayalam, English
- Time zone: UTC+5:30 (IST)
- PIN: 673634, 673636
- Vehicle registration: KL-84
- Nearest city: Kozhikode
- Nearest major towns: Kondotty, Feroke
- Lok Sabha constituency: Malappuram
- Kerala Legislative Assembly Constituency: Vallikkunnu
- Taluk: Kondotty
- Telephone Code: 0483, 0494

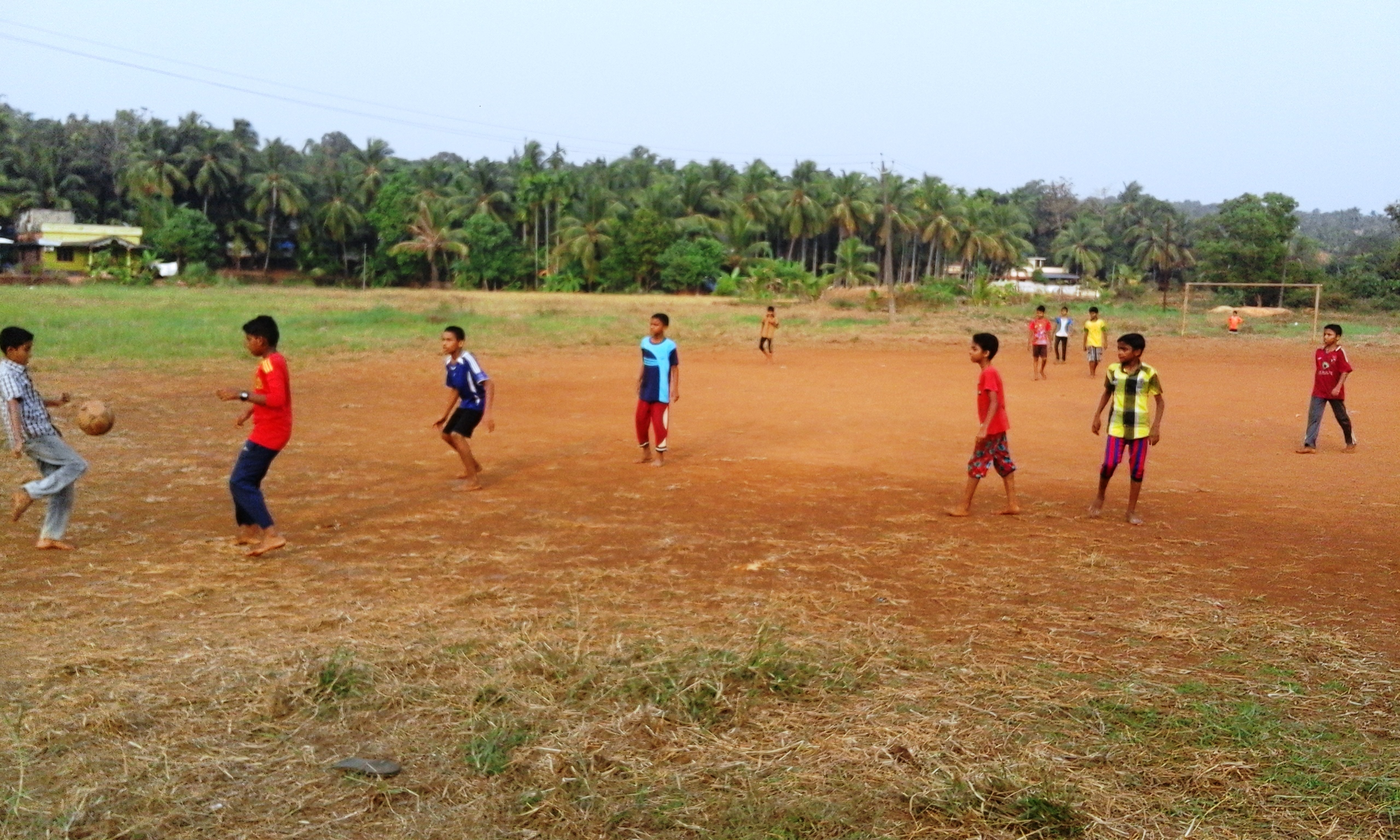
The children of Pallikkal Bazar

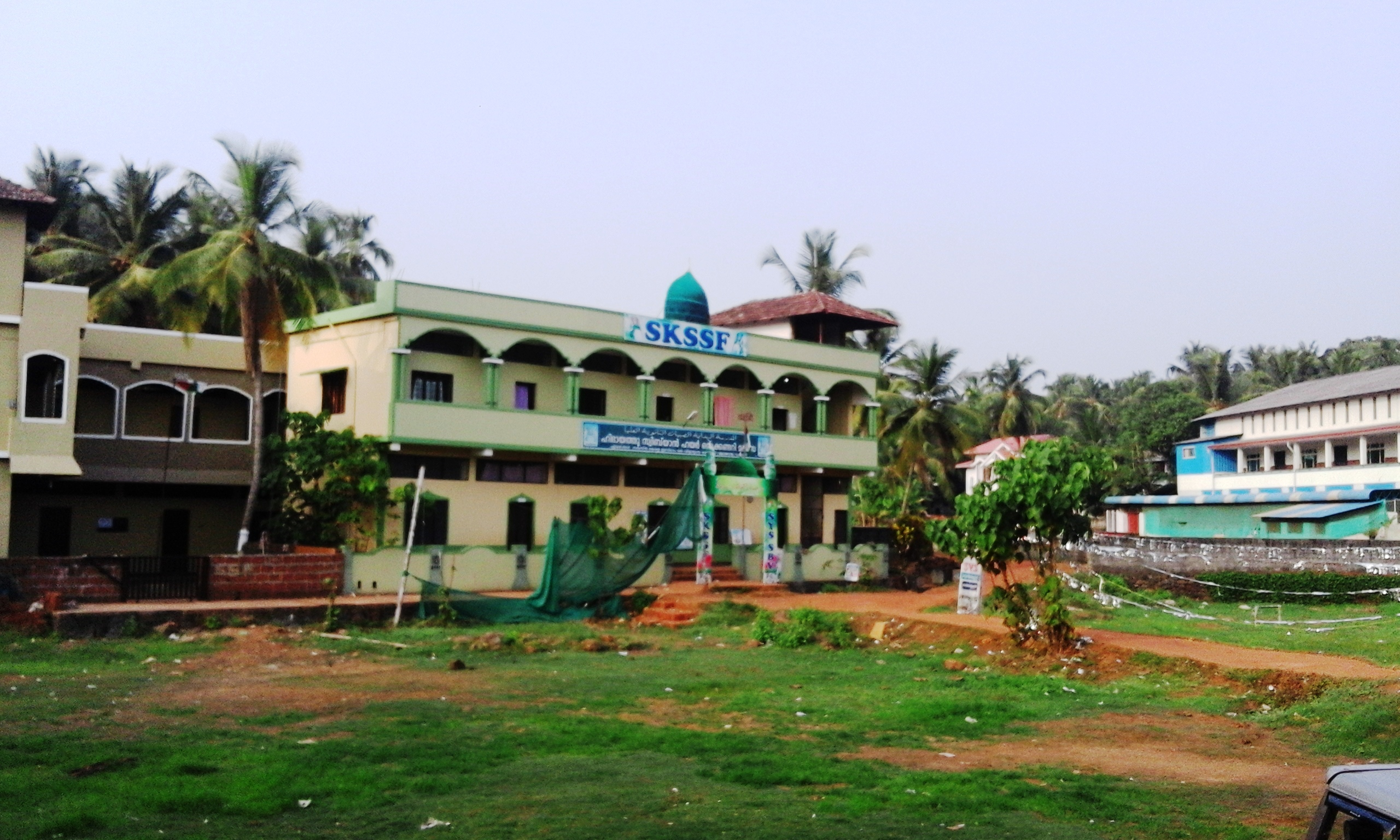
Sunni Madhrassah in Pallikkal Bazar T-junction

Pallikkal (Pallikkal Bazar) is a village and gram panchayat in Kondotty Taluk, Malappuram district in the state of Kerala, India.

Calicut International Airport at Karipur is near Pallikkal.

Pallikkal Bazar is located 5 km (3.1 mi) from the University of Calicut and from Kondotty.

Kerala’s first Akshaya center was started in Pallikal gram panchayat. AMLP School Pallikkal is in Pallikkal Bazar.

== Demographics ==
As of 2011 India census, Pallikkal had a population of 46962 with 23133 males and 23829 females.

== Landmarks ==
- Marketile Shihabikka
- Dragon kung fu dojo
- V mark supermarket
- Rasack building
- Pallikkal Bazar Masjid
- Shri Maha Ganapathy Temple
- AMUP School
- VPKMHS School
- Mareena Gold and Diamonds
- Shameem farish physiotherapist

== Suburbs and villages ==
- UKC, Kavumpadi
- Devathiyal, Puthur-Palikkal and Thottiyil
- Paruthikkode and Arakkott
- Kozhippuram, Pallikkal and College Road
- Ambalavalavu and Rottippeedika
- Koonulmad and Alparamb
- Karippur and Kumminiparamb

== Transportation ==
Calicut International Airport is located in Pallikkal panchayath and is situated around 7 km (4.3 mi) away from Pallikkal Bazar.

The nearest railway stations are at Feroke, Parappanangadi and Vallikunnu. The nearest major railway station at Kozhikode is 20 km (12 mi) away.

Pallikkal Bazar town and surrounding areas are also well connected by road and local bus transportation systems. National Highway 66 and National Highway 966 are 2.5 km (1.6 mi) and 3 km (1.9 mi) away respectively from Pallikkal Bazar. The town itself is located on Kakkanchery-Kottapuram road which is a major throughfare and also a major link between NH-66 and NH-966.

== Gallery ==
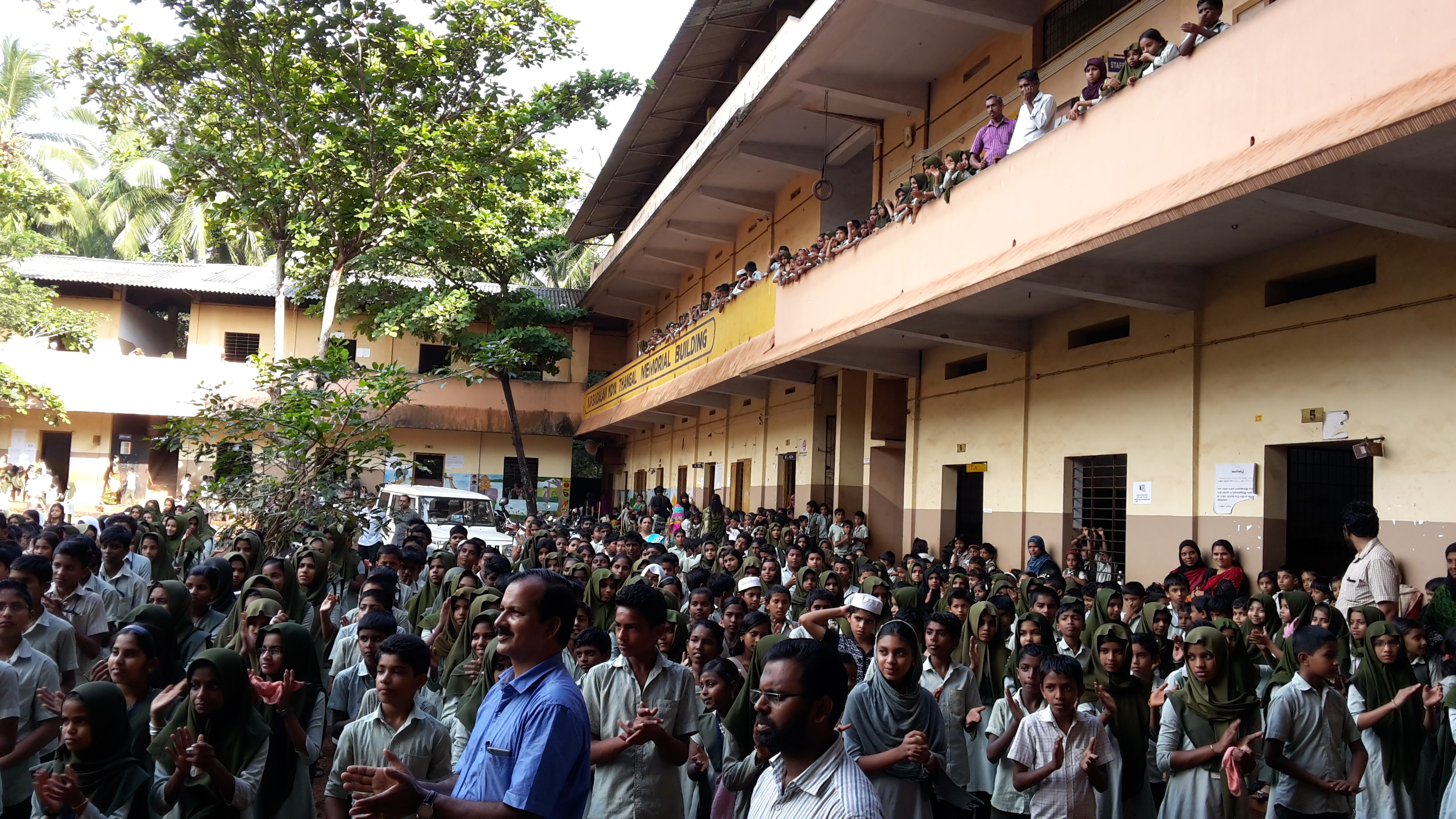
AMUPS school

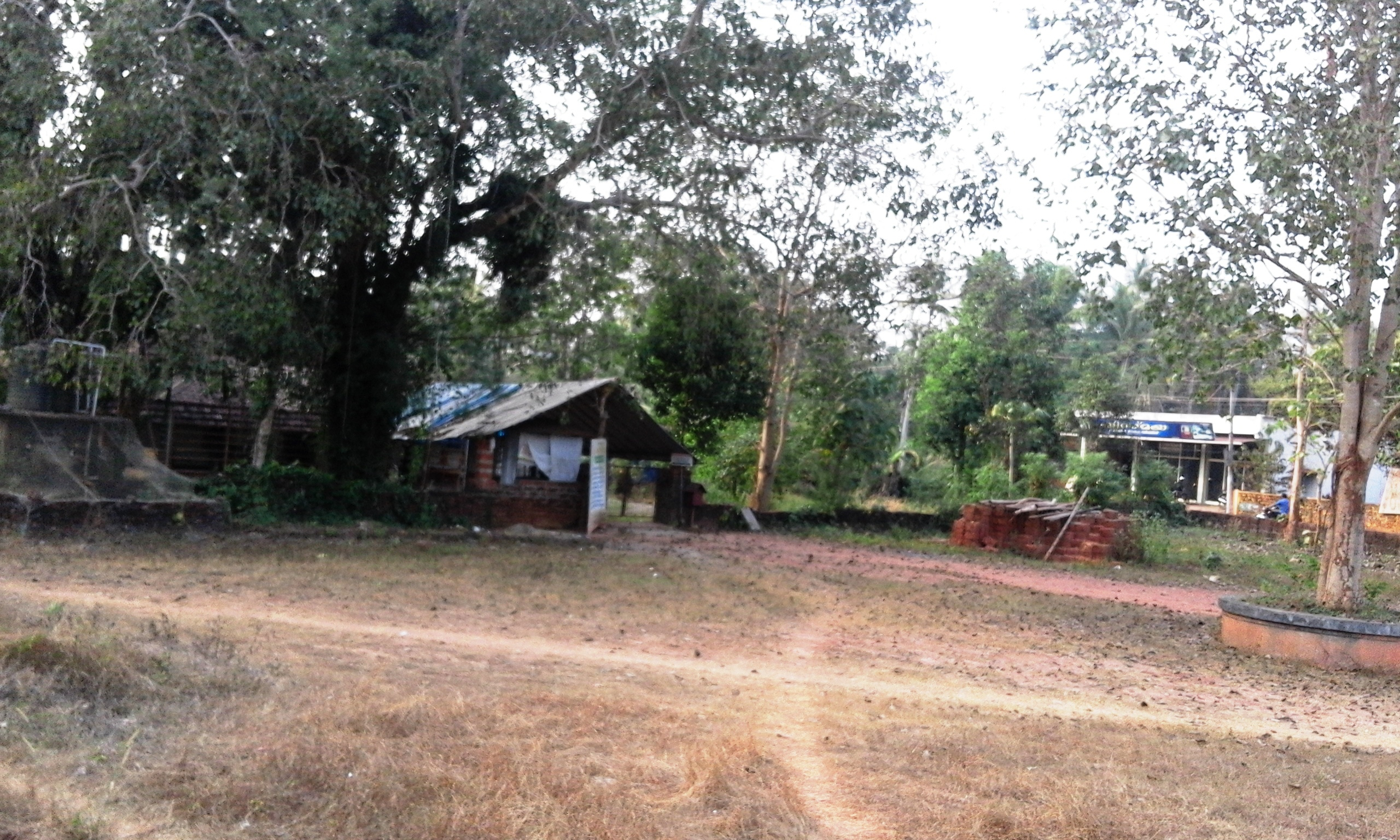
Pallikkal Kavu

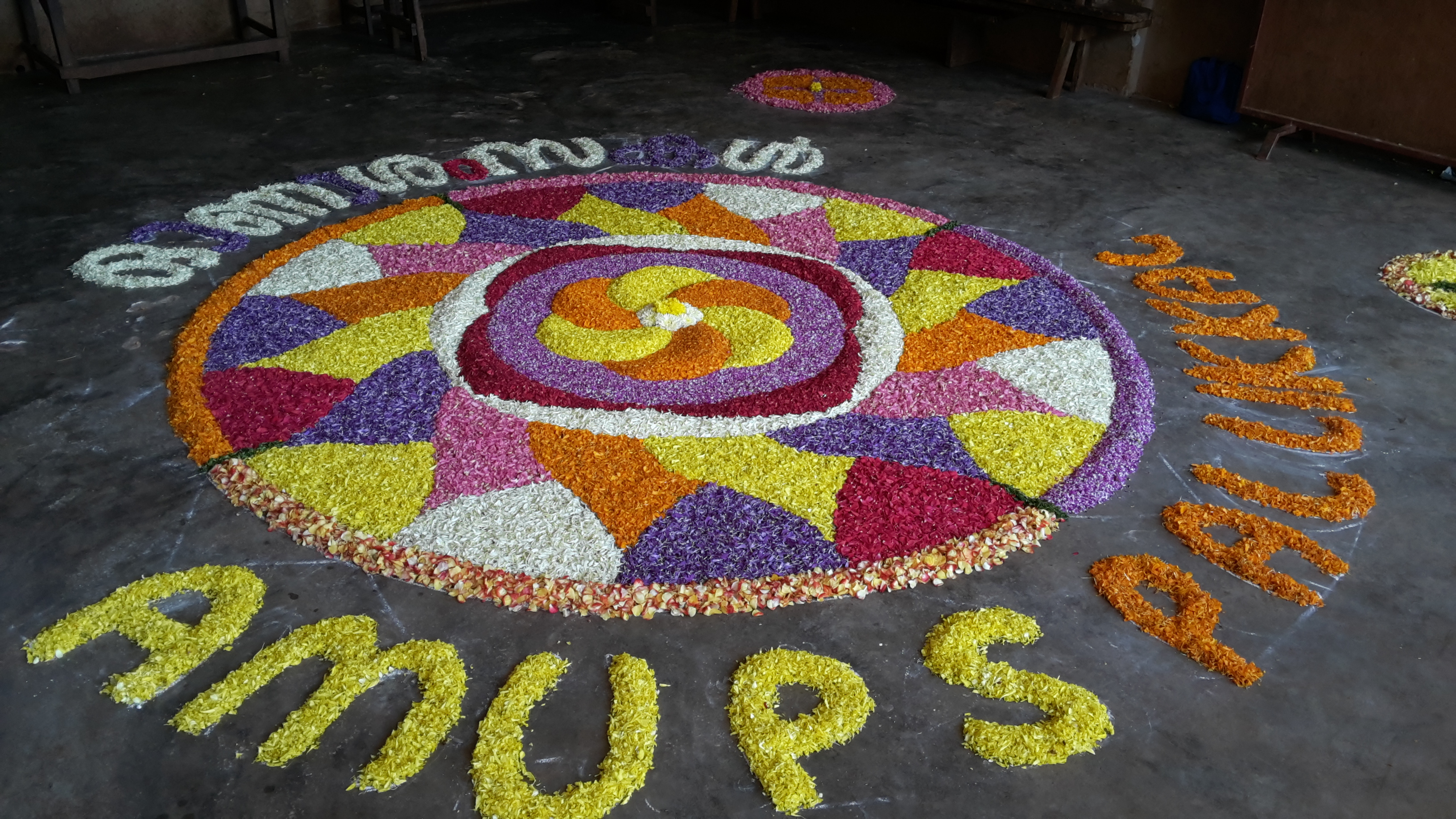
Onam Festival at AMUPS school

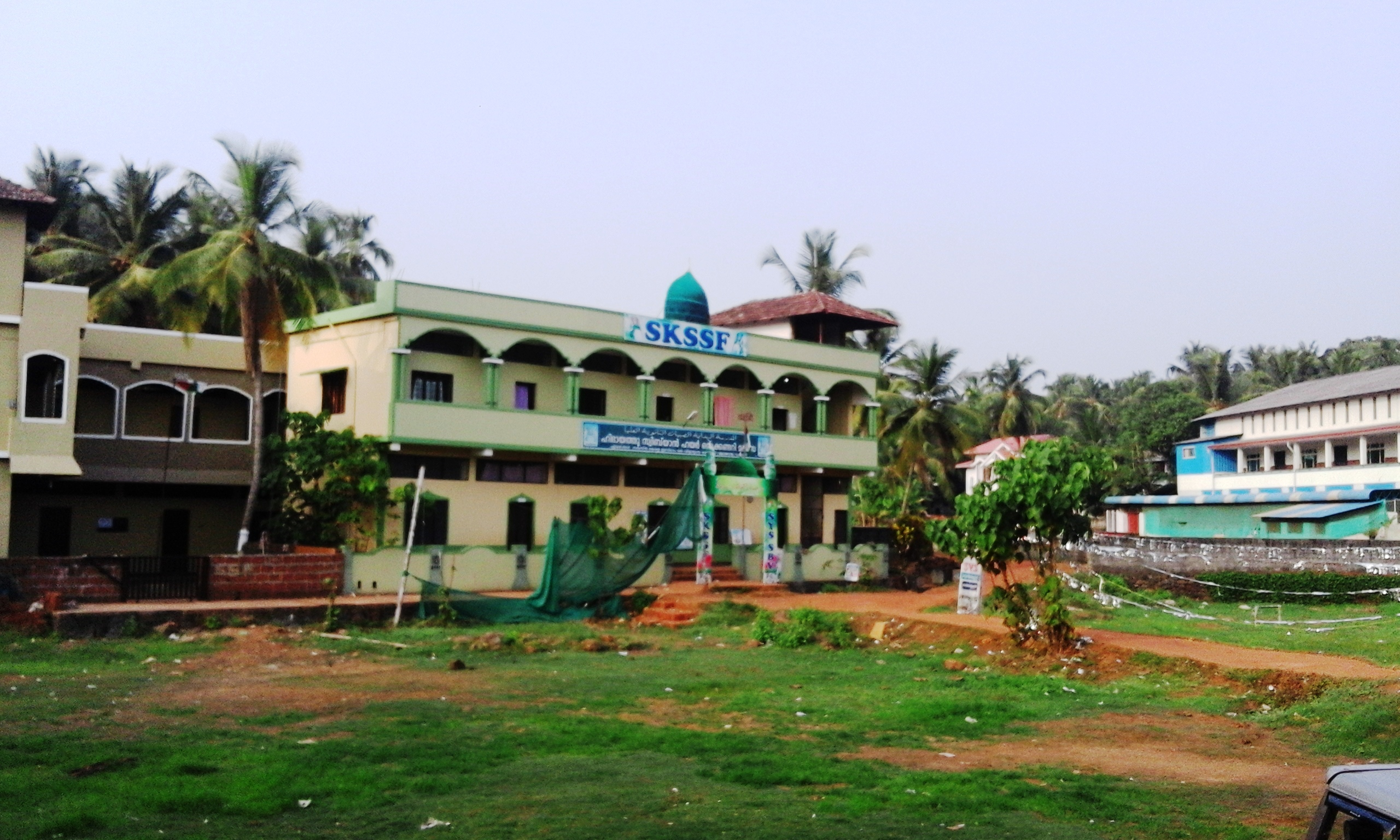
Hidayathu Sibyan Madhrassah

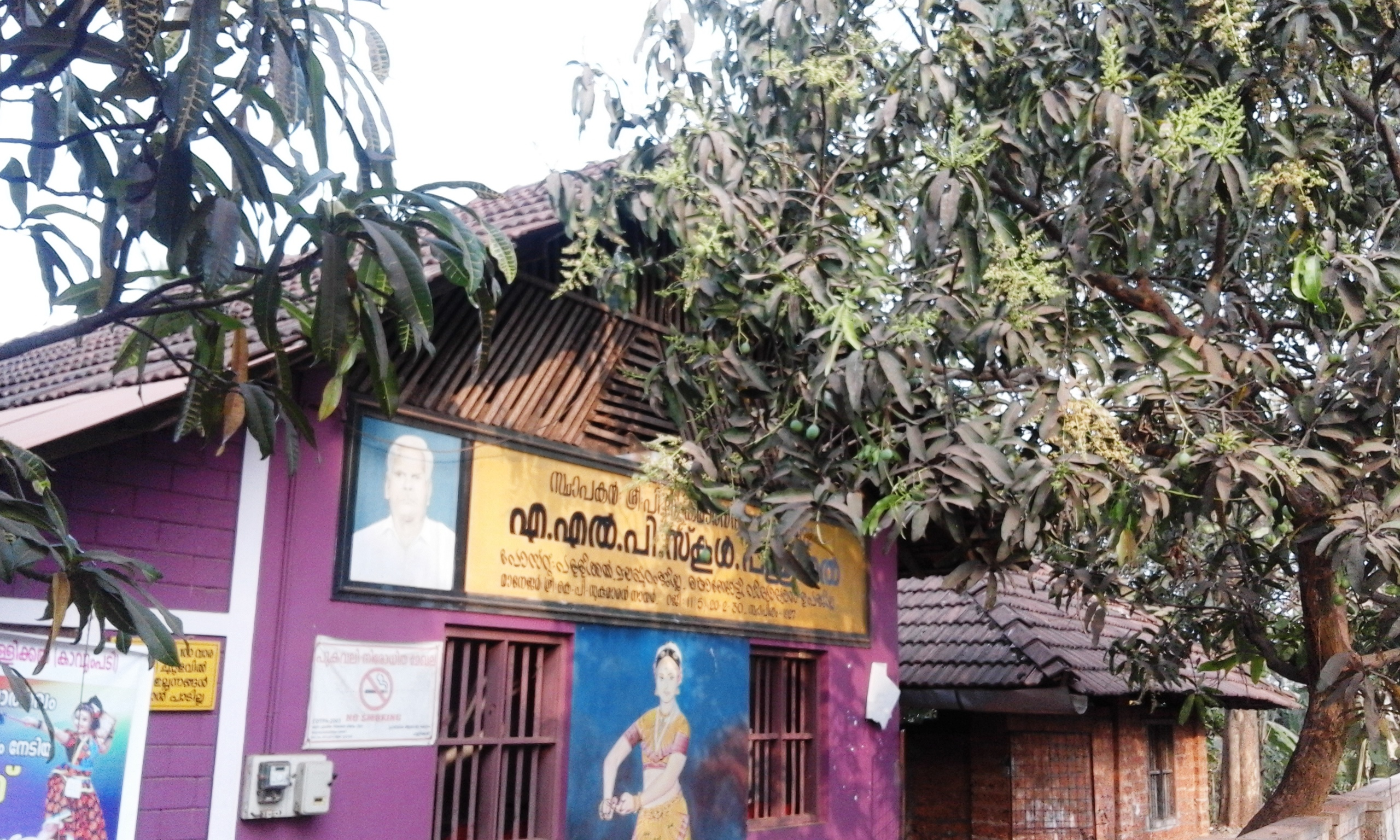
Pallikkal school
