= Karipur =

- Airport Village
- Location in Kerala, India Karipur (India)
- Coordinates: 11°8′0″N 75°57′0″E
- Country: India
- State: Kerala
- District: Malappuram

Languages
  - Official: Malayalam, English
- Time zone: UTC+5:30 (IST)
- Vehicle registration: KL-84

Karipur (also spelt Karippur) is a locality in the Kondotty taluk of the Malappuram district of Kerala, India, 25 km (16 mi) from the city of Malappuram. It is best known as the site of Calicut International Airport, mainly serving travellers of the South Malabar region. Other than that, it is a small hamlet that falls under the jurisdiction of Kondotty Municipality and Pallikkal gram panchayat. Karipur forms a portion of the Malappuram metropolitan area as of 2011 census.

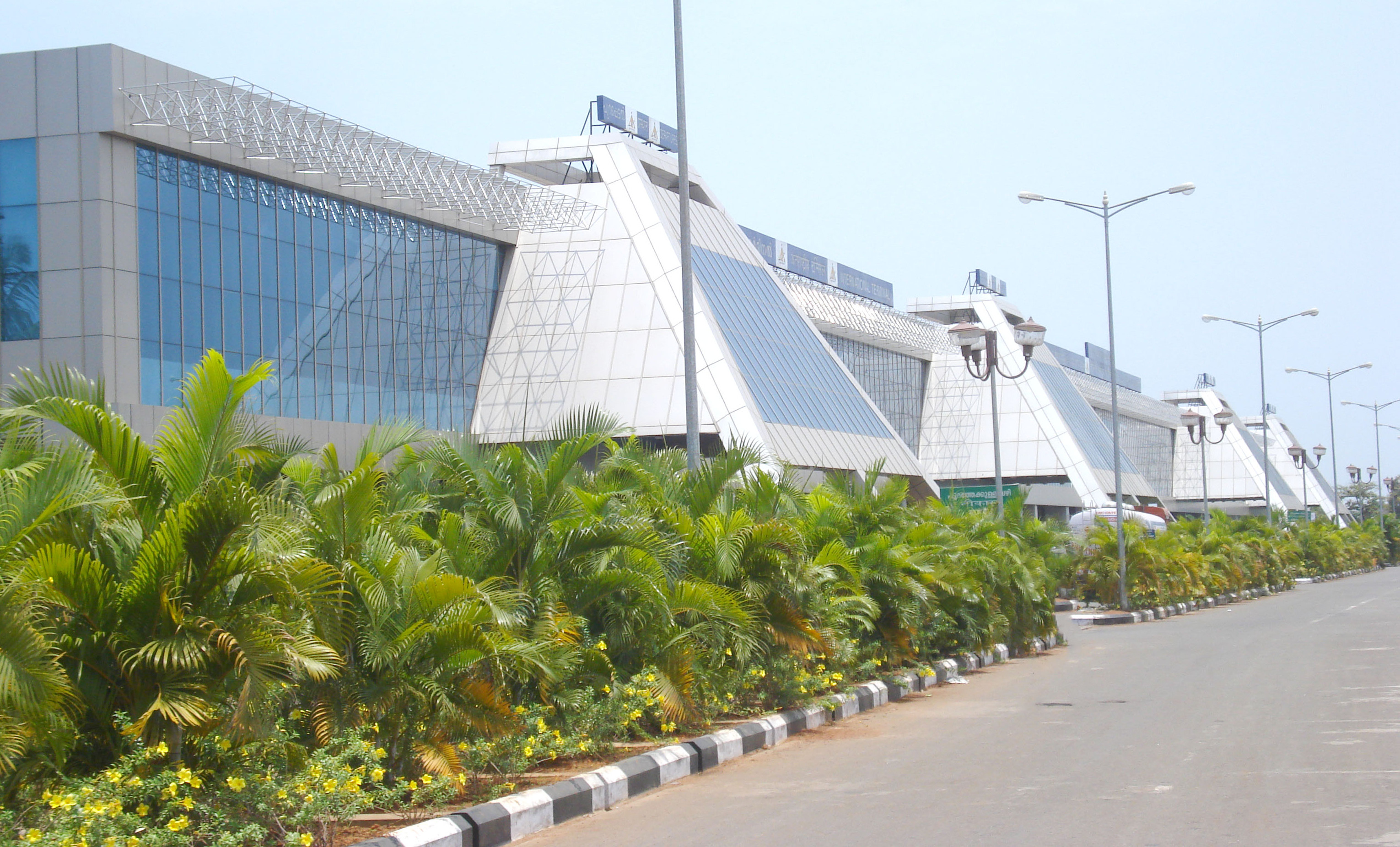
Karipur International Airport

== Schools ==
- Ideal Higher Secondary School, Dharmagiri
