= Feroke =

- Municipality
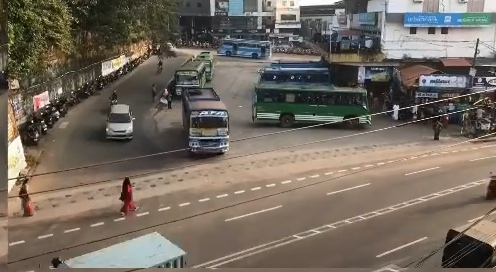
- Feroke bus stand

- Location in Kerala, India
- Coordinates: 11°11′0″N 75°51′0″E
- Country: India
- State: Kerala
- District: Kozhikode
- Taluk: Kozhikode
- Founder: Parappanad Royal family

Government
  - Type: Municipal council

Area
  - Total: 15 km^{2} (5.8 sq mi)

Population (2011)
  - Total: 54,074
  - Density: 3,600/km^{2} (9,300/sq mi)

Languages
  - Official: Malayalam, English
- Time zone: UTC+5:30 (IST)
- Postal code: 673631
- Vehicle registration: KL-85
- Lok Sabha constituency: Kozhikode
- Nearby Railway Station Nearby Airport: Feroke Railway Station Calicut International Airport

Feroke (IPA: [fɐroːkːɨ̆]) is a Municipality in Kozhikode district, Kerala, and part of the Kozhikode metropolitan area. It is 11 km from Kozhikode city and is developing as a suburb, included in the city's urban masterplan.

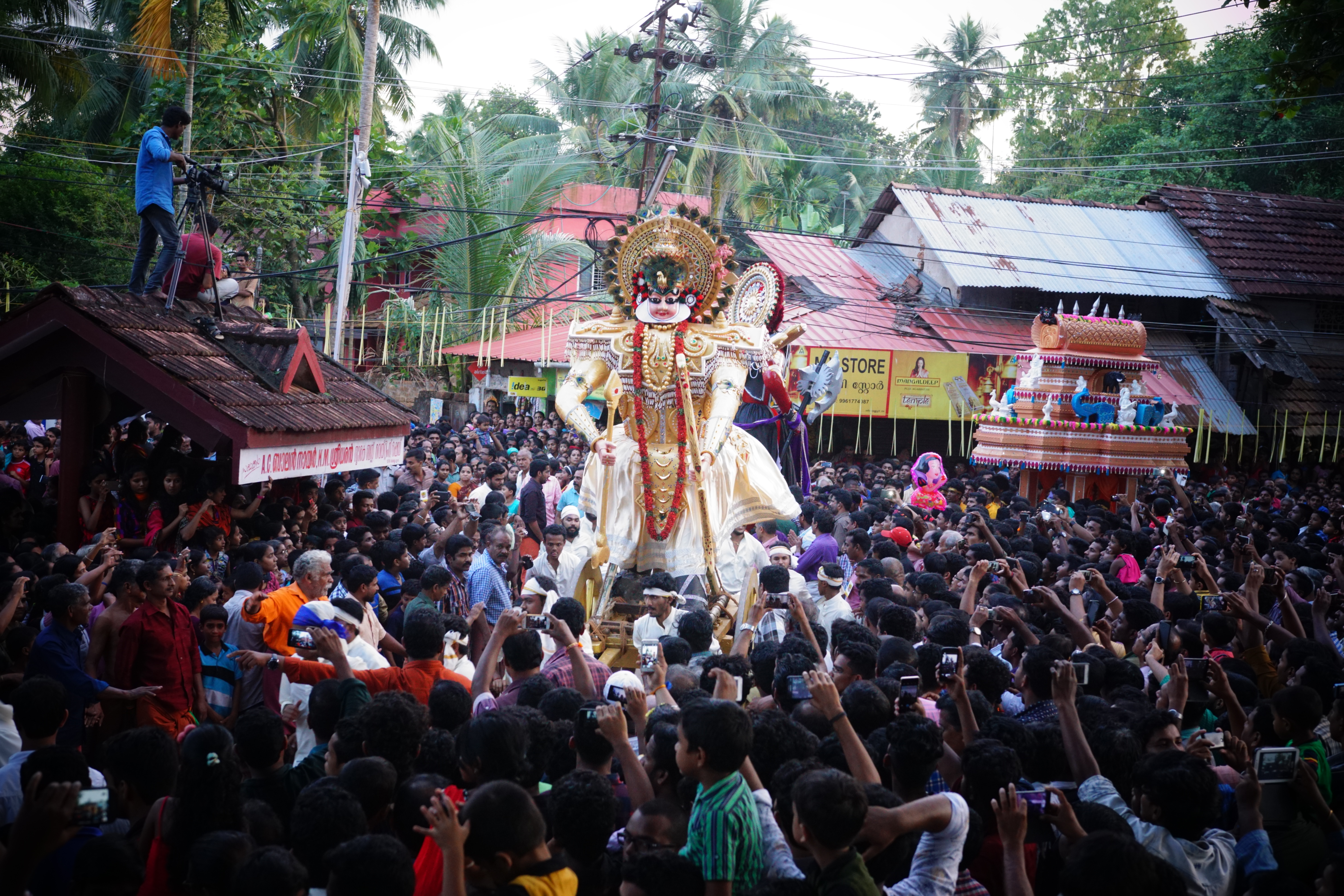
Cheruvannur Festival

== Name ==
The village was originally named Farookhabad by Tipu Sultan. Later, this was changed to Feroke by the British. Tipu Sulthan wanted to make Feroke as his capital in Malabar. The remains of a fort built by Tipu Sultan still stands in Feroke with a long tunnel to the river. Authorities are trying to preserve the fort remains as a site of historical importance. The old bridge at Feroke was built by the British in 1883.

== History ==
Feroke, on the southern bank of Chaliyar river, was adjacent to the kingdom of Parappanad during medieval period. The rulers of Parappanad were vassals to the Zamorin of Calicut. The headquarters of Parappanad Royal family was the coastal town of Parappanangadi in present-day Malappuram district. In the 15th century CE, Parappanad Swaroopam was divided into two - Northern Parappanad (Beypore Swaroopam) and Southern Parappanad (Parappur Swaroopam). Beypore, Cheruvannur, and Panniyankara, on northern bank of Chaliyar, became Northern Parappanad. Kadalundi, Vallikkunnu, and Parappanangadi, on the southern bank of Chaliyar became Southern Parappanad.

It is also known the ruler of the Kingdom of Tanur (Vettathunadu Swaroopam) had assisted the Portuguese to build a fort at the island of Chaliyam, which was a part of Southern Parappanad. It was destroyed during the Battle at Chaliyam fort occurred in 1571. Feroke became a part of the Kingdom of Mysore in the late 18th century CE. Following the Third Anglo-Mysore War and the subsequent Treaty of Seringapatam, Feroke became a part of Malabar District under British Raj. Feroke was included in Eranad Taluk in the Malappuram Revenue Division of Malabar District with its Taluk headquarters at Manjeri. Following the formation of the state of Kerala in 1956, Feroke became a part of Tirurangadi Revenue block of Tirur Taluk. On 16 June 1969, Eranad Taluk, Tirur Taluk, Tirurangadi, and Parappanangadi were transferred to the newly formed Malappuram district. However, three Revenue Villages of Tirur Taluk, namely Feroke, Ramanattukara, and Kadalundi, remained in Kozhikode district, as they were much closer to Kozhikode city centre. However Kadalundi Nagaram beach (where the Kadalundi River flows into Arabian Sea, a part of Vallikkunnu grama panchayat), Tenhipalam, the centre of University of Calicut, and Karippur, the site of Kozhikode International Airport, became parts of Malappuram.

Feroke, Ramanattukara, and Kadalundi are parts of Kozhikode taluk and Kozhikode metropolitan area.

== Demographics ==
Feroke Municipality population
Year	Pop.	±%
1961	24,124	—
1971	30,516	+26.5%
1981	37,720	+23.6%
1991	44,494	+18.0%
2001	50,277	+13.0%
2011	54,074	+7.6%
Source: Census of India

As of the 2001 India census, Feroke had a population of 29,504. Males constitute 49% of the population and females 51%. In Feroke, 13% of the population is under 6 years of age.

As of the 2011 India census, Feroke has a population of 32,122 of which 15,596 are males while 16,526 are females.

The population of children ages 0-6 is 3,979 which is 12.39% of the total population of Feroke (CT). In Feroke the female sex ratio is of 1060 against state average of 1084. Moreover, the child sex ratio in Feroke is around 969 compared to the Kerala state average of 964. The literacy rate of Feroke city is 95.99% higher than the state average of 94.00%. In Feroke, male literacy is around 97.67% while the female literacy rate is 94.42%.

== Civic Administration ==
=== Feroke Municipality Election 2020 ===
S.No.	Party name	Party symbol	Number of Councillors
01	UDF		20
02	LDF		17
03	BJP		01

== Election results ==
=== 2025 Election results ===
2025 Feroke Municipal election
- 11 December 2025

All 39 councils in the Feroke Municipality 20 seats needed for a majority
- Turnout: 77.08%
	First party	Second party	Third party
Party	CPI(M)	INC	BJP
Alliance	LDF	UDF	NDA
Last election	17	20	1
Seats won	15	23	1
Seat change	2▼	3▲	0
Popular vote	13,784	17,412	3,639
Percentage	38.39%	48.50%	10.13%
Municipal Chairman before election
NC Abdul Razak
IUML
Elected Municipal Chairman
C Chandrika
IUML

=== 2020 Election results ===
2020 Feroke Municipal election
- 8 December 2020

All 38 councils in the Feroke Municipality 20 seats needed for a majority
- Turnout: 79.81%
	First party	Second party	Third party
Party	CPI(M)	INC	BJP
Alliance	LDF	UDF	NDA
Last election	18	17	1
Seats won	17	20	1
Seat change	1▼	3▲	0
Popular vote	14,820	14,921	4,273
Percentage	42.57%	42.86%	12.27%
Municipal Chairman before election
K Kamarulaila
CPI(M)
Elected Municipal Chairman
NC Abdul Razak
IUML

== Industry ==
Feroke is the cradle of the tile industry in Kerala. The rapid rivers from the Western Ghats after passing through forests carry the clay which is the raw-material for tiles, pottery and ceramic wares. There are more than a dozen tile factories in Feroke. Common Wealth Tile factory is the most famous active tile factory in Feroke. Feroke is also well known for its wood and timber industries.

Cheruvannur and Feroke are predominant industrial areas of Kozhikode. A number of tile factories, match factories, timber industries, automobile dealerships, footwear industries, and steel factories are located in Feroke, providing employment to thousands of workers.

== Farook College ==
Farook College is the biggest educational organization of Feroke area. The college was started in 1948 and enjoys autonomous status from 2015. It is the largest residential post-graduate institution affiliated with the University of Calicut. The college is located on a hillock originally called 'Irumooli Paramba' 5 km from Feroke Railway Station and 16 km from the city of Calicut and at a distance of 16 km from the Calicut Airport. The entire campus comprising the college, its hostels, the staff quarters and its sister concerns covers an area of 70 acres. The entire village is popularly called 'Farook College' and has a post office called Farook College.

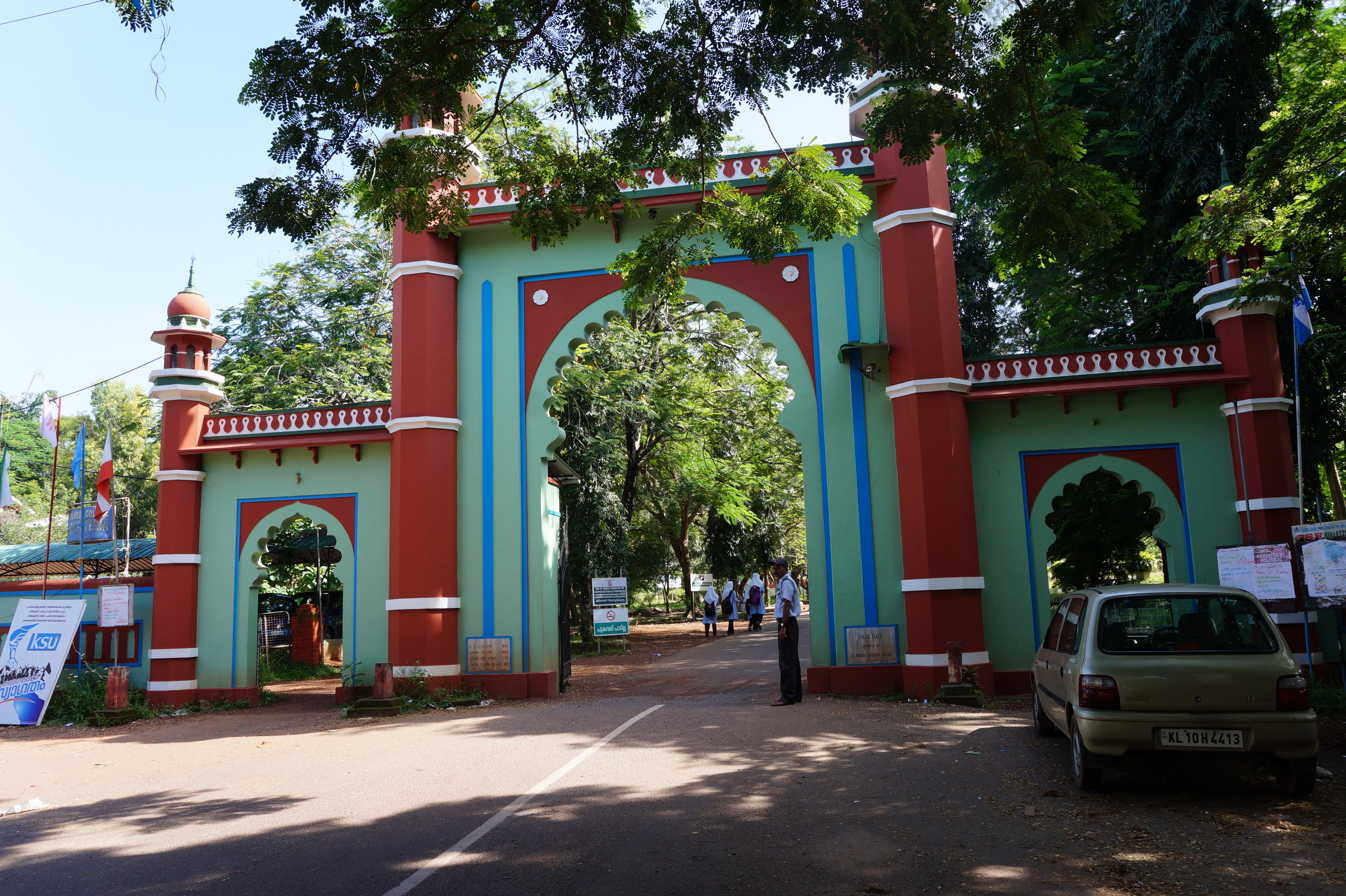
Rajah Gate of Farook College

== Hospitals ==
- Koyas Hospital
- Employees' State Insurance Hospital, Feroke
- Red Crescent Hospital, Chungam.
- Shifa hospital, kallampara
- Govt. Taluk Hospital, Chanda Feroke

== Education ==
=== Irshadiya College (3 km) ===
Irshadiya College is an educational institution located in Paruthippara road. It has a historic experience of nearly four decades in the educational purview of Feroke. Its main peculiarly is that it offers courses in both arts and Islamic studies. Hundreds of students are studying from in and outside of Kerala.

=== RCCM College (1 km) ===
RCCM College is an exclusive educational institution for commerce students located in Cheruvannur.

== Karuvanthuruthy ==
Karuvanthuruthy is a fishing village near Feroke. It is surrounded on sides with water giving the name 'thiruth' to it. The village is located on the western side of Feroke railway station. The underbridge from Feroke town goes to Karuvanthuruthy town and the Karuvanthuruthy bridge connects the town to Chaliyam beach and seawalk.

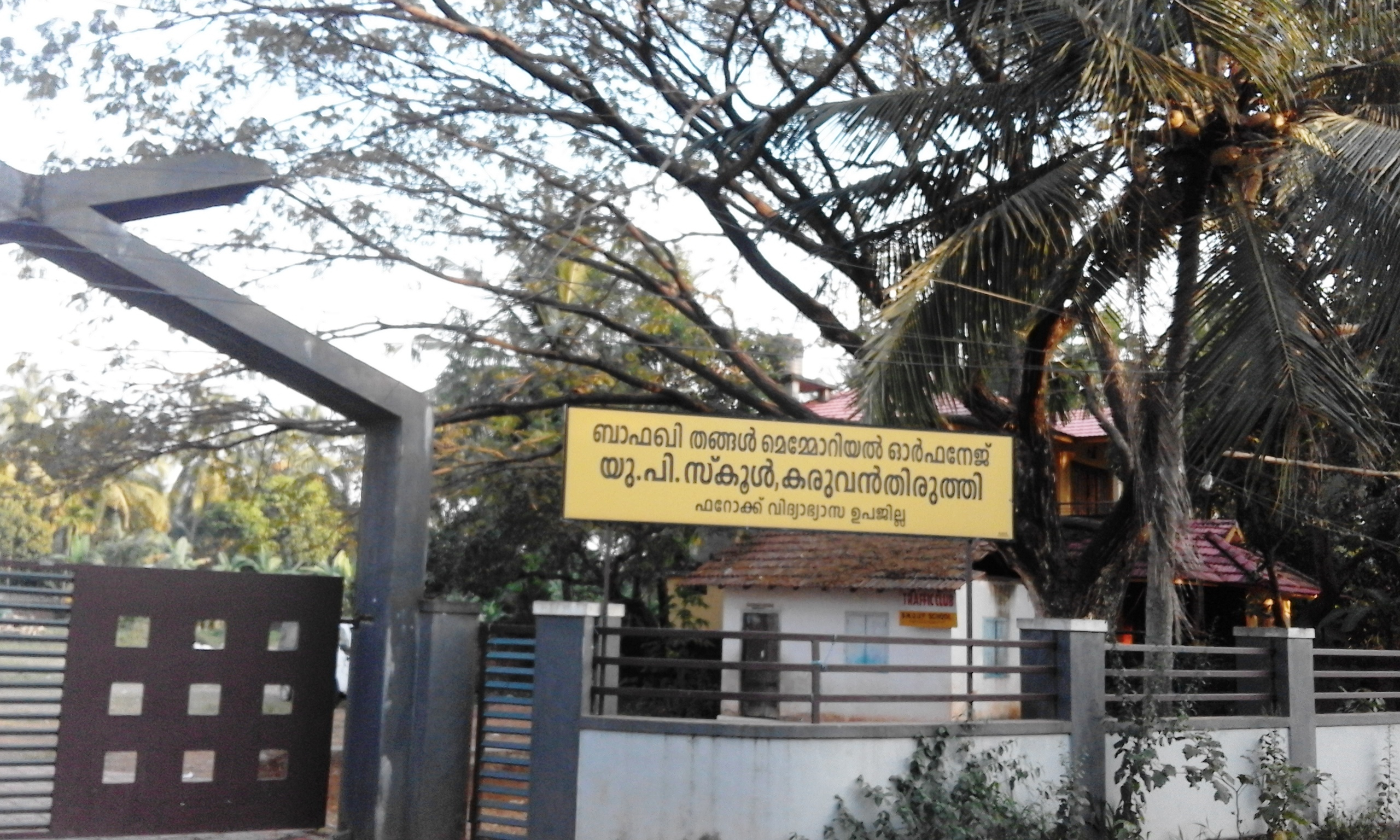
Bafaki School

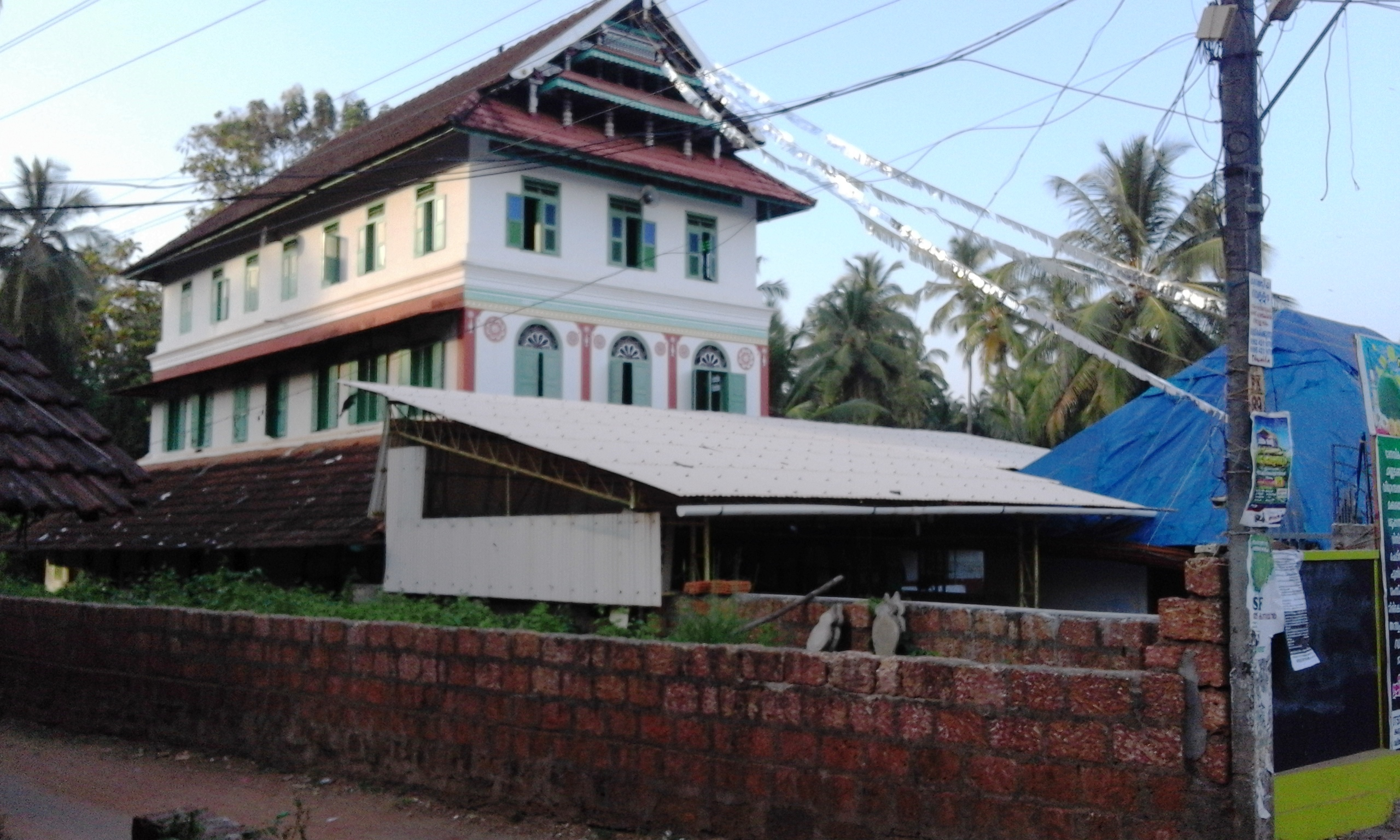
Kadavath Masjidh

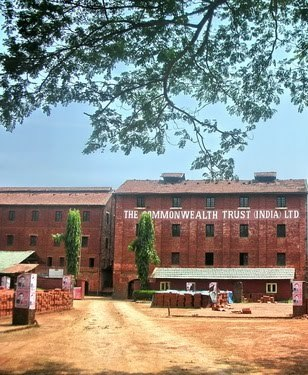
Commonwealth factory

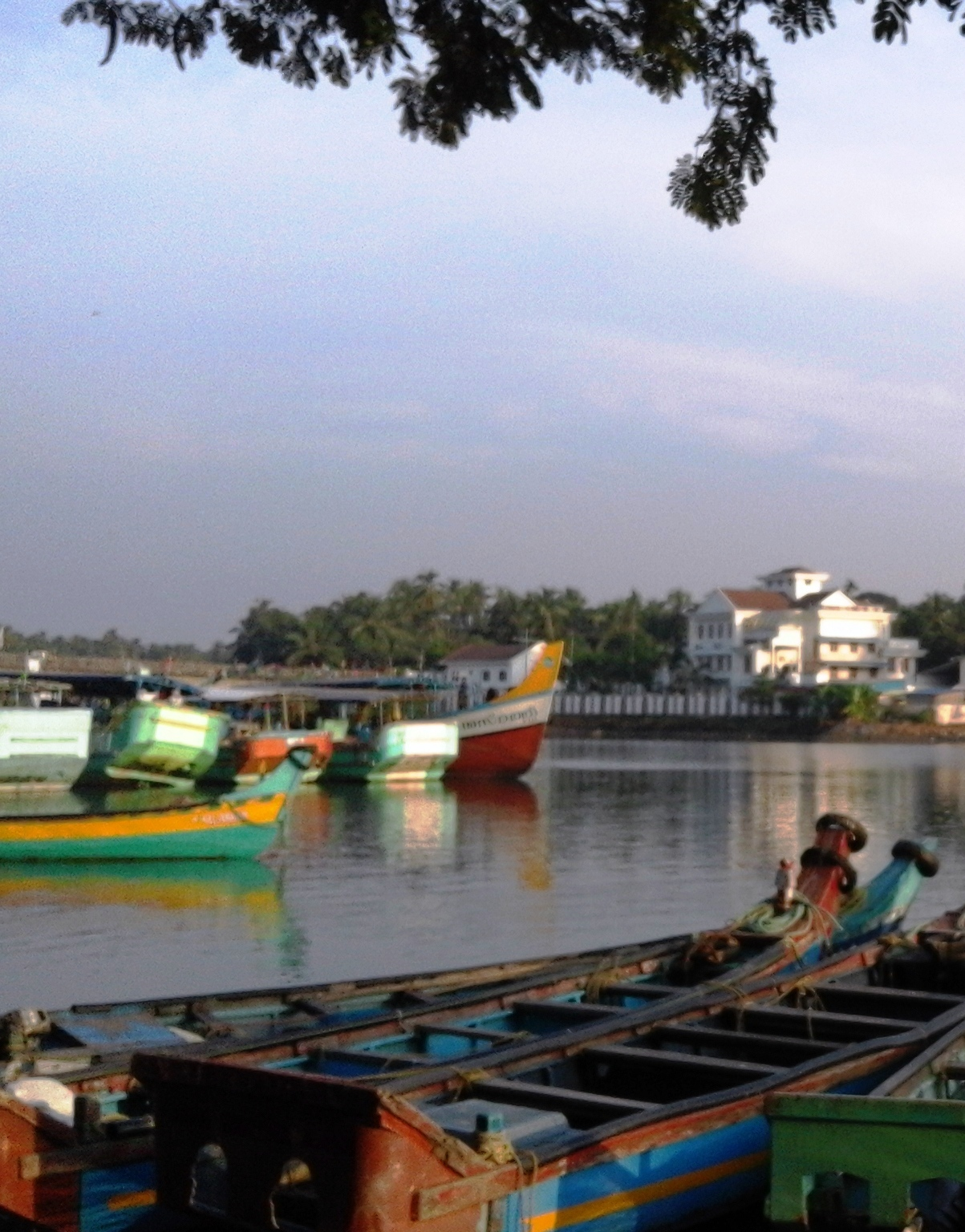
Karuvanthuruthy Kadavu

=== Kadalundi (6 km) ===
Kadalundi is one of the oldest towns in Kerala and is an example of the old ports called "thundies". The tidal/mangrove forest on the banks of the Kadalundi river make it a picturesque area. The deltas formed by the Kadalundi river add to the beauty of the place. The town is divided into two by the river— Kadalundi in the Kozhikode district and Kadalundi Nagaram in Malappuram district. Thousands of migratory birds from all over the world gather here starting in November.

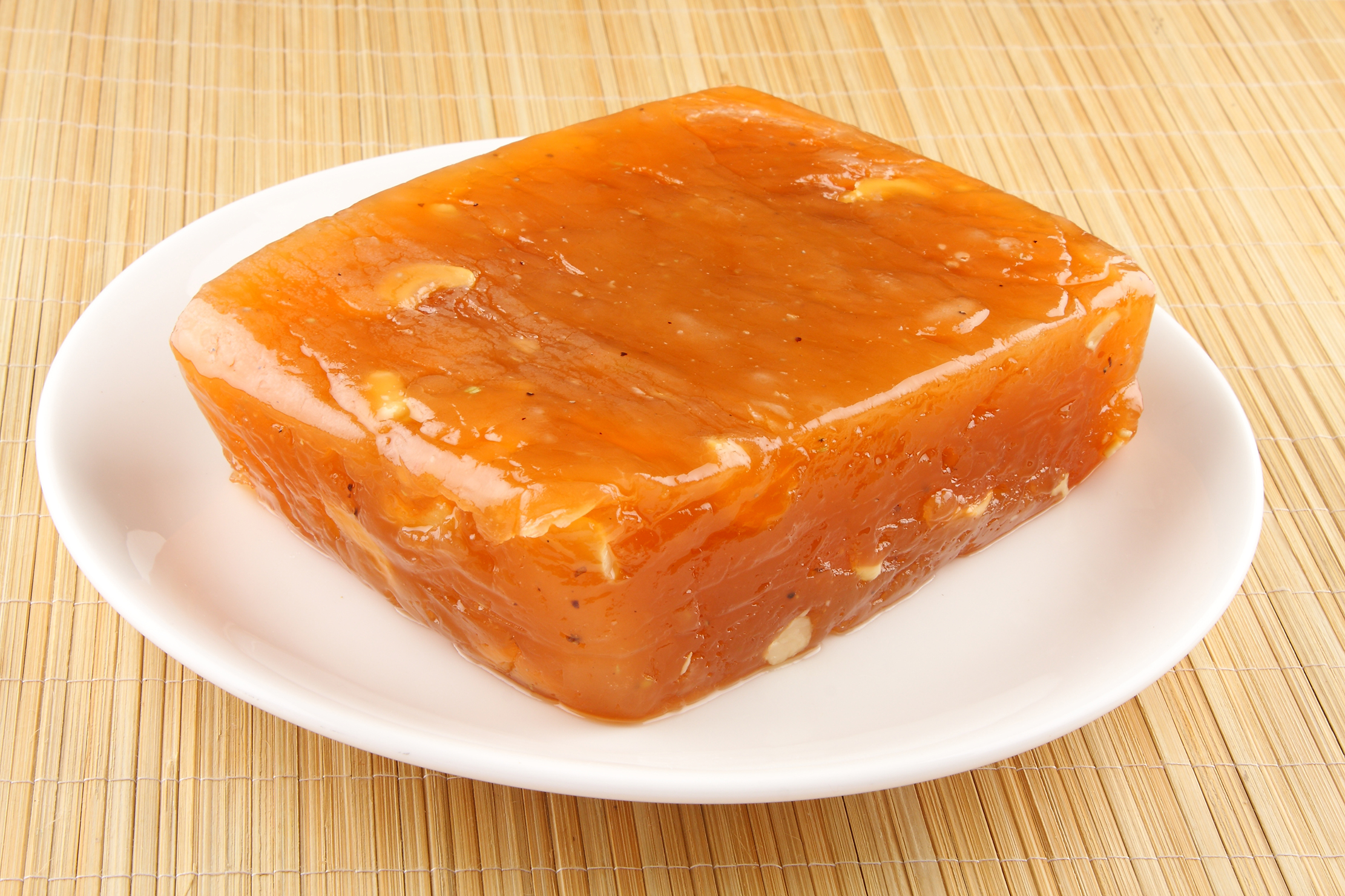
Halwas are popular in Feroke

== Major Landmarks ==
- Mananchira, 11 km
- University of Calicut, 9 km
- Farook College, 3 km
- Al-farook College, 3 km
- Medical college Kozhikode, 17 km
- Calicut Airport, 17 km
- Kadalundi Bird Sanctuary 7.4 km
- Beypore Beach, 6 km

== Villages and Suburbs ==
- Chandakkadavu, Pettah and Chungam
- Karuvanthuruthi, Thirichilangadi and Kokkivalavu
- Adivaram, Melevaram and Irumoolipparamba
- Perumugham and Pullikkadavu.
- Kallampara
- Nallur
- Puttekadu
- Chenaparamba
- Karad
- Feroke Railway Station

== Image gallery ==
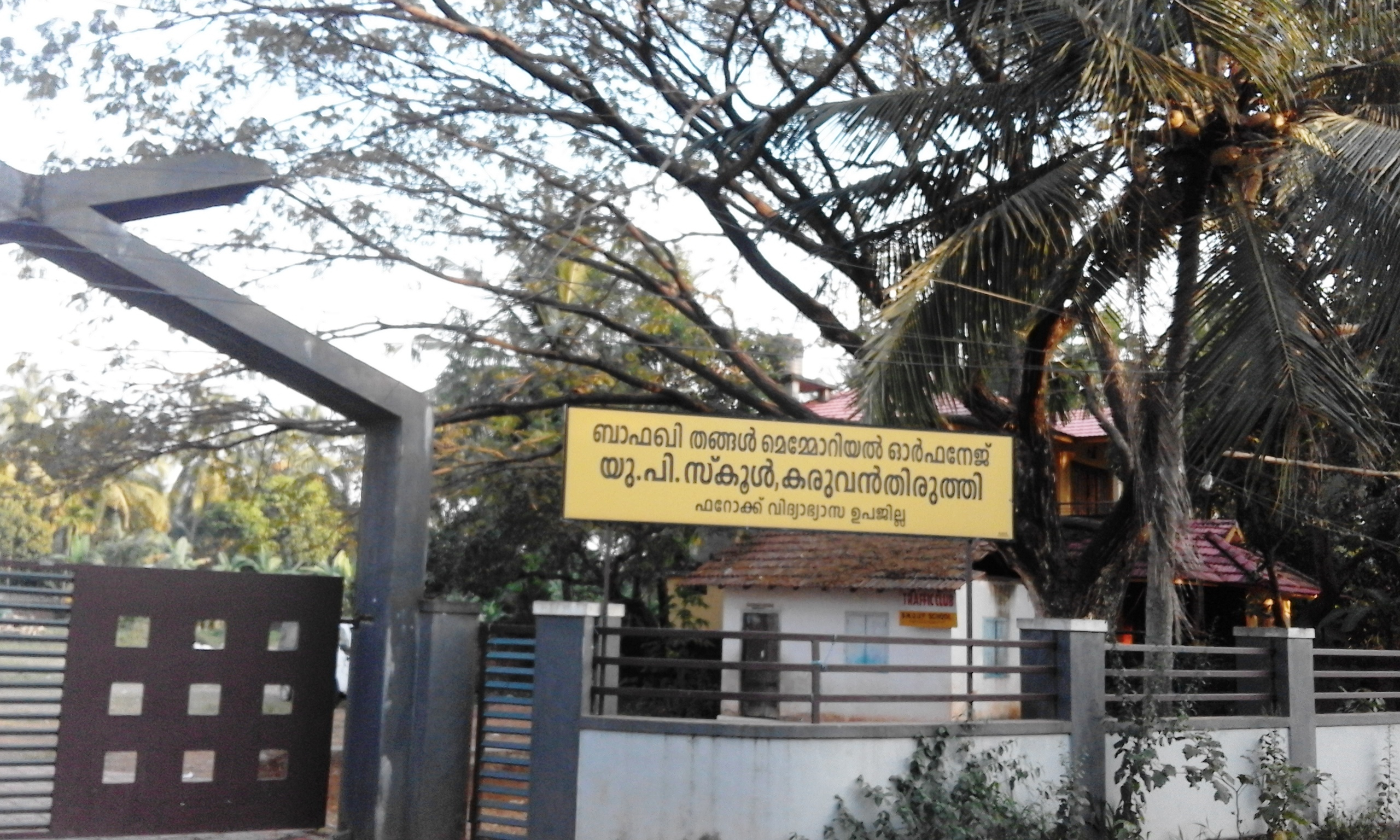
Orphanage School

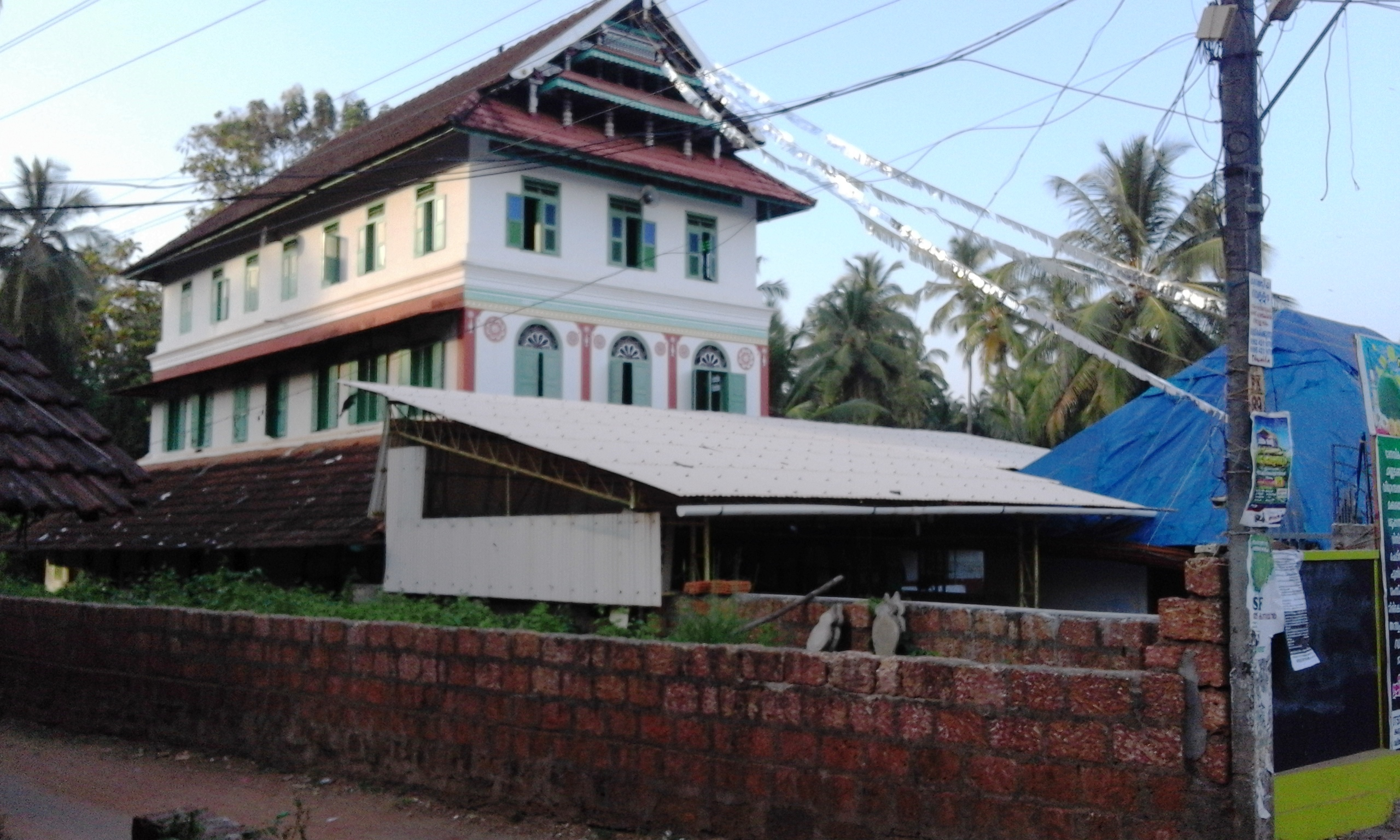
Kadavath Masjidh

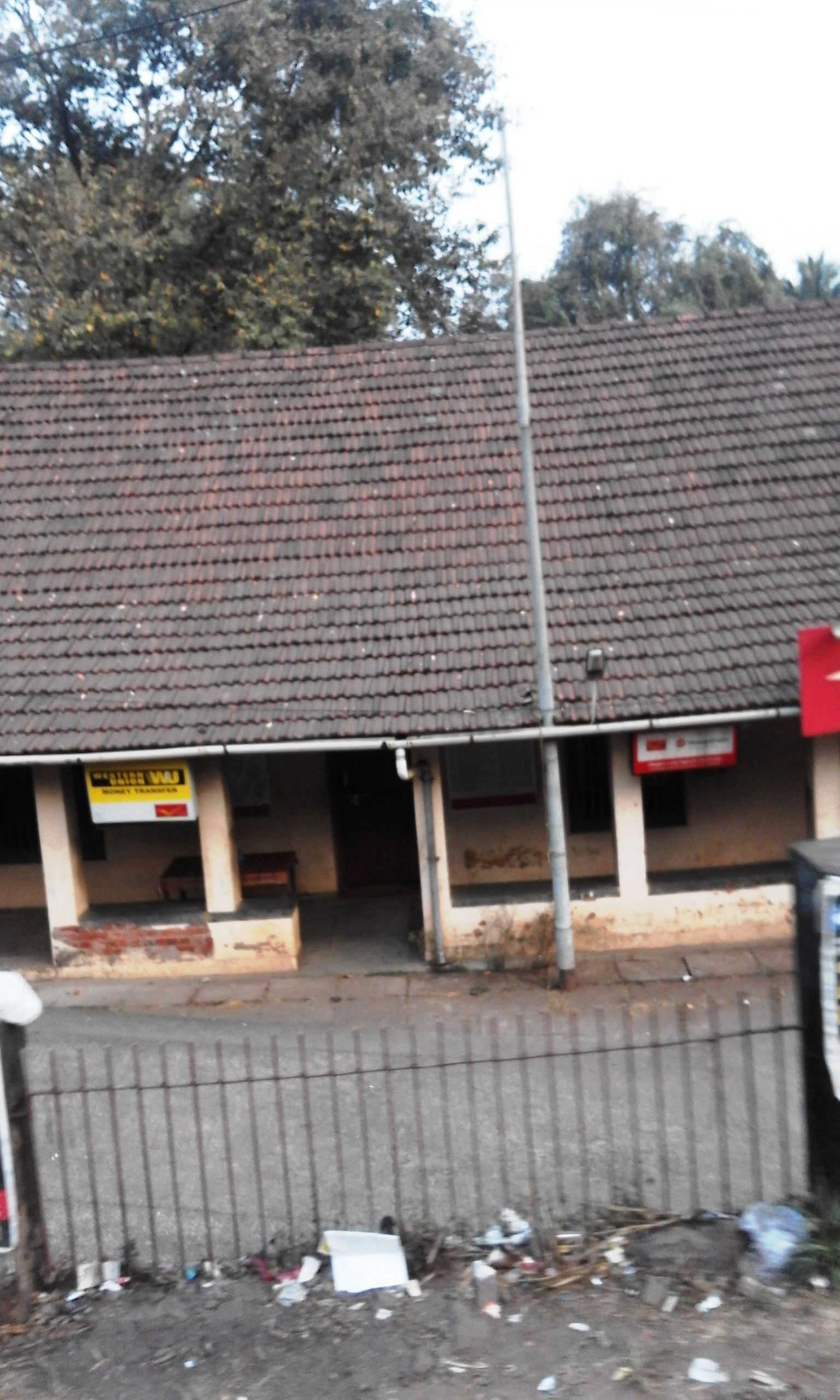
Feroke Post Office

== See also ==
- Kadalundi Bird Sanctuary
- Paruthippara
- Farook College
- Ramanattukara
- Cheruvannur
- Karuvanthiruthy
- Kadalundi
- Chelembra
- Cherukavu
