= Mamburam, Malappuram =

Mampuram
- Pilgrim Village
- Interactive map of Mampuram
- Coordinates: 11.05595°N 75.92231°E
- Country: India
- State: Kerala
- District: Malappuram

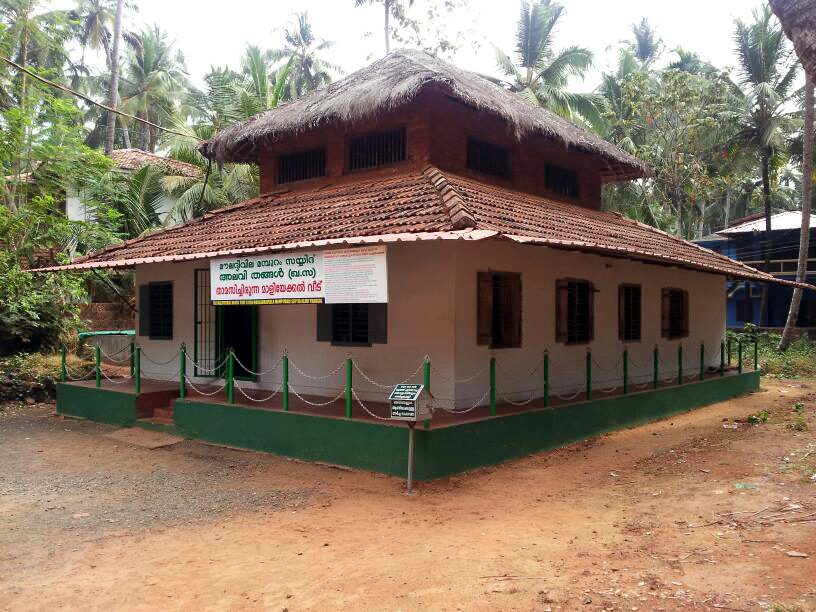
Mampuram Thangal's Antique House

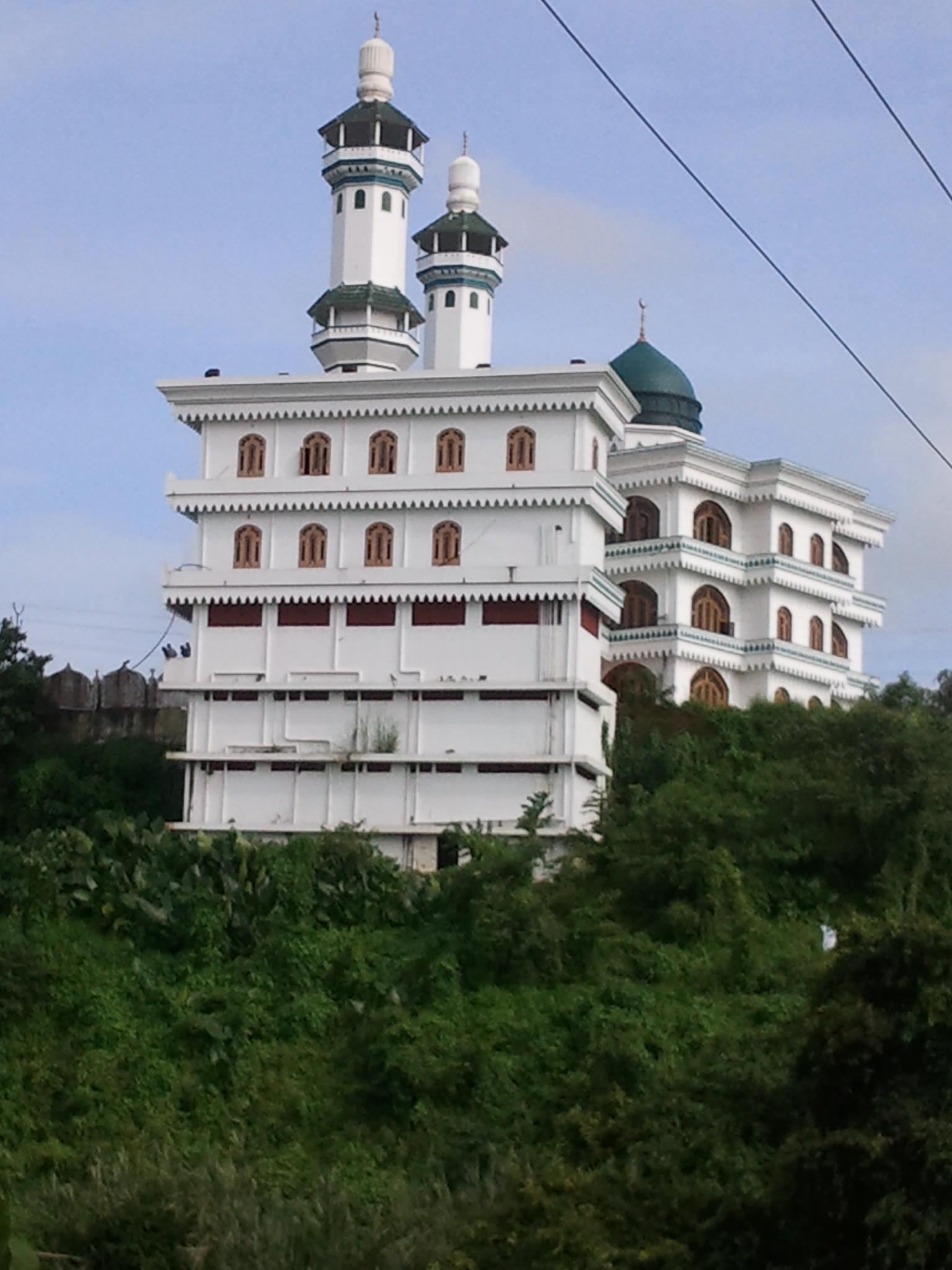
Valiya Jumaeth Palli

Mampuram is a Muslim pilgrimage centre located 26 km east of Tirur, Malappuram district, Kerala, South India on the Malabar Coast. Malappuram is on the banks of the river Kadalundipuzha. The Mamburam Makham, which is the shrine intended and used primarily as a receptacle for the dead bodies of the principle Thangals is located there. The Malappuram Nercha, is held every year in the month of Muharram near the tomb of Sayyid Alavi Thangal.

== History ==
Mampuram was an active center of the Khilafath movement as well as the national movement. The Thirurangadi Juma Masjid, from where the local khilafath leader Ali Musliyar operated, is situated in Mampuram.

== Image gallery ==
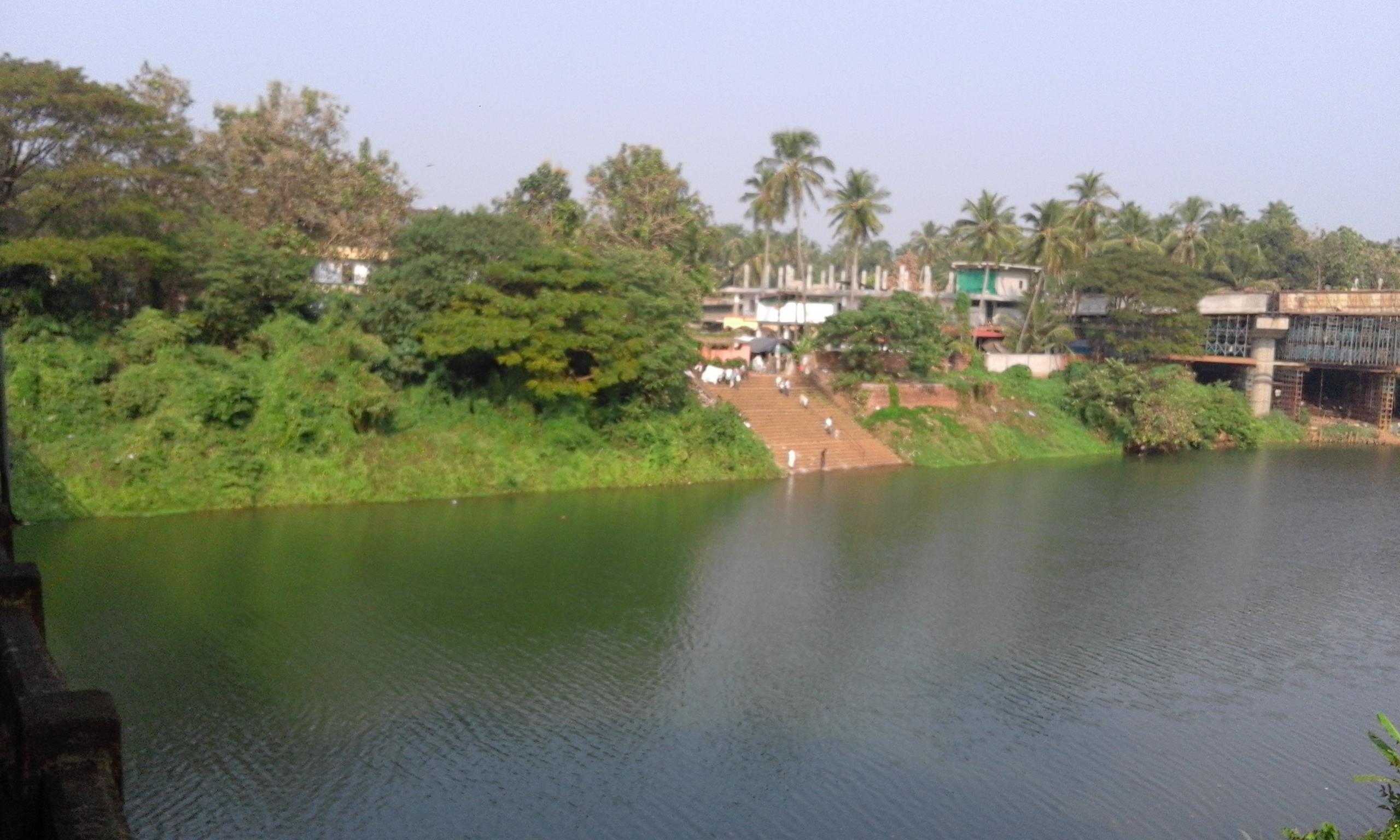
View from the bridge

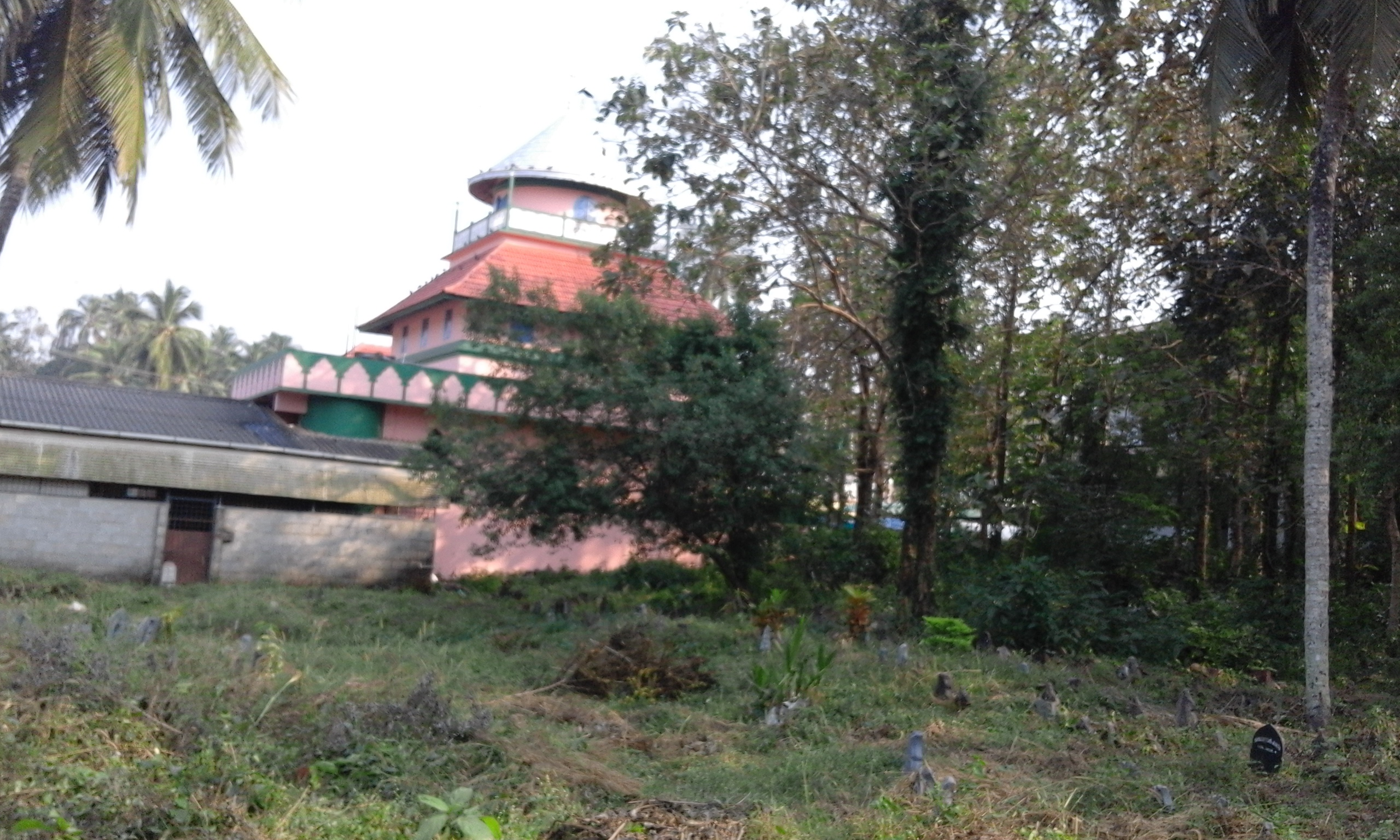
Mamburam Dargah

== See also ==
- Mappila
- Thangal
- Sayid Fasal Pookoya Thangal
- Kondotty
- Murder of Collector Connolly
