= Mambaram =

Mambaram may refer to:

- Mambaram, Malappuram, India
- Mambaram, Kannur, India
