= Tirurangadi =

- Municipality
- Tirurangadi Orphanage
- Interactive map of Tirurangadi
- Coordinates: 11.05°N 75.93°E
- Country: India
- State: Kerala
- District: Malappuram

Government
  - Type: Municipality
  - Body: Tirurangadi Municipality
  - Municipal Chairperson: Habeeba Basheer (IUML)
  - Vice Chairperson: M. Abdurahman Kutty (IUML)

Area
  - Total: 17.73 km^{2} (6.85 sq mi)
- Elevation: 10 m (33 ft)

Population (2011)
  - Total: 56,632
  - Density: 3,194/km^{2} (8,273/sq mi)

Languages
  - Official: Malayalam, English
- Time zone: UTC+5:30 (IST)
- Postal code: 676306
- Vehicle registration: KL-65
- Website: tirurangadimunicipality.lsgkerala.gov.in/en/

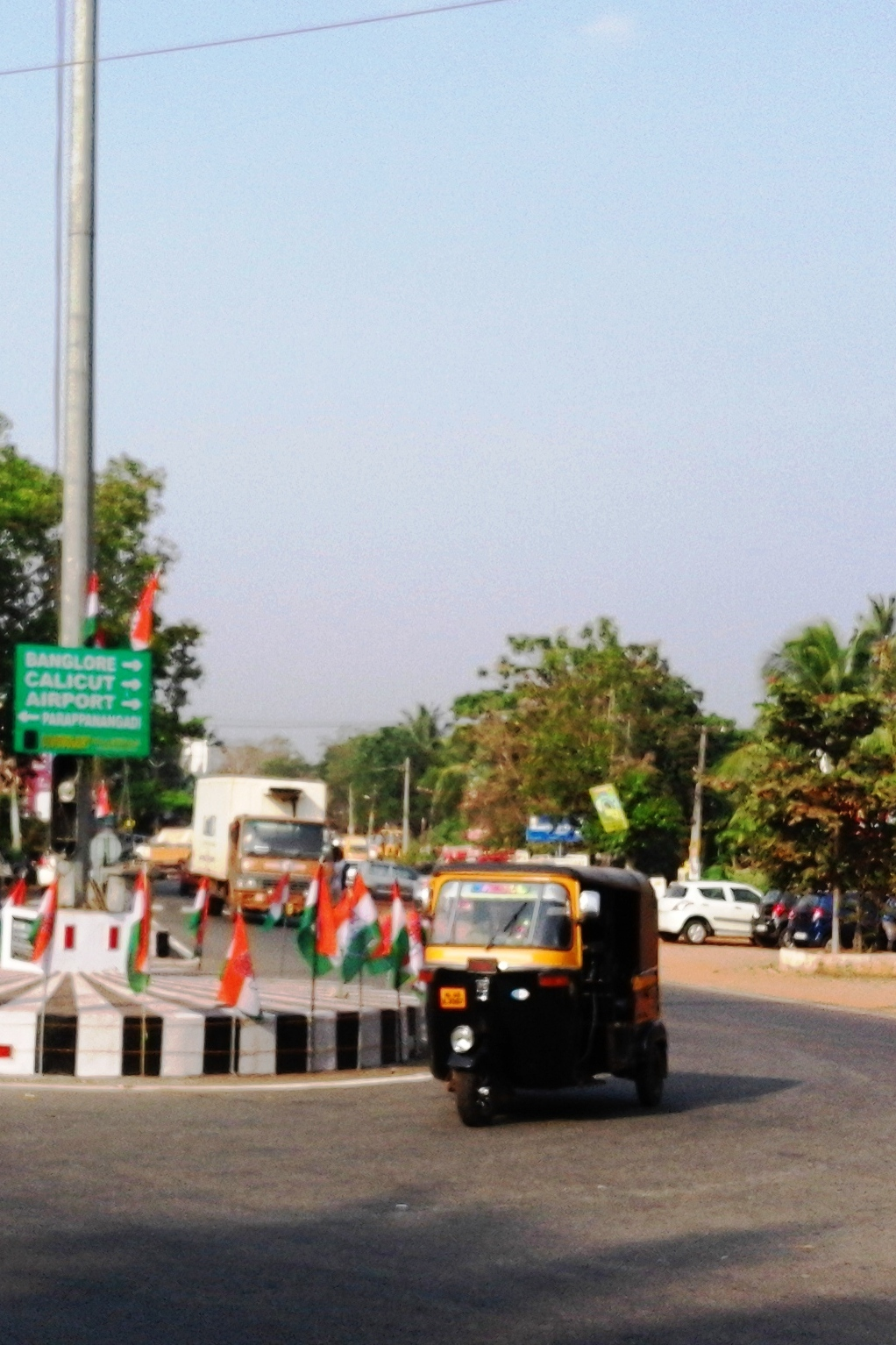
Kakkad Junction, Tirurangadi

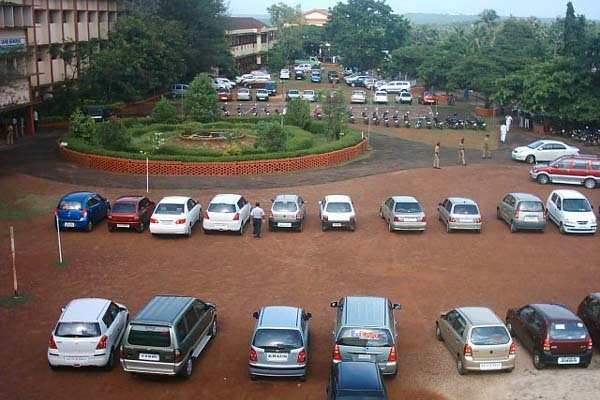
PSMO College

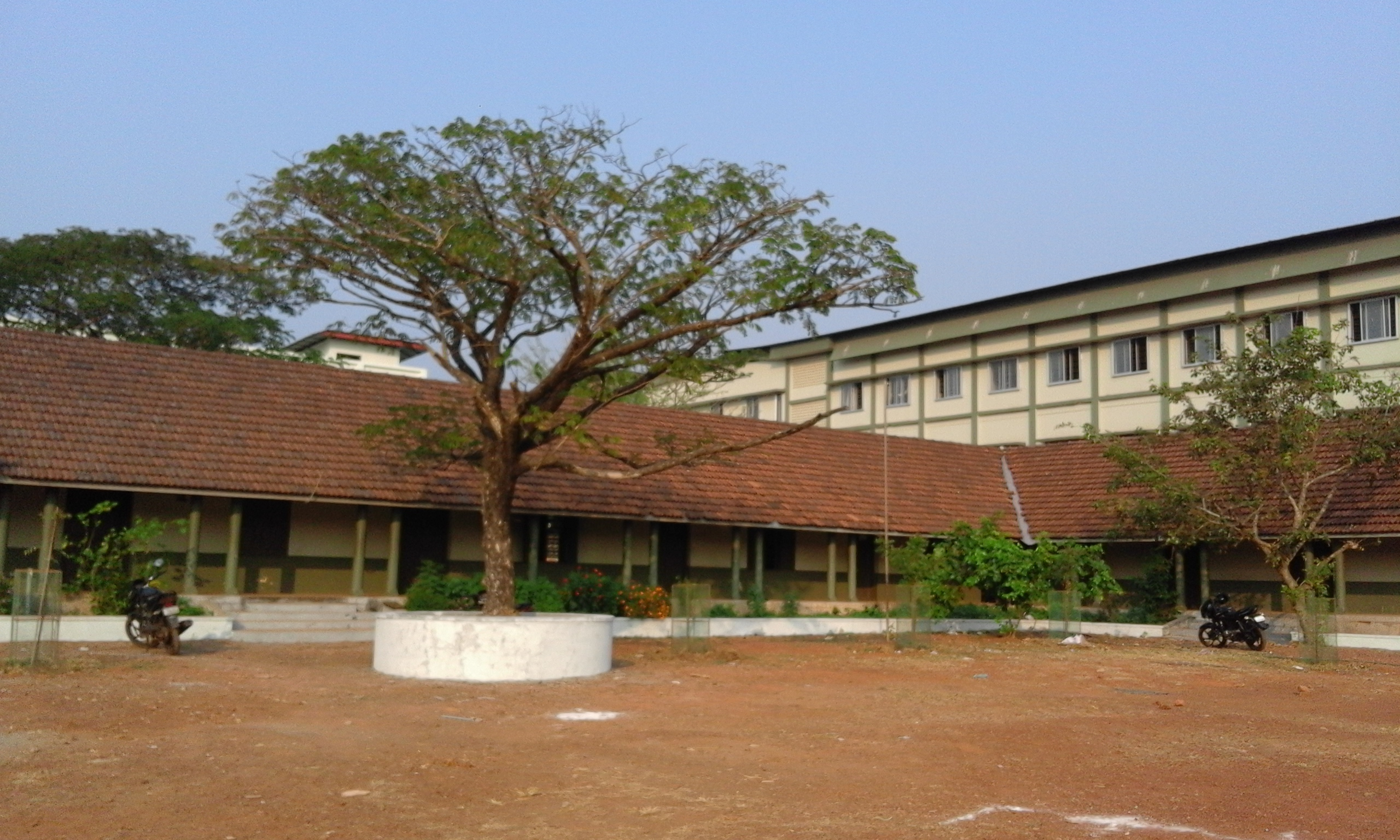
Tirurangadi Yatheem Khana

Tirurangadi is a municipal town in Malappuram district of the Indian state Kerala. It is a historic town famed for its active participation in the freedom struggle, especially those dating back to the 1920s. It serves as a local taluk and is located, 30 km south of Calicut and 140 km north of Ernakulam.

It is located 9 km east of the coastal town of Parappanangadi, 10 km northwest of Kottakkal, 11 km northeast of Tanur town, 16 km southwest of Kondotty town, 17 km north of Tirur, and 18 km west of Malappuram.

== History ==
Tirurangadi, which was then an important centre of trade, was known by the name Tiruwarankad to the Arabs, during the middle ages. It was ruled by the Misba Arien during the Middle ages. Later in 18th century, the region came under the Kingdom of Mysore. The Battle of Tirurangadi was a series of engagements that took place between the British army and Tipu Sultan, the ruler of the Kingdom of Mysore, between 7 and 12 December 1790 at Tirurangadi, during the Third Anglo-Mysore War.

Mysore rule was followed by British Raj at the end of 18th century CE. Cheranad was a name of an erstwhile province in the kingdom of Zamorin of Calicut, which had included parts of present-day Tirurangadi and Tirur Taluks of Malappuram district in it. Later it became a Taluk of Malabar District, when Malabar came under the British Raj. The headquarters of Cheranad Taluk was the town of Tirurangadi. Later the Taluk was merged with Eranad Taluk.

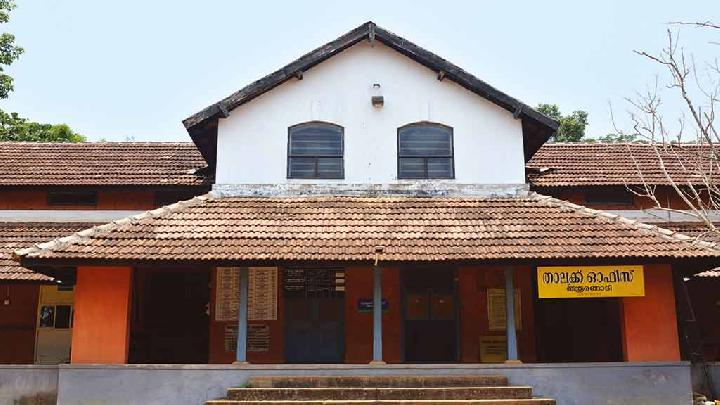
Tirurangadi Taluk Office

Tirurangadi was one of the main centres of Malabar Rebellion of 1921. The Tirurangadi Taluk Office, which was an important administrative centre during British Raj, is also a monument of the rebellion.

When Tirur Taluk was formed in 1957, Tirurangadi block became a part of it. Later in the 1990s, Vengara and Tirurangadi Revenue blocks were separated to form the modern Tirurangadi Taluk.

== Geography ==
Tirurangadi is located at 11.05°N 75.93°E. It has an average elevation of 10 m (33 ft).

== Civic administration ==
=== 2020 municipal election ===
S.No.	Party name	Party symbol	Number of Councillors
01	UDF		33
02	LDF		04
02	Independents =		04

Municipal Chairman :

Janab K.P.Mohammed Kutty [Indian Union Muslim league. ] Vice Chair Person. C.P. Suharabi [ Indian National Congress ]

== Religion ==
Total population: 56,700 Hindu: 14.39% Muslim: 85.24% Christian: 0.23% Sikh: 0.00% Buddhist: 0.00% Jain: 0.00% Others: 0.00% Not Stated: 0.14%

== Transport ==
This town is well connected with all parts of Kerala and National Highway 66 (India) (Old number NH17) passes through this town. There are two main bus stations situated in the town, one in Chemmad, and another one in Kakkad. The former is for buses plying the nearby areas while the latter is used for long distance buses only.

The nearest railway station is at Parappanangadi, 7 km away from the town and Calicut International Airport is just 21 km away.

The famous house of Ayurveda Kottakkal Aryavaidyasala is just 10 km away from Tirurangadi.

== Education ==
Tirurangadi, a well-versed place in the history of Freedom Fight is now known as a small educational hub in Malappuram district. The PSMO College is in the centre of the town surrounded by several other institutions. Headquarters of University of Calicut is just 13 km away.

=== Colleges and schools ===
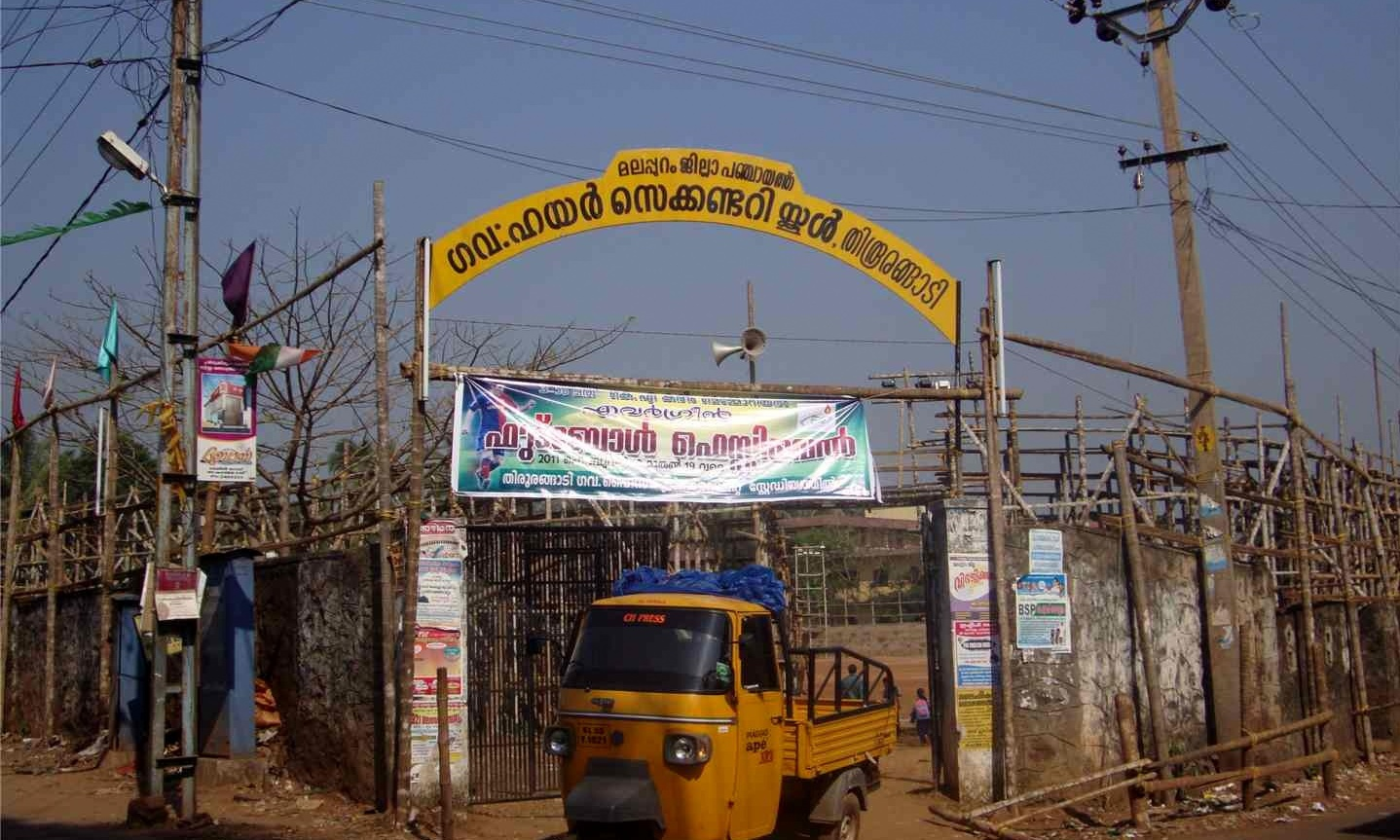
GHSS Tirurangadi

- Tirurangadi Government Higher Secondary School and Oriental Higher Secondary School are the two important schools serving the primary educational needs of the area and nearby areas.
- "Thirurangadi yatheem khana" is a well noted institution among its kind having numerous institutions under its hood, including PSMO College, KMMMO Arabic College, SSMO Teachers Training Institute, Oriental Higher Secondary School, MKH Memorial Hospital, MKH Nursing College.
1. Pocker Sahib Memorial Orphanage College (PSMO College), Tirurangadi
2. KMMO Arabic College, Tirurangadi
3. Govt. Poly Technic, Chelari, Tirurangadi
4. SSMO Teachers Training Institute, Tirurangadi
5. Govt. Higher Secondary School, Tirurangadi
6. Oriental Higher Secondary School, Tirurangadi
7. Govt. High School, Trikkulam, Tirurangadi
8. Khuthubuzzaman English Medium Higher Secondary School, Chemmad, Tirurangadi
9. MKH School of Nursing, Tirurangadi
10. Gems Public School (affiliated with CBSE, Delhi), Kooriyad, PO Tirurangadi
11. Kerala Residential Higher Secondary School, Karumbil, Tirurangadi
12. National English Medium Higher Secondary School, Chemmad, Tirurangadi
13. Malabar Central School, Valiya Paramabu, Tirurangadi
14. Noorul Huda English School, Rasheed Nagar, Tirurangadi
15. Darul Huda Islamic University,Chemmad, Tirurangadi

== Healthcare ==
1. Govt.Taluk Headquarters Hospital Thirurangadi
2. MK Haji Orphanage Hospital
3. Chemmad Nursing Home
4. Pathoor Nursing Home
5. Karuna Cancer Hospital and Research Center
6. Government Veterinary Dispensary Tirurangadi

== Places of interest ==
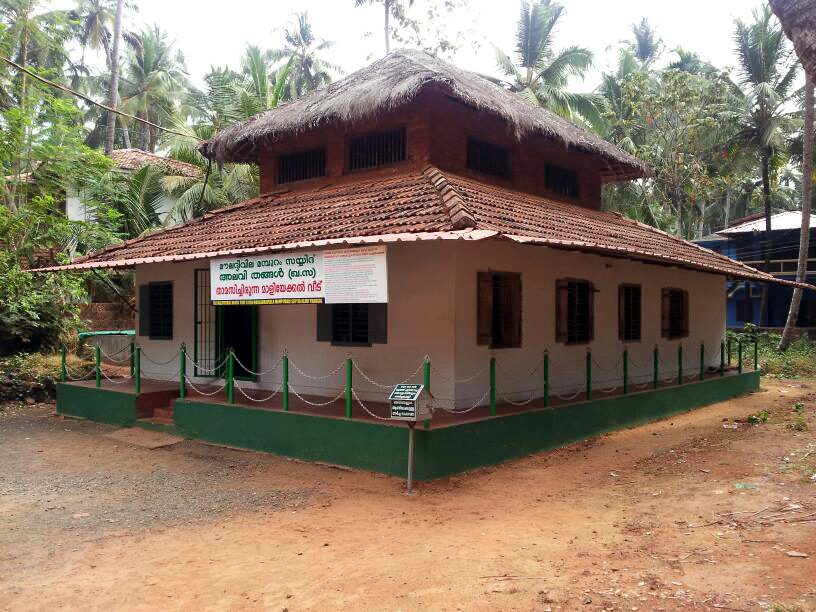
The old house of Mambaram Thangal

- Mampuram Mosque: Mamburam Mosque houses the tomb of Sayyid Alavi Mouladaveel Sayyid Alavi Thangal, a Hadrami Islamic scholar and independence activist.

== See also ==
- Tirurangadi (State Assembly constituency)
- Tirurangadi Muslim Orphanage
