= Cheruseethi Thangal =

Sufi leader

Sayyid Zain Hamid Cheruseethi Thangal
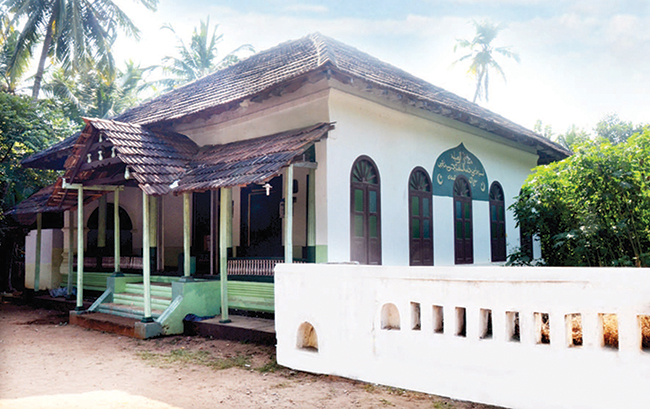
- Thazhengadi Makham

Personal life
- Born: Sayyid Zain Hamid Bin Abul Khair Abdullah Ba’ Alavi Cheruseethi Thangal (1669 C.E), (A.H. 1080) Tarim, Hadhramaut, Yemen
- Died: 1771 August 29 (C.E), 1185 Jamad-ul-Awwal 17 (A.H) Vadakara, Kerala, India
- Resting place: Thazhengadi Makham, Vadakara, Kerala, India
- Home town: Hadhramaut
- Spouse: Sayyida Khadija Beevi (Yemen)
- Children: Sayyida Aysha Beevi (daughter)
- Parent: Sayyid Abdullah Ba'Alavi (father)
- Known for: spiritual Master
- Other name: Muhammed Bin Hamid

Religious life
- Religion: Islam
- Denomination: specifically the Qadiriya order of Sufism
- Order: Qadiriya Tariqa
- Lineage: Ba' Alavi

Muslim leader
- Based in: Vadakara
- Period in office: 1701 - 1771 (C.E), 1113 - 1185 (A.H)
- Successor: Sayyid Abdurahman Mashhoor, Mamburam Thangal

Sayyid Zain Hamid Cheruseethi Thangal (Arabic : سيّد زين حامد بن اب الخير عبد الله, Malayalam: സയ്യിദ് സൈൻ ഹാമിദ് ചെറുസീതി തങ്ങൾ) was a Sufi leader born in the city of Tarim of Hadhramaut which was a part of Yemen in the year 1669 (C.E) (A.H. 1080).

== Family and early life ==
Cherussethi Thangal learned Quran and Tajwid in his hometown, then he gained further religious knowledge from scholars including Abdullah ibn Alawi al-Haddad [1634 - 1720]. He went to study in Mecca for a short time, before travelling to India.

== In Malabar ==
Cheruseethi Thangal alighted at Kerala with his brother Sheikh Sayyid Jamaludeen Muhammudul Wahthi in Hijri year 1113 (1701 C.E). They came to Thiruvananthapuram and stayed there for a short while. After that, they stayed in Tanur. Finally, they came to Vadakara and settled there.

As a result of tolerance to Muslims and the esteem in which Muslim leaders and scholars were held by Zamorin rulers, Sayyids came to Malabar and started to settle there. Natives and rulers alike held them in high esteem and accepted them.

Since locals could not pronounce the Arabic names of all visitors who came and settled in Vadakara, they called them Valiya Seethi Thangal and Cheriya Seethi Thangal. The landlords of Valiyakath ancestral home gave a double-storied house, under their ownership in Thazhengadi, to Thangal brothers to live for free.

== In the spiritual world ==
Cheruseethi Thangal was initiated to Qadariya Tariqath by Sayyid Abdurahman Al Hydrose who came to Malabar from Hadhramaut in 1703 and whose final resting place is Valiyajarathingal at Ponnani.

In 1766, Tipu Sultan and his father Hyder Ali came to Kozhikode via Kadathanad. They came to Cheruseethi Thangal and sought his blessings. In 1770 Qutub Zaman Mouladaveela Mamburum Sayyid Alavi Thangal (1752–1845) came to Malabar and became the disciple of Cheruseethi Thangal.

== Demise ==
He died on A.H 1185 Jamad-ul-Awwal 17 (29 August 1771 C.E, Thursday).
