= Henry Valentine Conolly =

East India Company official (1806–1855)

Henry Valentine Conolly (5 December 1806 – 11 September 1855) was an East India Company official in the Madras Presidency who served as a District Collector of Malabar. He took an active role in the establishment of teak plantations to meet the demands for teak in shipbuilding. He was murdered in Calicut by Malabar Muslims for the actions he sought to take against their leader Sayid Fasal Pukkoya Tangal of Mampuram Mosque. Leaders of different regions held a meeting at the home of Palamadathil Puthupparambil Kunhali, a noble family head and philanthropist from Kuttoor, near Vengara, to discuss the protest and campaign against Conolly for his active role in the exile of Sayyid Fazal. Mandayappuram Mammadunni Mooppan and Veeranunni Mooppan also participated in the meeting.

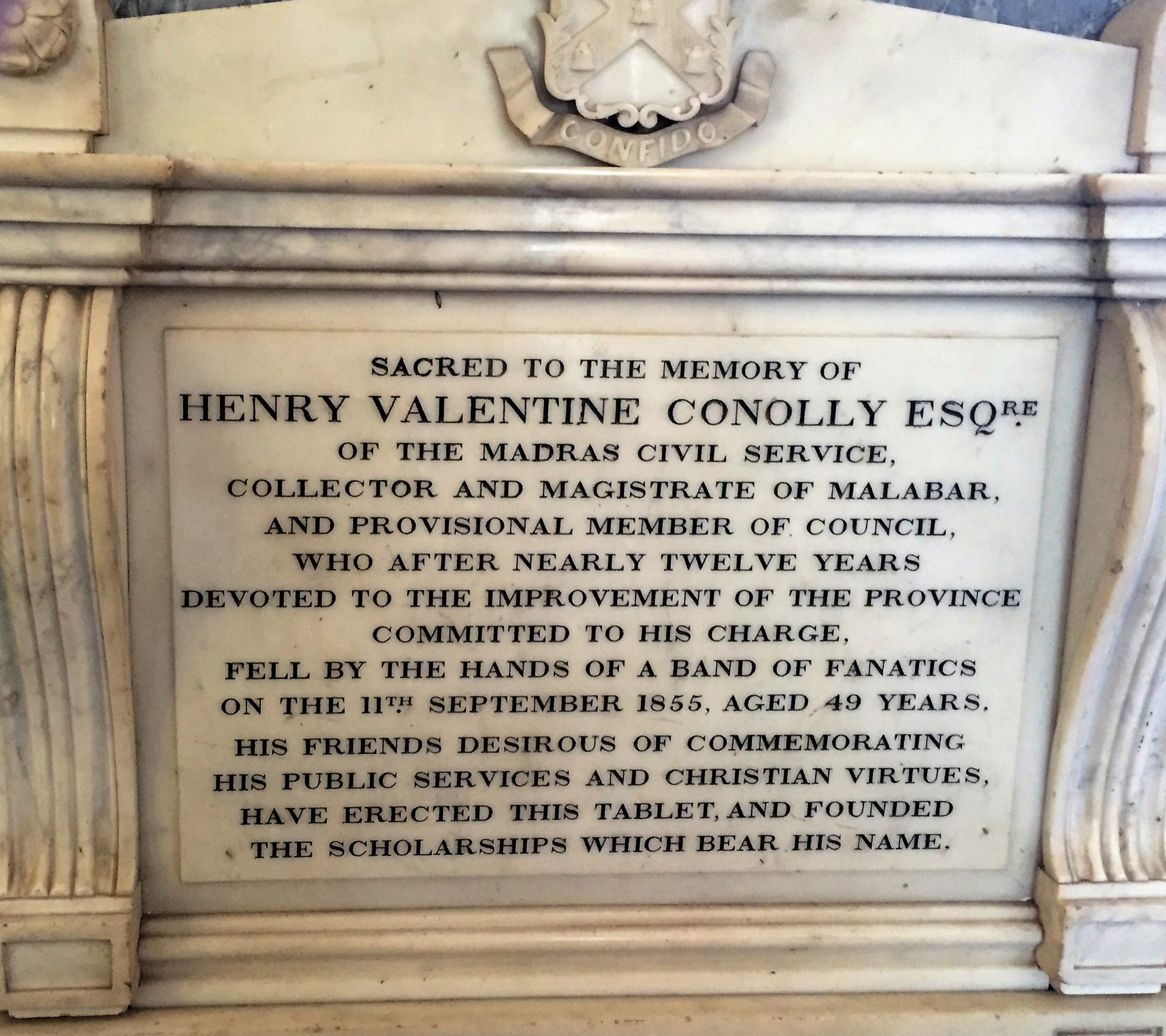
Henry Valentine Conolly Memorial at the St. George's Cathedral, Madras

== Early life ==
Henry Conolly was born on 5 December 1806 to Valentine Conolly of 37 Portland Place, London. He and his younger brother Arthur were educated at Rugby School, Warwickshire. Conolly then moved to Madras, and became a writer in the Madras Civil Service from 19 May 1824. He later served in Bellary as principal collector. He served as a translator of Kannada, a cashier and as commissioner for settlement of claims in the Carnatic region.

== Initiatives in India ==
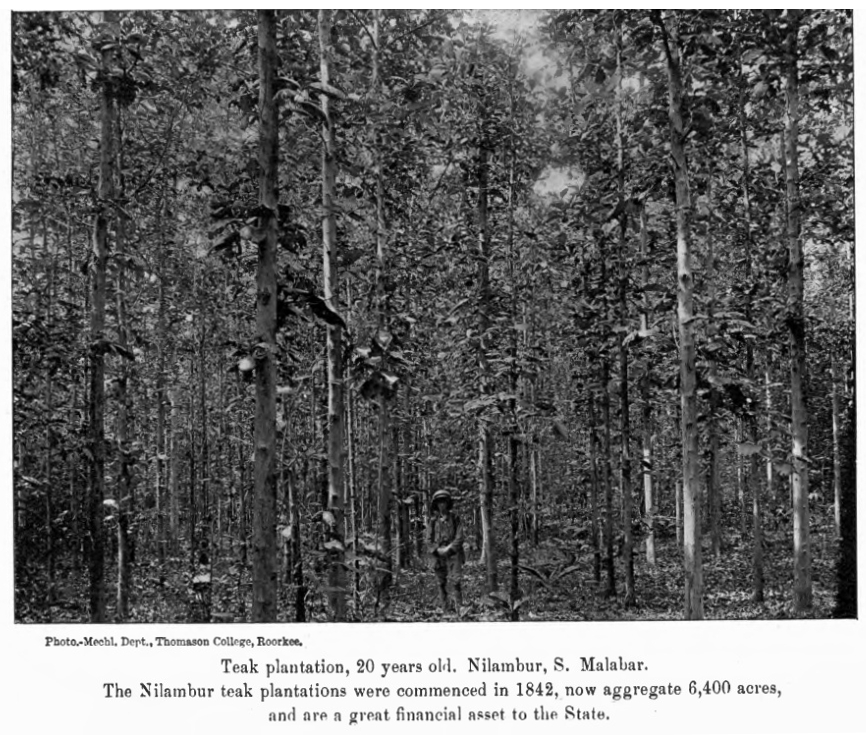
The Conolly Teak Plot - 2 km from Nilambur. The plot was named in memory of Henry Conolly, then Malabar District Collector

While District Collector of Malabar, Conolly helped develop teak plantations. The teak plantation was a pioneering example of systematic forest management. It contained some of the finest pieces of the tropical hardwood teak. The plantations were constructed by the Madras Government for the supply of teak timber to the port of Bombay. He is also remembered for his planning of a coastal waterway in Malabar in 1848—what is now known as the Conolly Canal (although the introduction of railways around the time the canal was being completed had eclipsed its importance).

== Death ==
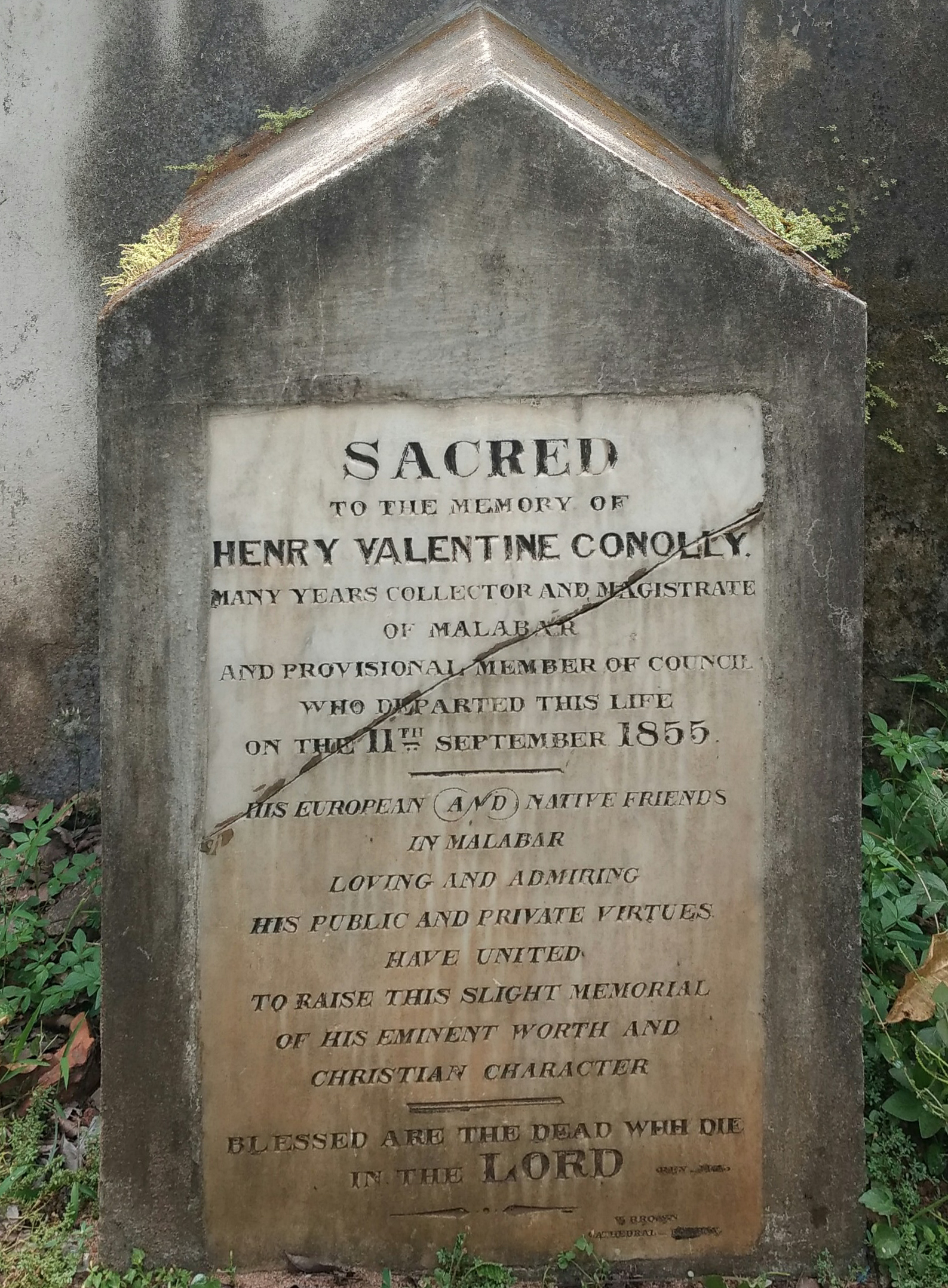
Conolly's tomb stone at Calicut

At about 9 p.m. on the evening of 11 September 1855, Conolly was attacked and killed at the Collector's Residence at West Hill Bungalow, Calicut by a small group of Mappilas. Conolly was buried in what is now Conolly Park, near South Beach Road; the headstone of his tomb was moved to the premises of the C.S.I. St. Mary's English Church, Calicut in 1997. The murderers, Valassery Emalu, Puliyankunnath Thenu (who had escaped from prison at Calicut a month before) and Haiderman, a hairdresser, were eventually tracked down and shot dead by government forces led by Major Haly and Captain Davis (in an encounter after 6 days at large at Edavannappara in Thiruvambadi). The Mappila rebels were using these escaped prisoners to murder Conolly, who had suggested exiling Fazal Pookoya Thangal of Mambrum.
