= Kakkad =

Kakkad may refer to:

- Kakkad, Malappuram, a town in Kerala, India, part of Tiruraangadi municipality
- Kakkad, Kannur, a suburb of Kannur city in Kerala, India, part of Kannur corporation
- Kakkad River or Kakkattar, a river in Kerala, India
- Kakkad in the Ernakulam district, Kerala, near Thiruvankulam
- Kakkad, Mukkam in Kozhikode district of Kerala, India, part of Karassery panchayath
