= Tirurangadi Muslim Orphanage =

Orphanage in Tirurangadi, Malappuram, India

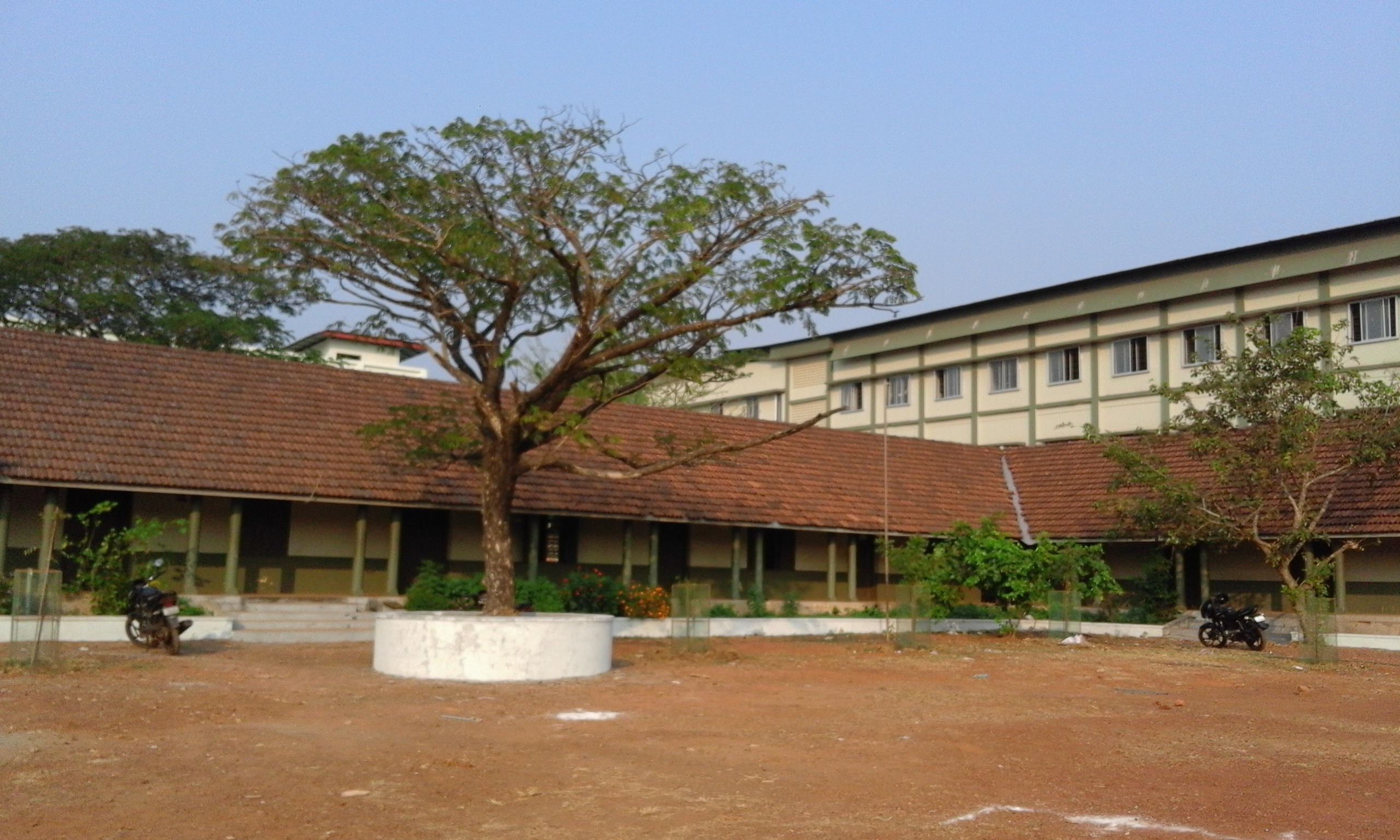
Old building of the orphanage

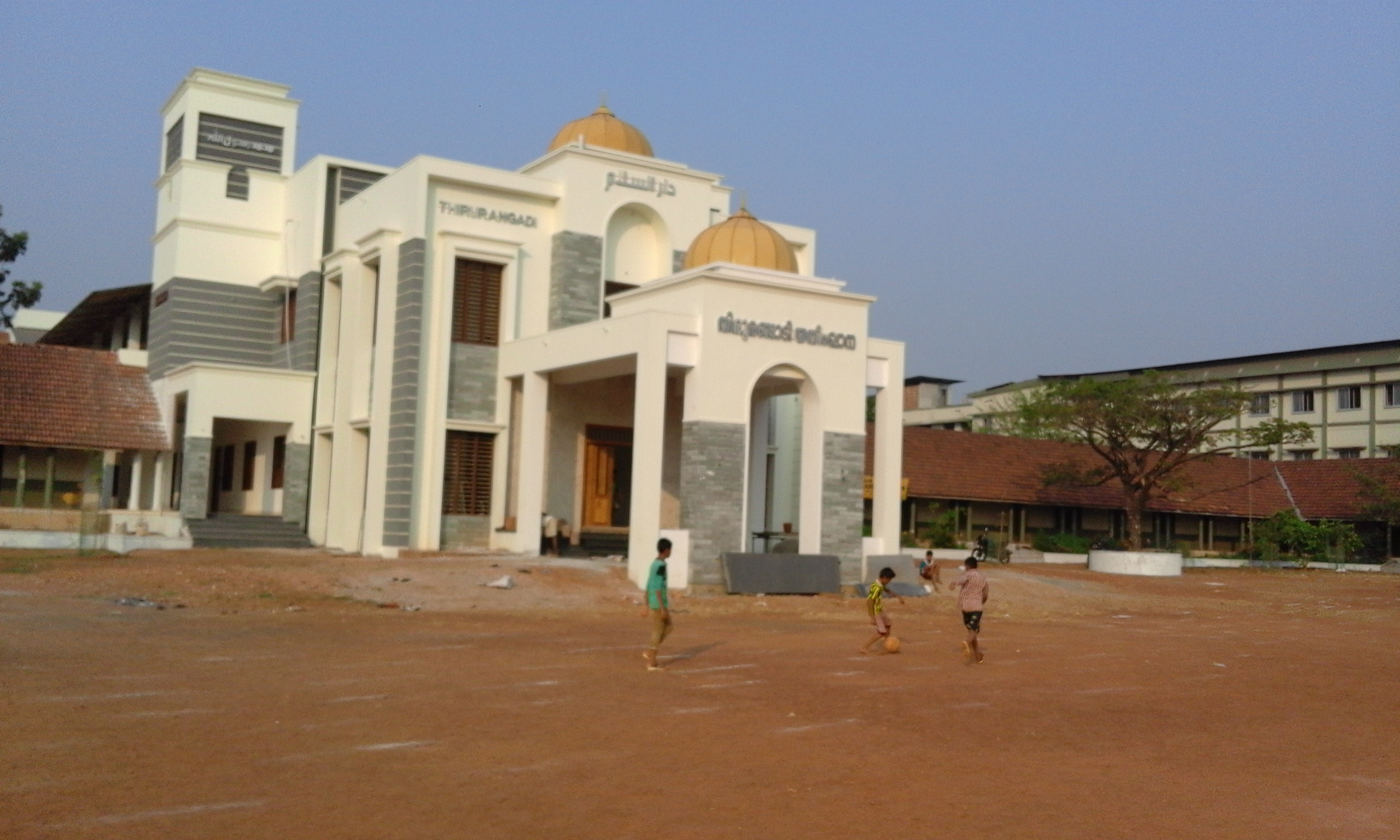
New building of the orphanage

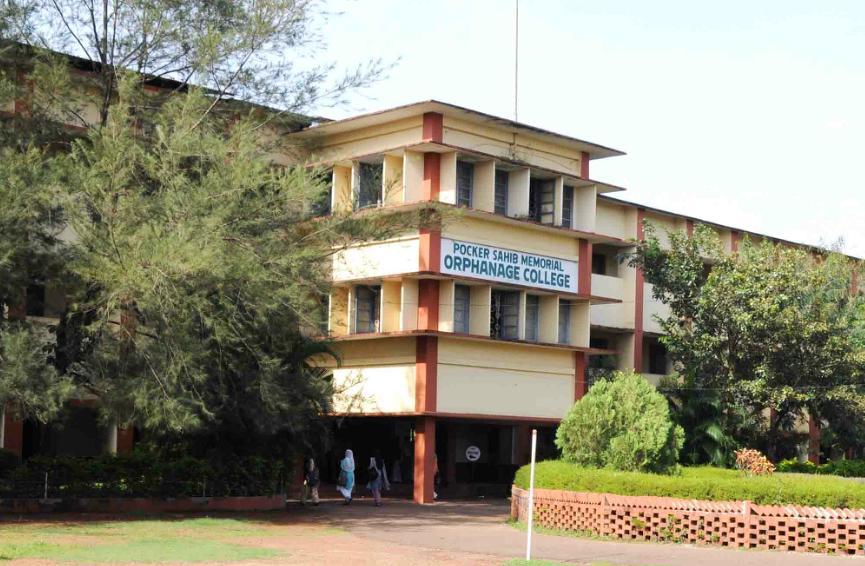
P.S.M.O.College, Tirurangadi

Tirurangadi Muslim Orphanage is an educational hub of ten educational organizations situated in and around Tirurangadi town in Malappuram district, Kerala, India. P.S.M.O.College is the biggest campus in the entire group.

== Location ==
The orphanage and other educational institutions are located at Saudabad in Tirurangadi, Malappuram District.

== History ==
The Noorul Islamic Madrasa was established in 1939 followed by the Oriental Higher Secondary School in 1955. The famous philanthropist M.K.Haji Sahib donated land for the orphanage and the Orphanage L.P.School was established in 1960. P.S.M.O. College was established in 1968. The Orphanage helped to relocate 114 orphans whose parents died in an outbreak of cholera in Malabar in 1943.

== Campus members ==
1. Pocker Sahib Memorial Orphanage College
2. Tirurangadi Yatheem Khana
3. Noorul Islam Madrasa
4. KMMMO Arabic College
5. Orphanage U.P.School
6. Oriental Higher Secondary School
7. SSMO Teacher Training Institute
8. Orphanage I.T.Center
9. MKH Orphanage Hospital
10. MKH School of Nursing

== See also ==
- PSMO College
- Tirurangadi
