= Kakkad, Malappuram =

Kakkad, is a growing town in Malappuram district, Kerala, India.

== Location ==
The town is located east of the Tirurangadi municipality. It is 2 kilometers away from Tirurangadi town.

== Transport ==
The nearest railway station is Parappanangadi and Tirur railway station. National Highway 66 (Old NH 17) is passing through the town.

== Education ==
The major educational institution in the town is GMUPS kakkad. It is established in 1912 and it is managed by the Department of Education. The school is co-educational and it have an attached pre-primary section. The school is non-residential in nature and is not using school building as a shift-school. During the previous academic year; the school functioned for 220 days. It had 10 academic inspections and was 1 time visited by the CRC Coordinator during the previous academic year. It was 1 time visited by the BRC Coordinator. Â Malayalam and English are the medium of instructions in this school. This school is approachable by all weather road. In this school academic session starts in June. The school is approachable by all weather road. School Management Committee (SMC) has been constituted in this school. The school has implemented continuous & comprehensive evaluation (CCE).The school is maintaining children's record as per RTE.The school has got computer in the school and all are functional. The school has computer aided learning lab. Teachers of school are well qualified as they have graduate & above degrees. The teachers are professionally qualified. The school was visited by the CRC Coordinator during the previous academic year. There are female teachers in the school. The school has got girls' toilet. The school has a comfortable Pupil-Teacher Ratio (PTR).The school is providing Mid-day meal.

== Religion ==
The major religions in the localities are Islam and Hinduism. Kakkad jumamasjid is the main devotional institute for Muslims and sree tripuraandhaka temple is the main devotional center for Hindus. kakkad MDS SUNNI madarassa and Mifthahul uloom Madrassa are the main islamic school in this area.

== Post office ==
Kakkad hosts a sub post office under tirurangadi area. 676306 is the postal code of post office location Kakkad.
