= Mamburam Makham Shareef =

Mosque in Malappuram, Kerala, India

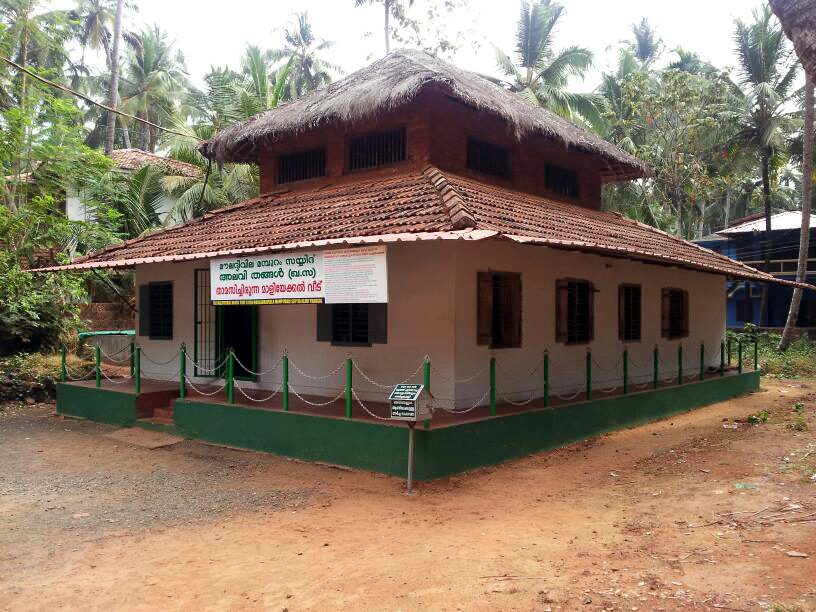
- Maliyekkal House, the former residence of Mampuram Thangal, pictured in 2014. The house is located within the mosque complex.

- Location within Kerala

Religion
- Affiliation: Sunni Islam
- Ecclesiastical or organisational status: Mosque and dargah
- Status: Active

Location
- Location: Tirurangadi, Malappuram, Kerala
- Country: India
- Coordinates: 11°2′30″N 76°4′46″E

Architecture
- Type: Mosque architecture
- Style: Kerala-Islamic; Vastu shastra
- Shrines: At least two: Sayyid Alavi Thangal and his wives; Sayyid Hasan Jifri

Website
- mampurammaqam.com

The Mampuram Mosque, also known as the Mampuram Maqam and the Tharammal Masjid, is a Sunni mosque and dargah complex, located in Tirurangadi, in the Malappuram district of the state of Kerala, India.

== Overview ==
The mosque was built in the Kerala-Islamic traditional Vastu shastra architectural style; and was extensively remodelled in 2004, maintaining its traditional style.

The dargah contains the grave of Sayyid Alavi Thangal and is a pilgrim centre of Sunni Muslims of Kerala; with approximately 5,000 visitors each day. A Swalath Majlis is conducted every Thursday at the dargah.

The Kaliyattakkavu Devi Temple, a Hindu temple, is located nearby, together with several other mosques, including the Muttichira Maqam, 6.3 kilometres (3.9 mi) away, the Kodinji Masjid, 7.2 kilometres (4.5 mi) away, and the Thirurangadi Juma Masjid, on the other side of the Kadalundipuzha River.

== Festivals ==
An Uroos is conducted from the first to the seventh of Muharram every year.

== See also ==
- Islam in India
- List of mosques in India
- List of mosques in Kerala
