= Fazal Pookoya Thangal =

Yemeni Islamic missionary and political activist (c. 1820 – 1901)

Pasha Habib Fazl Al-Husayni
- فضل با علوی پاشا
- Born: c. 1820; Mampuram, Malabar District, Madras Presidency, British India
- Died: 1901; Istanbul, Ottoman Empire
- Other names: Sayyid Fadl, Fadl Pasha
- Education: Hadith, fiqh, languages
- Occupations: Islamic missionary, political activist
- Years active: 1848–1901
- Era: British colonial rule in India
- Known for: Leading revolts against British rule in Malabar
- Movement: Mappila rebellion
- Opponent: British Raj
- Parents: Sayyid Alavi Thangal (father); Fathima Beevi (mother)

Habib Fazl Bin Alawi Mouladvīla Al Husayni Pasha alias Fazal Pookoya Thangal (Arabic: سيّدفضل بوكوي, Malayalam:സയ്യിദ് ഫസൽ പൂക്കോയ തങ്ങള്) (c. 1820 – 1901), also known as Sayyid Fadl and Fadl Pasha, was a Yemeni Islamic missionary and political activist who played a prominent role in the Mappila community of Kerala, India. He was the spiritual leader of Kerala Muslims as well as one of the pioneers of the Indian freedom movement. He belonged to a family of Sayyids who traced their lineage to Ali ibn Abi Talib through Mamburam Sayyid Alavi Mouladhavila. His father was Mamburam Sayyid Alavi Thangal, a Muslim mystic and political leader who had migrated from Hadramaut in Yemen to Malabar in 1798 CE (1183 AH) to spread Islam. After his father's death in 1845 CE (1261 AH), he succeeded him as the spiritual leader of Kerala Muslims.

== Early life and education ==
Fazal Pookoya Thangal was born in the 1820s in Mamburam, Malabar district, British India. His mother was Fathima Beevi, the daughter of Aboobacker Madani Koyalandi, a celebrated Muslim mystic leader. He received his primary education under the guidance of his father and learned the basics of Islamic sciences He also studied under various scholars and teachers who were associated with his father, such as Alhaji Chalilakath Kuday, Parapanangadi Aboobacker Koya Musliyar, Baithan Musliyar, Veliyankode Umar Khasi, Moideen Khazi, Calicut Khazi, Zainudeen Musliyar Thirurangadi and Sheikh Sayyid Abdulla Bin Umar. He acquired proficiency in Hadith, Fiqh, and languages such as Arabic, Persian and Malayalam. He also traveled to Mecca to pursue higher studies after his father's demise and returned to Kerala in 1848 CE (1264 AH).

== Political activism and rebellions ==
Fazal Pookoya Thangal was not only a religious leader but also a political activist who opposed the British colonial rule in India. He delivered sermons and speeches that inspired the Mappila Muslims to resist the oppression and injustice of the British authorities. He also supported the causes of the local rulers and chieftains who were fighting against the British expansion. He was involved in several rebellions and uprisings that took place in Malabar in the late 1840s and early 1850s.

== Manjeri revolt ==
In August 1849 CE (1265 AH), a revolt broke out in Manjeri, where the Mappila Muslims attacked the British troops and officials. This was a continuation of the earlier revolt that had occurred in 1844 CE (1260 AH) in the same place. Fazal Pookoya Thangal was accused of instigating the rebels and providing them with moral and material support. The British authorities arrested him and interrogated him, but they failed to get any evidence about his involvement in the revolt.

== Kulathur revolt ==
In 1851 CE (1267 AH), another revolt erupted in Kulathur, where the Mappila Muslims rose up against the British taxation and land policies. They also attacked the Hindu landlords who were allied with the British Fazal Pookoya Thangal was again suspected of being behind the rebellion and influencing the masses. The British historian William Logan recorded this incident as one of the three serious revolts that were suppressed by the British forces between 1849 and 1852 CE (1265 and 1268 AH) in his "Malabar Manual".

== Exile from Malabar ==
The British authorities decided to deport Fazal Pookoya Thangal from Malabar after the release of the T. L. Strange commission investigation report, which probed into the causes and consequences of the Mappila revolts. The district magistrate H. V. Conolly issued a warrant for his arrest in February 1852 CE (1268 AH). However, Fazal Pookoya Thangal managed to escape to Arabia before he could be captured. He settled in Istanbul, where he was welcomed by the Ottoman Empire as a guest of honor. He was given the title of Fadl Pasha by the Ottoman Sultan and lived a comfortable life with his family. He died in Istanbul in 1901 CE (1318 AH) and was buried there.

== Works ==
Fazal Pookoya Thangal was a prolific writer who authored several books and treatises on various topics related to Islam, history, politics, law, ethics, and spirituality. Some of his works are:

- "Uddathul Umara" Val Hukkam Li Ihanathil Kafarah va Abadathil Asnam" (عدة الامراء و الحكام لاهانة الكفرة و عبدة الاصنام) – A guide for rulers and judges on how to deal with infidels and idolaters.
- "Hulalul Ehsan Fee Thsyeenul Insane" ( حلال الاحسان في تحسين الانسان) – A book on ethics and human improvement
- "Asasul Islam fee Bayani Ahkem" (اساس الاسلام في بيان الاحكام) – A book on the fundamentals of Islam and its rulings.
- "Bavarikul Fathyana: lee Thaqviyathul Bihyana" (بوارك الفتيان لتقوية البنتيان) – A book on the virtues and duties of young men and women
- "Risalathul Muslim Ila Habir lee Edrakul Gabir" (رسالة المسلمين للحابر يدروغ الكبير) – A letter to a friend on how to understand the greatness of God
- "Ishafful Shafeeque fee Bayarakkelk" (اشعاف شفيق في بيارك) – A book on the biography and teachings of Shafi'i school of jurisprudence
- "Athareekul Hanafiy" (التاريخ الحنفية) – A book on the history and doctrines of Hanafi school of jurisprudence
- "Thadheerul Hqyar Aquar Min Rukubil Hari Vannur" (تظهير الحقيار من رقوب الحاري و النور ) – A book on the defense of the truth against the attacks of enemies and hypocrites
- "Vadhathul Umrah Val Hokum lee Ehanthil Kashrathi Vahabyathul Hayan" (وحدة العمرة و الحكوم ل للاعانة الكفرة) وعبودية العصيان) – A book on the unity of the community and the government for the assistance of the infidels and the servitude of disobedience
- "Edhah Ul Asrar" (اظهار الاسرار) – A book on the revelation of the secrets

== See also ==
- Mappila riots#Riot inciters
