= Alavi Thangal =

Sayyid Alawi Mawla al-Dawilah Mampuram Thangal
- Sayyid Alawi Mawla al-Dawilah Mampuram al-Husayni Thangal

Personal life
- Born: 1752 AD (1166 A.H) Tarim, the Kathiri State of Seiyun in Hadhramaut (modern Yemen)
- Died: 1845 AD (1260 A.H) Mampuram, Malabar, Madras State, British India
- Resting place: Mampuram, Kerala, India
- Spouse: Fatima, the daughter of Sayyid Hasan al-Jifri; Fatima, the daughter of Sayyid Abu Bakr al-Madani; A'isha, from Tanur; Swaliha, from Sile of Indonesia
- Children: Sayyida Alawiyya; Sayyida Sharifa; Sayyid Fadl; Sayyida Swaliha; Sayyida Fatima
- Parent: Sayyid Muhammad ibn Sahl al-Husayni (father)
- Relations: Alawi

Religious life
- Religion: Sunni Islam

Senior posting
- Successor: Fazal Pookoya Thangal

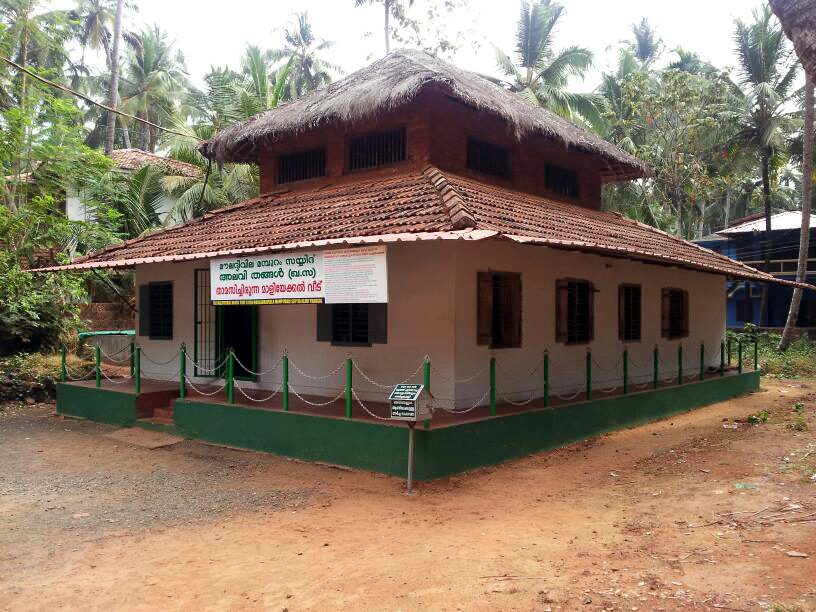
The house of Mampuram Thangal

Sayyid ʿAlawī Mawlā al-Dawīlah al-Ḥusaynī (1752–1845) was a Hadrami Islamic scholar who settled at Mampuram in Kerala, India. His tomb, also located in Mampuram, is considered one of the greatest pilgrimage centers in southern India. His son was Sayyid Fadl, also known as Fazal Pookoya Thangal.

== Early life ==
Thangal was a descendant of Husayn ibn Ali. His full genealogy is given as "Alawi ibn Muhammad ibn Sahl ibn Muhammad ibn Ahmad ibn Sulayman ibn Umar ibn Muhammad ibn Sahl ibn Abd al-Rahman ibn Abd Allah ibn Alawi ibn Muhammad Mawla al-Dawilah ibn Ali Mawla al-Darak ibn Alawi al-Ghayur ibn Muhammad al-Faqih al-Muqaddam ibn Ali ibn Muhammad Sahib al-Mirbath ibn Ali Khali Qasam ibn Alawi al-Thani ibn Muhammad ibn Alawi al-Awwal ibn Ubayd Allah ibn Ahmad al-Muhajir ibn Isa al-Rumi ibn Muhammad al-Naqib ibn Ali al-Uraydi ibn Ja'far al-Sadiq ibn Muhammad al-Baqir ibn Ali Zayn al-Abidin ibn Husayn ibn Ali ibn Abi Talib". His family came from Tarim of Hadhramaut, where they were regarded as prominent spiritual leaders in their community. Sayyid Alavi was born to Sayyid Muhammad bin Sahl al-Husayni and Fatima in Hijri 1166 (AD 1752) in Tarim, Kathiri State of Seiyun in Hadhramaut (modern Yemen). His maternal aunt took care of him during his early childhood.

== Education ==
Thangal memorized the Quran by the age of eight and became fluent in the Arabic language. His primary education was in his hometown of Tarim from the school of the Shaykh.

== In Malabar ==
His uncles, Hasan al-Jifri and Shaykh al-Jifri, left for Malabar for the sake of propagation and influenced the natives of Malabar. At the age of 17, Sayyid left Mukalla for the coast of Malabar by ship and reached Calicut in Hijra 1183 Ramadan 19. Later, he settled in Mambaram (formerly Mamburam Thangal) and Arabi Thangal. He became famous after he had done it during the early period of his settlement in Malabar. He predicted the arrival of communism in Kerala, even before the writings of the Communist Manifesto. He said to his disciple Avukoya about future events: When the British leave the country, our people will be in danger and will be affected by poverty in their lives and poverty in their spirituality.

== Family life ==
Sayyid Alavi married Fatima, daughter of Hasan al-Jifri, in 1183 Hijra. He stayed for a short period in his bride's house but later shifted to a permanent Maliyekkal house near Mamburam Juma Masjid. He had two daughters with his spouse: Sayyida Alawiyya and Sayyida Sharifa, the latter of whom was also known as Kunhi beevi. After Fatima's death, he married the daughter of Sayyid Abu Bakr al-Madani of Kovilkandi Ambarkand of Koyilandy, also named Fatima. He had one son in this relationship, Sayyid Fadl. At the age of 50, he married A'isha from Tanur and had two more daughters, Sayyida Swaliha and Sayyida Fatima. After the death of his third wife, he married Swaliha from Indonesia.

== Spiritualism ==
Sayyid Alavi followed the Ba 'Alawiyya Tariqa, sub-branch of Qadiriyya Tariqa, related to the saint Abdul Qadir Gilani. He was recognized as Qutb al-Zaman (leader of Wali's, saint of the century) by Sunni Islam. He suggested spiritual treatment for his disciples as well as infidels that consulted him. He was consulted for personal and social issues and was considered the greatest leader on the horizon of the spiritual world. There was a huge crowd follower for this prodigy. He provided elas (chain consisted of some divine things).

== Sayyid Alavi in the path of struggle ==
When the Mappilas attacked under the guidance of Sayyid Alavi, the British government felt threatened. Sayyid Alavi provided soldiers with guns and sophisticated weapons to arm the new generation for war. He was the founder of Cherur pada and inspired youngsters to fight against the British government.

== Death ==
Sayyid Alavi Mawla al-Dawilah became ill in 1259 (Hijri) following an injury to his leg. Many doctors and vaidyars treated him, but he died on Sunday 1260 (Hijri) Muharram 7 (AD 1845) in Malabar, Madras State, British India. He was buried in Mambaram.
