= Wandoor Assembly constituency =

Constituency of the Kerala legislative assembly in India

Coordinates: 11.20°N 76.23°E

Wandoor
- Constituency No. 36 for the Kerala Legislative Assembly
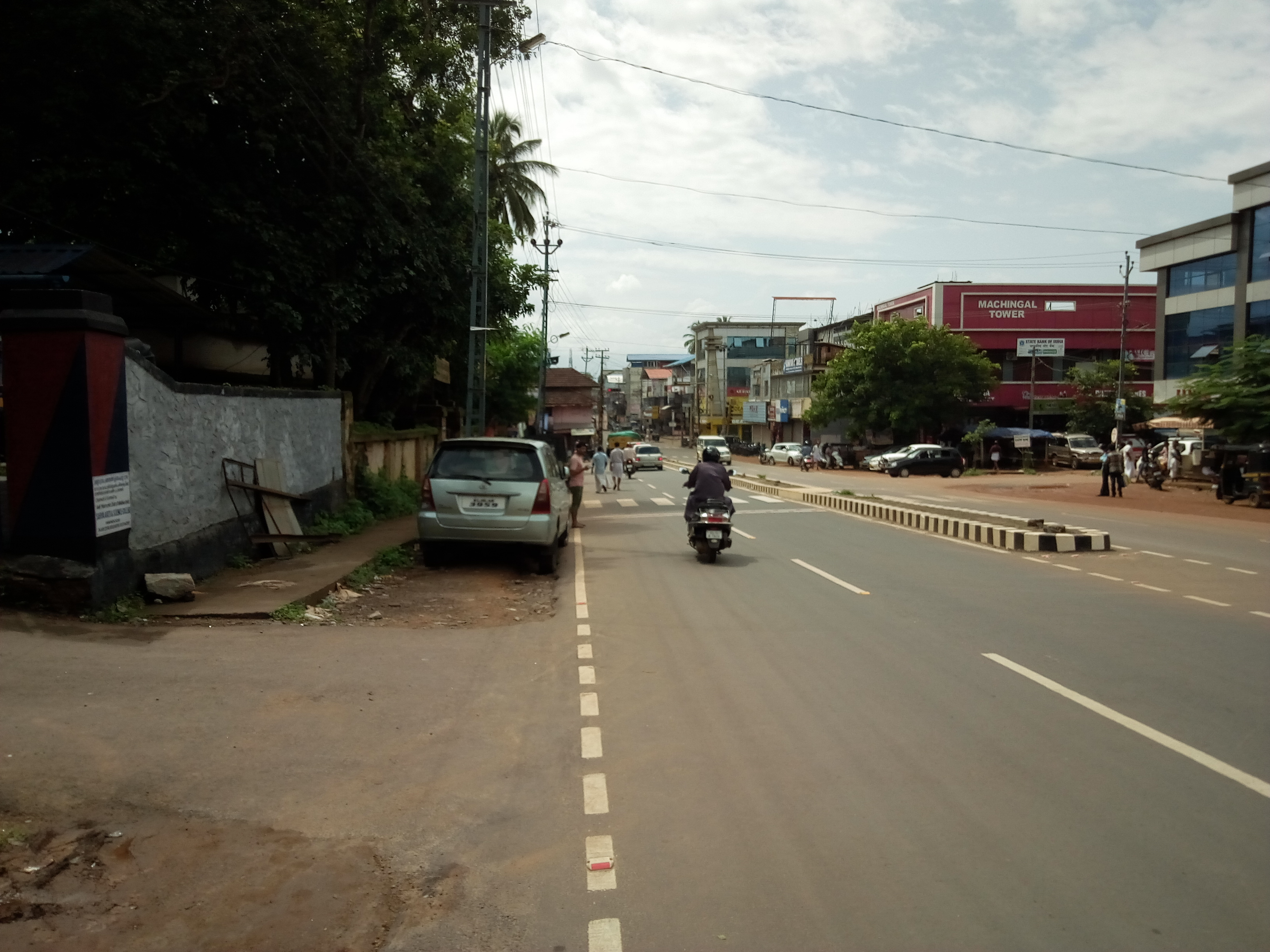
- Wandoor

Constituency details
- Country: India
- Region: South India
- State: Kerala
- District: Malappuram
- Established: 1977
- Total electors: 2,26,426 (2021)
- Reservation: SC

Member of Legislative Assembly
- 16th Kerala Legislative Assembly
- Incumbent A. P. Anil Kumar
- Party: INC
- Alliance: UDF
- Elected year: 2026

Wandoor State assembly constituency is one of the 140 state legislative assembly constituencies in Kerala in southern India. It is also one of the seven state legislative assembly constituencies included in Wayanad Lok Sabha constituency. As of the 2026 Assembly elections, the current MLA is A. P. Anil Kumar of INC.

== Local self-governed segments ==
Wandoor Assembly constituency is composed of the following local self-governed segments:

Sl no.	Name	Status (Grama panchayat/Municipality)	Taluk
1	Wandoor	Grama panchayat	Nilambur
2	Mampad	Grama panchayat	Nilambur
3	Thiruvali	Grama panchayat	Nilambur
4	Chokkad	Grama panchayat	Nilambur
5	Kalikavu	Grama panchayat	Nilambur
6	Karuvarakundu	Grama panchayat	Nilambur
7	Thuvvoor	Grama panchayat	Nilambur
8	Porur	Grama panchayat	Nilambur

Wandoor Assembly constituency

== Members of the Legislative Assembly ==
The following list contains all members of Kerala Legislative Assembly who have represented Wandoor Assembly constituency during the period of various assemblies:

Year	Name	Party
1977	Vella Eacharan	Indian National Congress
1980	M. A. Kuttappan	Indian National Congress
1982	Pandalam Sudhakaran	Indian National Congress
1987	Pandalam Sudhakaran	Indian National Congress
1991	Pandalam Sudhakaran	Indian National Congress
1996	N. Kannan	Communist Party of India (Marxist)
2001	A. P. Anil Kumar	Indian National Congress
2006	A. P. Anil Kumar	Indian National Congress
2011	A. P. Anil Kumar	Indian National Congress
2016	A. P. Anil Kumar	Indian National Congress
2021	A. P. Anil Kumar	Indian National Congress
2026	A. P. Anil Kumar	Indian National Congress

== Election results ==
Percentage change (±) denotes the change in the number of votes from the immediate previous election.

=== 2026 ===
There were registered voters in the constituency for the 2026 Kerala Assembly election.

2026 Kerala Legislative Assembly election: Wandoor
Party	Candidate	Votes	%	±%
INC	A. P. Anil Kumar	121,074	59.59	▲8.15
CPI(M)	Dr. K. K. Damodaran	73,135	36.00	▼6.28
BJP	E. P. Kumaradas	6,018	2.96	▼1.19
Independent	Anilkumar S/o Kuttan	1,267	0.62	−
NOTA	None of the above	1,674	0.82	▲0.43
Margin of victory		47,939	23.60	▲14.44
Turnout		2,03,168		
INC hold		Swing	▲8.30	

=== 2021 ===
There were 2,26,426 registered voters in the constituency for the 2021 Kerala Assembly election.

2021 Kerala Legislative Assembly election: Wandoor
Party	Candidate	Votes	%	±%
INC	A. P. Anil Kumar	87,415	51.44	▼1.15
CPI(M)	P. Midhuna	71,852	42.28	▲5.00
BJP	Dr. P. C. Vijayan	7,057	4.15	▼1.93
WPOI	Krishnan. C	2,943	1.73	▼0.45
NOTA	None of the above	664	0.39	▼0.13
Margin of victory		15,563	9.16	▼6.15
Turnout		1,69,931	75.05	▲0.89
INC hold		Swing	▼1.15	

=== 2016 ===
There were 2,10,149 registered voters in Wandoor Assembly constituency for the 2016 Kerala Assembly election.

2016 Kerala Legislative Assembly election: Wandoor
Party	Candidate	Votes	%	±%
INC	A. P. Anil Kumar	81,964	52.59	▼5.91
CPI(M)	K. Nishanth	58,100	37.28	▲0.59
BJP	Sunitha Mohandas	9,471	6.08	▲3.90
WPOI	Krishnan Kuniyil	3,399	2.18	−
SDPI	Krishnan Eranhikkal	1,178	0.76	▼0.51
PDP	Velayudhan Venniyur	920	0.59	−
NOTA	None of the above	808	0.52	−
Margin of victory		23,864	15.31	▼6.50
Turnout		1,55,840	74.16	▲0.78
INC hold		Swing	▼5.91	

=== 2011 ===
There were 1,80,715 registered voters in the constituency for the 2011 election.

2011 Kerala Legislative Assembly election: Wandoor
Party	Candidate	Votes	%	±%
INC	A. P. Anil Kumar	77,580	58.50	
CPI(M)	V. Rameshan	48,661	36.69	
BJP	Kotheri Ayyapan	2,885	2.18	
SDPI	Krishnan Eranhikkal	1,682	1.27	
Independent	P. Anil Kumar	953	0.72	
Independent	T. C. Theyyan	849	0.64	
Margin of victory		28,919	21.81	
Turnout		1,32,610	73.38	
INC hold		Swing		

== See also ==
- Wandoor
- Malappuram district
- List of constituencies of the Kerala Legislative Assembly
- 2016 Kerala Legislative Assembly election
