= N. Kannan =

Indian politician

Member of Legislative Assembly, Kerala
- In office 1996–2001
- Preceded by: Pandalam Sudhakaran
- Succeeded by: A. P. Anil Kumar
- Constituency: Wandoor

Personal details
- Born: 12 October 1955 (age 70) Malappuram, Kerala, India
- Party: Communist Party of India (Marxist)

N. Kannan was the former Member of Legislative Assembly from Wandoor (State Assembly constituency). In the 10th Kerala Legislative Assembly, he represented Wandoor constituency from 1996-2001. He is the only communist leader who marked a victory in Wandoor (State Assembly constituency).

== Life ==
N Kannan was born to N. Chathan and P Kali on 12 October 1955. He is married to Ajitha Ikkaden. He has two sons, Arjun and Abhinav.

== Political career ==
The active involvement in Kerala State Youth Federation (KSYF) made Kannan a political activist. KSYF is the precursor to Democratic Youth Federation of India. He was elected as the Panchayat Joint Secretary of KSYF. He then moved on to Kerala State Karshaka Thozhilali Union (KSKTU) affiliated or Kerala Agricultural Workers Union. He was the Panchayat Secretary of Trikkalangode unit of KSKTU and later became Area Secretary of Wandoor unit. He was also the former Malappuram District President of KSKTU. Currently, he is the state committee member of Kerala State Karshaka Thozhilali Union.

He has held the office of district president of Pattikajathi Kshema Samithi (PKS), a Dalit outfit of CPI(M) in Kerala. He is now the state committee member of PKS. He is also the area secretary of CPI(M) in Wandoor and the district committee member of Malappuram committee.

In 1988, N Kannan was elected as the Member of Trikkalangode Panchayat. In 1990, he was elected to the District Council of Malappuram from Wandoor division. From 1995-2000, he was elected to the Malappuram District Panchayat from Trikkalangode division. In 1996, he was elected to the Kerala Legislative Assembly from Wandoor. He got defeated to A.P Anil Kumar of Indian National Congress. He was elected as the President of Thiruvali Gram Panchayat from 2005-10. He is currently the member of both Nilambur Land Board and Malappuram district SC and ST welfare committee.

No.	Year	Constituency	Winner	Votes	Political Party	Runner-up	Votes	Political Party	Margin
1	1996	Wandoor (State Assembly constituency)	N Kannan	55399	CPI(M)	Pandalam Sudhakaran	51198	Indian National Congress	4201
2	2001	Wandoor (State Assembly constituency)	A.P. Anilkumar	80059	Indian National Congress	N Kannan	51834	CPI(M)	28225
