= Karunalaya Hospital =

Geography
- Location: Kerala, India

Organisation
- Type: General

History
- Opened: 1958

Links
- Lists: Hospitals in India

Karunalaya Hospital was a hospital in Wandoor in the state of Kerala in Southern India. It was noted in the early years for its treatment of poison, and it closed in 2003 due to lack of funds and mismanagement, however, due to the work of the Malabar Mission Society, it has been in the process of reopening since 2023.

The hospital was built around 1958 by Rev. Henry Otten.

== Facilities ==
The hospital staff consists of three physicians who look after patients and organize health camps, workshops and provide care in several villages .
