= Pellissery =

Pellissery is a Malayali surname. Notable people with the surname include:

- Jose Pellissery (1950–2004), Indian film and theatre actor
- Lijo Jose Pellissery (born 1978), Indian filmmaker and actor

== See also ==
- Pallissery
