= Thandukode =

Thandukode Thandukodu
- village
- Location in Kerala, India Thandukode (India)
- Coordinates: 11°09′57.4″N 76°17′59.3″E
- Country: India
- State: Kerala
- District: Malappuram

Population (2001)
  - Total: 1,795

Languages
  - Official: Malayalam, English
- Time zone: UTC+5:30 (IST)
- PIN: 679327
- Vehicle registration: KL-71

Thandukode is a village beside Madumala in Kalikavu Panchayat, Nilambur taluk in Malappuram district in the state of Kerala. The village consists of an LP school, Madrassa, temple and mosques. Political activities are very active; the leading parties are IUML, Congress and CPI (M). Popular religious organisations are Wisdom Youth, SKSSF, SSF.

== History ==
People began to settle in this village in the 1890s. Main families are Poonthiruthy (those who came from Ponmala) and Mancheri Kurikkal (those who came from Manjeri, Aanappettathu and Pottayil). Britishers cleared the Madumala Forest and planted the rubber tree. 85% of the population is Muslims, 10% Dalits and 5% others. Main Language spoken is Malayalam, literacy rate: 100%

== Culture ==
Thandukode village is a predominantly Muslim populated area, hence the culture is orientated to that religion. Duff Muttu, Kolkali and Aravanamuttu are common folk arts of this locality. There are many libraries attached to mosques giving a rich source of Islamic studies. Most of the books are written in Arabi-Malayalam which is a version of the Malayalam language written in Arabic script. People gather in mosques for the evening prayer and continue to sit there after the prayers discussing social and cultural issues. Business and family issues may also be sorted out during these evening meetings. The Hindu minority of this area keeps their rich traditions by celebrating various festivals in their temples. Hindu rituals are done here with a regular devotion like other parts of Kerala. The people of village still maintain strongly the relation among different religions.

== Transportation ==
Thandukode village connects to other parts of India through Nilambur town. State Highway No.28 starts from Nilambur and connects to Ooty, Mysore and Bangalore through Highways 12, 29 and 181. National highway No.66 passes through Ramanattukara and the northern stretch connects to Goa and Mumbai. The southern stretch connects to Cochin and Trivandrum. The nearest airport is located at Kozhikode. The nearest major railway stations are at Thodikappulam and Vaniyambalam.

== Agriculture ==
Rubber is the primary agricultural product, occupying a significant portion of the total plantation area. Rubber cultivation began after independence, as British colonial authorities restricted its cultivation by requiring special permits. Other notable crops include coconut, arecanut, and tapioca. In addition to crop farming, there are also poultry and fish farming activities in the region.

== Industry ==
There are small scale industry owned by Kunjani, son of Mohammed Ali, and Akbar Kunnath which focuses home industrial works.

== Education ==
Thandukode is a village with 100 percent literacy. There is an Anganwadi and LP school for primary education. The students depends on CHSS Adakkakundu, GUPS Kalikavu and St. Francis School for higher studies. The nearest college is Dr. Gafoor Memorial MES Mampad College. Several Doctors of Philosophy live there, including Mohammed Salman, Muhammed Junais, Nabeel Ajmal, Haris and a veterinary surgeon named Jamsheer.
