= Puttamanna =

- Village
- Puttamanna Junction
- Interactive map of Puttamanna
- Coordinates: 11.171982°N 76.310793°E
- Country: India
- State: Kerala
- District: Malappuram

Languages
  - Official: Malayalam, English
- Time zone: UTC+5:30 (IST)
- PIN: 676525
- Telephone code: 04931
- Vehicle registration: KL-71/ KL-10

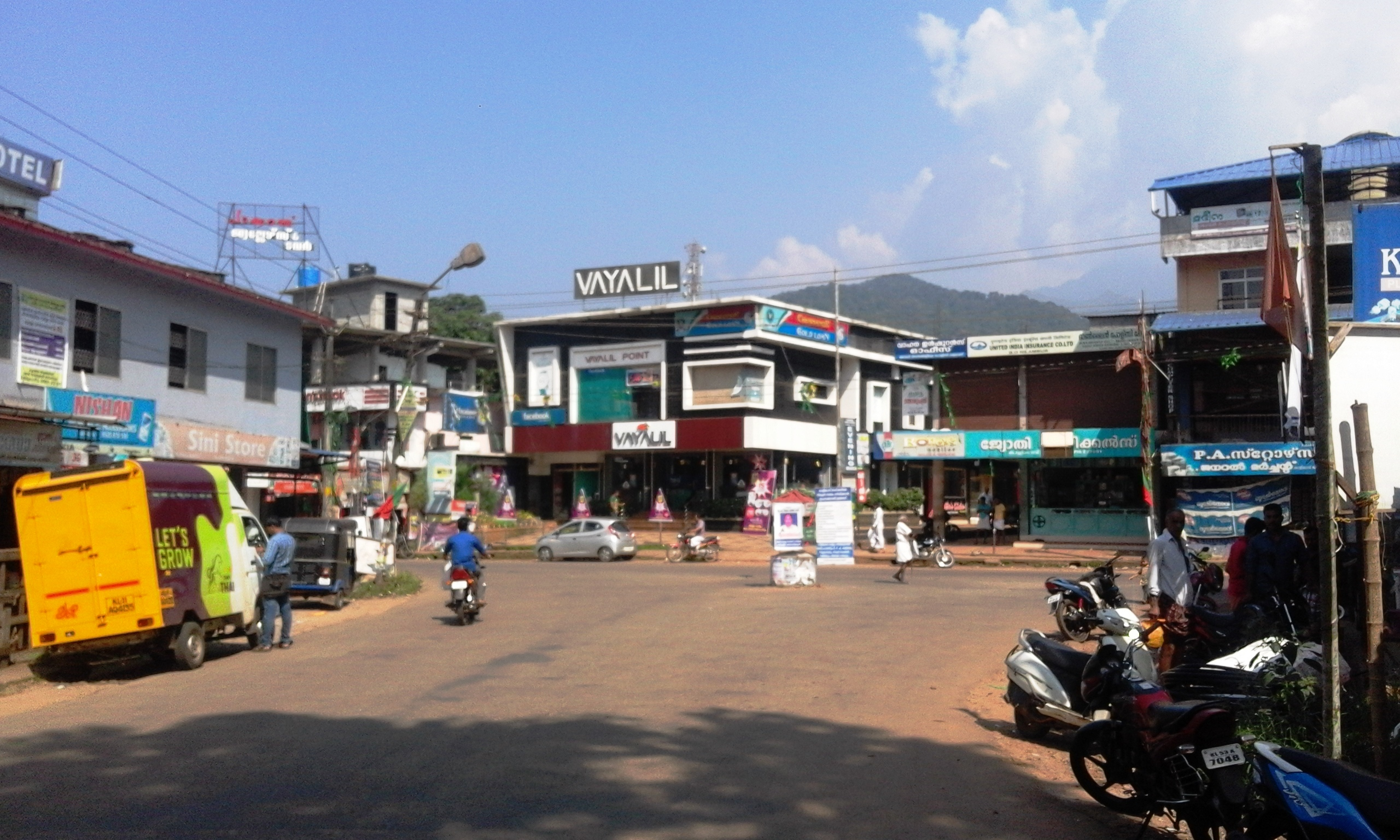
Puttamanna Bus stop

Puttamanna is a village in Kalikavu Panchayat, Nilambur taluk in Malappuram district in the state of Kerala. . It is situated 31 kilometres (19 miles) from Manjeri 36 kilometres (22 miles) from Perintalmanna and 9 kilometres (5.6 miles) each from Karuvarakundu and Tuvvur. A stream flows through the village, which is a tributary of the Chaliyar.

== Culture ==
Puttamanna village is a predominantly Muslim populated area. Hindus exist in comparatively smaller numbers. So the culture of the locality is based upon Muslim traditions. Duff Muttu, Kolkali and Aravanamuttu are common folk arts of this locality. Puttamanna has a historical background as well. Our ancestors had taken part in the Great Indian Freedom fight and especially in 1921 Mappila Revolution with great enthusiasm and passion. They were famous for their bravery and dedication. Like any other Malappuram village Puttamanna is also passionate towards soccer.

Puttamanna FC 2016

== Transportation ==
Puttamanna village connects to other parts of India through Nilambur town. State Highway No.28 starts from Nilambur and connects to Ooty, Mysore and Bangalore through Highways.12,29 and 181. National highway No.66 passes through Ramanattukara and the northern stretch connects to Goa and Mumbai. The southern stretch connects to Cochin and Trivandrum. State. The nearest airport is at Calicut International Airport. The nearest railway station are at vaniyambalam, Nilambur Road railway station and Tuvvur

== Suburbs and Villages ==
- Puttamanna Masjid Bridge
- Puttamanna Junction (down&up)

== Important Landmarks ==
- PFC Arts&Sports Club
- Hira Masjid
- Best Bakery
- Badriyya College
