= Amappoyil, Kalikavu =

Indian village

Amappoyil is a village in Kalikavu Panchayat, Nilambur taluk in Malappuram district in the state of Kerala.

== Location ==
The nearest airport is Calicut International Airport (67 km) and the nearest railway station is Vaniyambalam Railway Station.

Vellayoor PO, Kalikavu, 679 327 Malappuram

== Culture ==
Like most other villages in Malappuram district, ammappoyil village is also a predominantly Muslim populated area. But the population of Hindus and Christian's contribute more than 60%. So the culture of the locality is mostly secular in which all religions contribute. All the celebrations of three religions bear testimony to this and iftar parties during Ramzan, Sadya during Onam and Christmas are common.

Traditionally, Congress MLAs represent the area in Legislative assembly. Kalikavu panchayath is ruled by both LDF and UDF alternatively which is another testimony of the secular credentials of the area.

Amapoyil is a harmonious area withno history of communal or political clashes. Endowed with lush green natural beauty, the area embodies a peaceful living synergistic with the soul of nature.

== Transportation ==
Ammapoyil village connects to other parts of India through Nilambur town. State Highway No.28 starts from Nilambur and connects to Ooty, Mysore and Bangalore through Highways.12,29 and 181. National highway No.66 passes through Ramanattukara and the northern stretch connects to Goa and Mumbai. The southern stretch connects to Cochin and Trivandrum. State. The nearest airport is at Kozhikode. The nearest major railway station is at Feroke.
