= Pariyangadu =

Pariyangadu Mannattupara
- village
- Location in Kerala, India Pariyangadu (India)
- Coordinates: 11°6′0″N 76°17′0″E
- Country: India
- State: Kerala
- District: Malappuram

Population (2001)
  - Total: 26,795

Languages
  - Official: Malayalam, English
- Time zone: UTC+5:30 (IST)
- PIN: 676525
- Vehicle registration: KL-

Pariyangadu is a village near Anchachavadi in Kalikavu Panchayat, Nilambur taluk in Malappuram district in the state of Kerala. The total population is 26,795.

== Culture ==
Pariyangadu village is a predominantly Muslim populated area. Hindus exist in comparatively smaller numbers. So the culture of the locality is based upon Muslim traditions. Duff Muttu, Kolkali and Aravanamuttu are common folk arts of this locality. There are many libraries attached to mosques giving a rich source of Islamic studies. Most of the books are written in Arabi-Malayalam which is a version of the Malayalam language written in Arabic script. People gather in mosques for the evening prayer and continue to sit there after the prayers discussing social and cultural issues. Business and family issues are also sorted out during these evening meetings. The Hindu minority of this area keeps their rich traditions by celebrating various festivals in their temples. Hindu rituals are done here with a regular devotion like other parts of Kerala.

== Transportation ==
Pariyangadu village connects to other parts of India through Nilambur town. State Highway No.28 starts from Nilambur and connects to Ooty, Mysore and Bangalore through Highways.12,29 and 181. National highway No.66 passes through Ramanattukara and the northern stretch connects to Goa and Mumbai. The southern stretch connects to Cochin and Trivandrum. State. The nearest airport is at Kozhikode. The nearest major railway station is at Feroke.
