= Poongode =

Village in Kerala, India

Poongode is a small village located in Kalikavu Panchayat, Nilambur taluk within the Malappuram district of Kerala. The village is known for its unique sense of community cooperation. The majority of the population is Muslim and Hindu. Nethaji Arts & Sports Club is one of the oldest football teams based here. The G.L.P school poongode, situated about 300 meters from the town also features a football stadium.

Additionally, Nethaji Vayanashala in Poongode offers books and news for the community to access and engage.

== Culture ==
Poongode village is a predominantly Muslim populated area, with Hindus forming a smaller minority. As a result, the local culture is largely influenced by Muslim traditions. Duff muttu, kolkali and aravana muttu are common folk arts of this locality. There are many libraries attached to mosques giving a rich source of Islamic studies. Most of the books are written in Arabi Malayalam which is a version of the Malayalam language written in Arabic script.

In the evenings, people gather at mosques for prayer, often staying afterwards to discuss social and cultural issues. Business and family issues are also sorted out during these evening meetings. Despite being a minority, the Hindu community in Poongode preserves its cultural heritage by celebrating various festivals in their temples. Hindu rituals are practiced here with the same devotion seen across other parts of Kerala.

== Transportation ==
Poongode village connects to other parts of India through Nilambur town. State Highway No.28 begins at Nilambur and connects to Ooty, Mysore, and Bangalore through Highways 12, 29 and 181. National highway No. 66 passes through Ramanattukara, with the northern stretch leading to Goa and Mumbai, and the southern stretch connecting to Cochin and Trivandrum. The nearest airport is located in Kozhikode, and the nearest major railway station is in Feroke.
