= Wandoor Siva Temple =

Temple in Wandoor, Kerala, India

- Siva Temple, Wandoor, Malappuram, Kerala

Religion
- Affiliation: Hinduism
- District: Malappuram
- Deity: Shiva
- Festival: Maha Shivaratri

Location
- Location: Wandoor
- State: Kerala
- Country: India
- Interactive map of Wandoor Siva Temple
- Coordinates: 11.204511°N 76.232247°E

Architecture
- Type: Architecture of Kerala

Specifications
- Temple: One
- Elevation: 59.28 m (194 ft)

Wandoor Siva Temple is a temple located at Wandoor (also known as Vandur), a town in Malappuram district in the state of Kerala, India. This temple is an old temple, which holds a spiritual atmosphere around the temple. The Temple has a big pond, where the devotees purify themselves.
