= A. P. Anil Kumar =

Indian politician

A.P. Anil Kumar
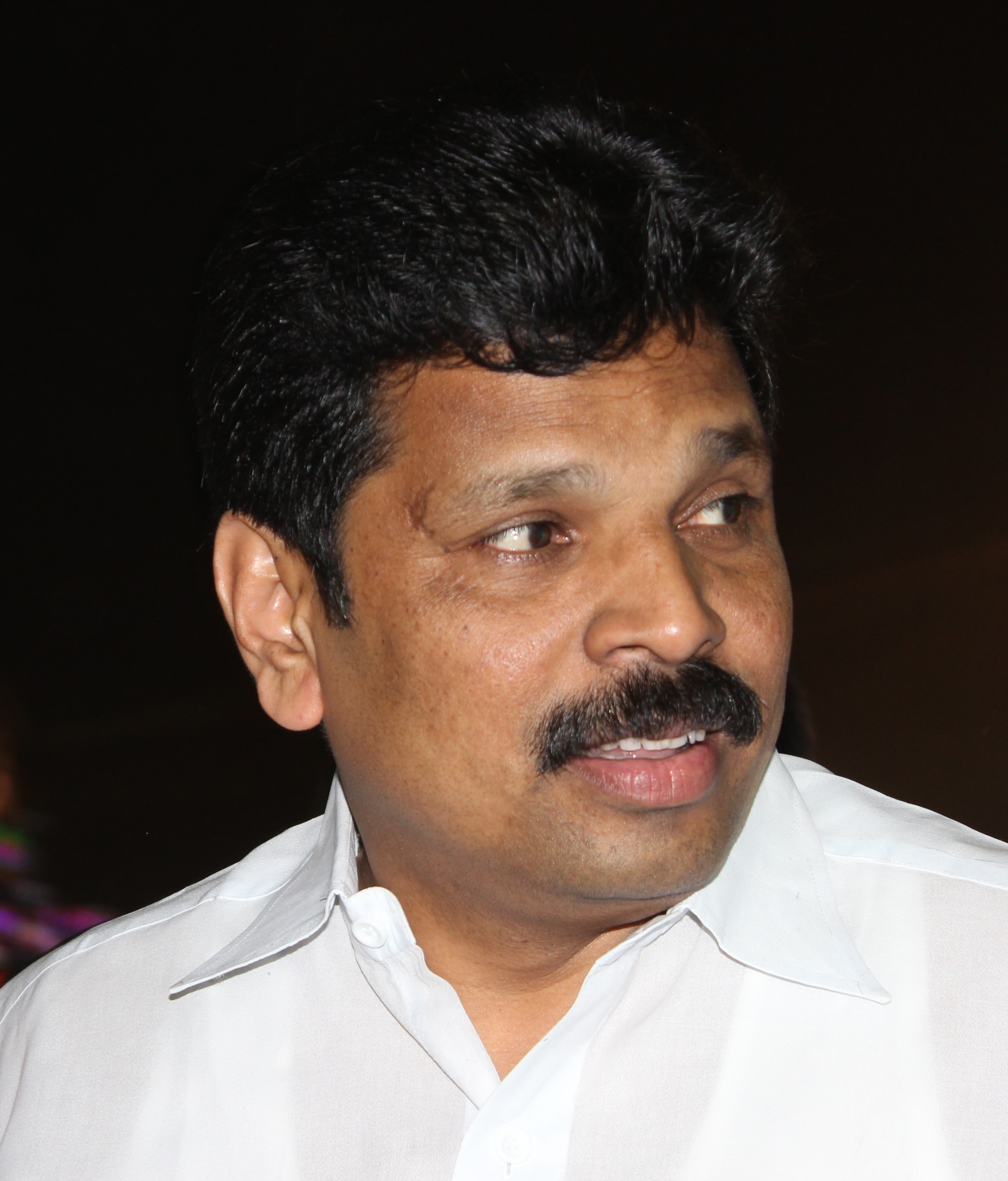

Minister for Revenue, Government of Kerala
- Incumbent
- Assumed office 18 May 2026
- Governor: Om Prakash Mathur
- Chief Minister: V. D. Satheesan
- Portfolio(s): See list: Land Revenue; Survey; Land Records; Land Reforms
- Preceded by: K. Rajan

Minister for Schedule Cast & Backward Communities Development and Tourism, Government of Kerala
- In office 18 May 2011 – 20 May 2016
- Preceded by: A. K. Balan (Schedule Casts & Backward Communities Development); Kodiyeri Balakrishnan; (Tourism )
- Succeeded by: A. K. Balan (Schedule Casts & Backward Communities Development); A. C. Moideen (Tourism )

Minister for SC/ST Development & Welfare of Backward Communities, Youth Affairs, Zoo, Archaeology, Archives Museum and Cultural Affairs, Government of Kerala
- In office 31 August 2004 – 12 May 2006
- Preceded by: M. A. Kuttappan (SC/ST Development & Welfare of Backward Communities, Youth Affairs); T. M. Jacob (Zoo, Archaeology, Archives and Museum); G. Karthikeyan (Cultural Affairs)
- Succeeded by: A. K. Balan (SC/ST Development & Welfare of Backward Communities); M. Vijayakumar (Youth Affairs); M. A. Baby (Cultural Affairs, Zoo, Archaeology, Archives and Museum)

Member of the Kerala Legislative Assembly
- Incumbent
- Assumed office 10 May 2001
- Preceded by: N. Kannan
- Constituency: Wandoor

Personal details
- Born: 15 March 1965 (age 61) Malappuram, Kerala
- Party: Indian National Congress

Akkarapurakkal Anil Kumar is an Indian politician and Indian national congress leader from Malappuram district, Kerala. He is currently serving as the Minister for Revenue, Government of Kerala. He is a former minister of Kerala and current M.L.A. of Wandoor assembly constituency since 2001.

== Early life ==
Anil Kumar was born on 15 March 1965 as the son of Devakiamma and A. P. Balan of the Akkarapurakkal house at Malappuram District.

He completed B. A. Political Science.

== Political career ==
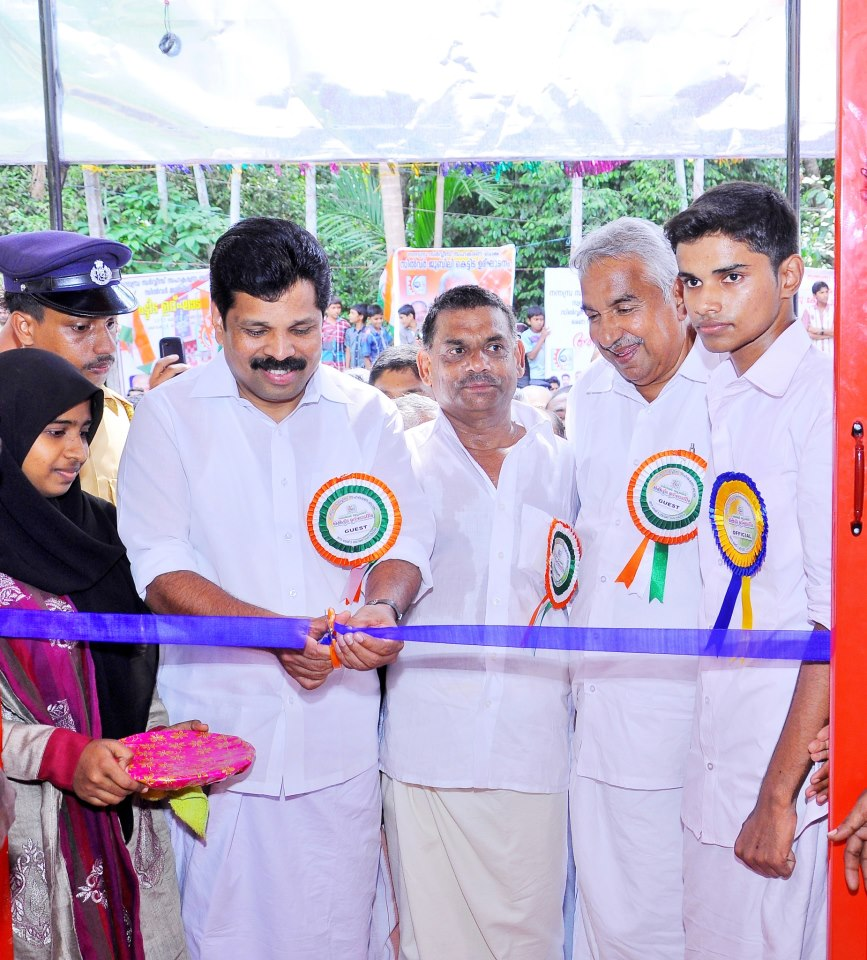
Kerala CM Oommen Chandy, Tourism Minister AP Anilkumar, AYC General Secretary Favad Pathoor in an inaugural function

A. P. Anil Kumar started his political career in the Kerala Students Union and was the State Secretary of the Indian Youth Congress. In 2001, he was elected by the Wandoor Constituency to the Kerala Legislative Assembly and later became Minister with portfolios of social, cultural, and youth affairs in the Oommen Chandy Ministry in 2004. He was re-elected to the Legislative Assembly in 2006 and 2011. He was a member of the executive committee of Kerala Agricultural University during 2002-04 and the Student welfare committee chairman. He has now completed 25 years as MLA in Wandoor town.

Political Positions

- 1979 KSU Unit President
- 1982 KSU Taluk President
- 1984 KSU District Secretary Malappuram
- 1986 Youth Congress Malappuram District Vice President, State General Secretary
- 2001, 2006, 2011, 2016 Wandoor MLA
- 2004-2006 Minister for the Welfare of Scheduled Communities and Youth Cultural affairs
- 2011-2016 Minister for Backward Communities and Tourism
- 2026 to present; minister for Land revenue and survey under V D Satheesan ministry.
