= Pulikkottil Hyder =

Indian poet

Pulath Pulikkottil Hyder (born in 1879 at Wandoor) was a popular poet who composed short songs in Arabi-Malayalam on topics of common interest, often attacking social evils. His simple lyrics on ordinary life of the Mappilas defied the traditional patterns of Mappilappattu thus giving him the name "The Kunchan Nambiar of Mappilappattu". In Vellappokka Maala, he describes a heavy flood that affected all throughout the Malabar, Mysore and Travancore. The sufferings of common men in the flood are depicted beautifully using only ordinary Malayalam vocabulary. The Pulikkotil Hyder Smaraka Puraskaram, instituted by the Mahakavi Moyinkutty Vaidyar Smaraka Committee and given to personalities who have contributed to the art of Mappilappattu is named after him. The foundation for a memorial for the poet was laid in his hometown Wandoor by former Chief Minister of Kerala C.H. Mohammed Koya in April 1979, but the work has remained incomplete ever since. In 1979, the Mappila Kala Sahithya Vedi published a compilation of his works titled "Pulikkottil Krithikal".
