= Thiruvali =

- panchayath and village
- Country: India
- State: Kerala
- District: Malappuram

Population (2011)
  - Total: 27,734

Languages
  - Official: Malayalam, English
- Time zone: UTC+5:30 (IST)
- PIN: 676123
- Vehicle registration: KL-
- Nearest city: Malappuram, Calicut

Thiruvali is a village in Malappuram district in the state of Kerala, India.

== Location ==
Thiruvali is located between Edavanna and Wandoor in Malappuram District, and Near Pathiriyal, Kerala.

== Demographics ==
At the 2011 India census, Thiruvali had a population of 27,734 with 13,278 males and 14,456 females.
