= Ambalakkadavu =

Ambalakkadavu is a village in Kalikavu. It is located in the north of Kerala state.

== Culture ==
Ambalakkadavu village is a predominantly Muslim populated area. Hindus exist in comparatively smaller numbers. So the culture of the locality is based upon Muslim traditions. Duffmuttu, kolkali and aravana muttu are common folk arts of this locality. There are many libraries attached to mosques giving a rich source of Islamic studies. Most of the books are written in Arabi-Malayalam which is a version of the Malayalam language written in Arabic script. People gather in mosques for the evening prayer and continue to sit there after the prayers discussing social and cultural issues. Business and family issues are also sorted out during these evening meetings. The Hindu minority of this area keeps their rich traditions by celebrating various festivals in their temples. Hindu rituals are done here with a regular devotion like other parts of Kerala.

== Transportation ==
Ambalakadavu village connects to other parts of India through Nilambur town. State Highway 39 (Nilambur–Perumbilavu Highway) passes through Kalikavu town is just 2 km away from Ambalakkadavu. State Highway 28 starts from Nilambur and connects to Ooty, Mysore and Bangalore through Highways 12, 29 and 181. National Highway 66 (NH 66) passes through Ramanattukara and the northern stretch connects to Goa and Mumbai. The southern stretch connects to Cochin and Trivandrum. State. The nearest airport is at Kozhikode. The nearest railway station is Vaniyambalam and major railway station is Shoranur Junction.
