= Pallissery =

Village in Kerala, India

Pallissery is a village beside Madumala in Kalikavu Panchayat, Nilambur taluk in Malappuram district in the state of Kerala, India.

== Transportation ==
Pallissery village connects to other parts of India through Nilambur town. State Highway No.28 starts from Nilambur and connects to Ooty, Mysore and Bangalore through Highways.12,29 and 181. National highway No.66 passes through Ramanattukara and the northern stretch connects to Goa and Mumbai. The southern stretch connects to Cochin and Trivandrum. State. The nearest airport is at Kozhikode. The nearest major railway station is at Feroke.

Kalikavu PO, 676 525 Malappuram
