= Kalikavu =

- town
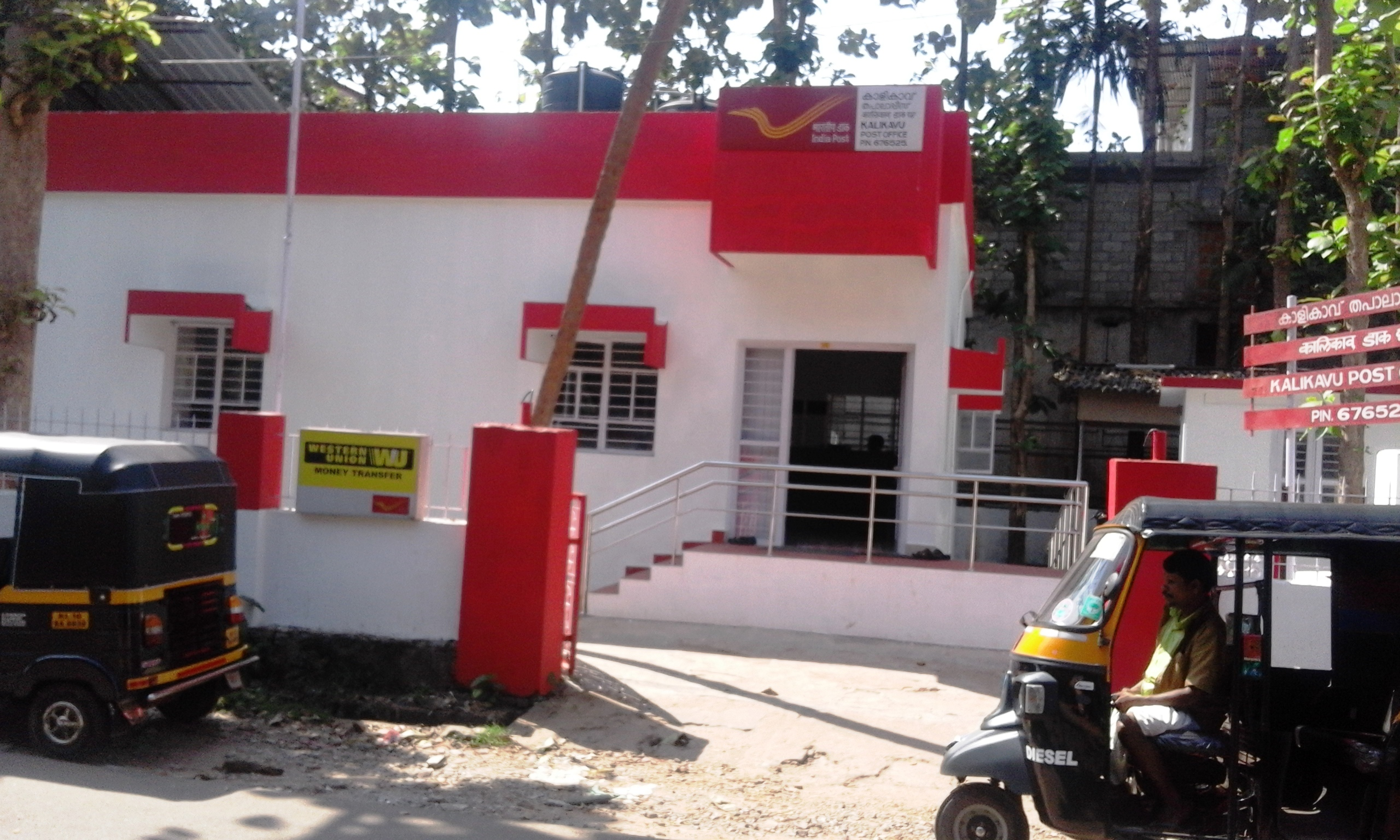
- Kalikavu Post Office
- Interactive map of Kalikavu
- Coordinates: 11.1719603°N 76.3210559°E
- Country: India
- State: Kerala
- District: Malappuram

Population
  - Total: 26,862

Languages
  - Official: Malayalam, English
- Time zone: UTC+5:30 (IST)
- PIN: 676525
- Telephone code: 04931
- Vehicle registration: KL-71

Kalikavu is a town in the Nilambur taluk of Malappuram district in Kerala state, South India. Kalikavu, like the neighbouring town of Nilambur, is also known for its rubber plantations. Coconut, pepper, areca nut, and teak are also cultivated here.

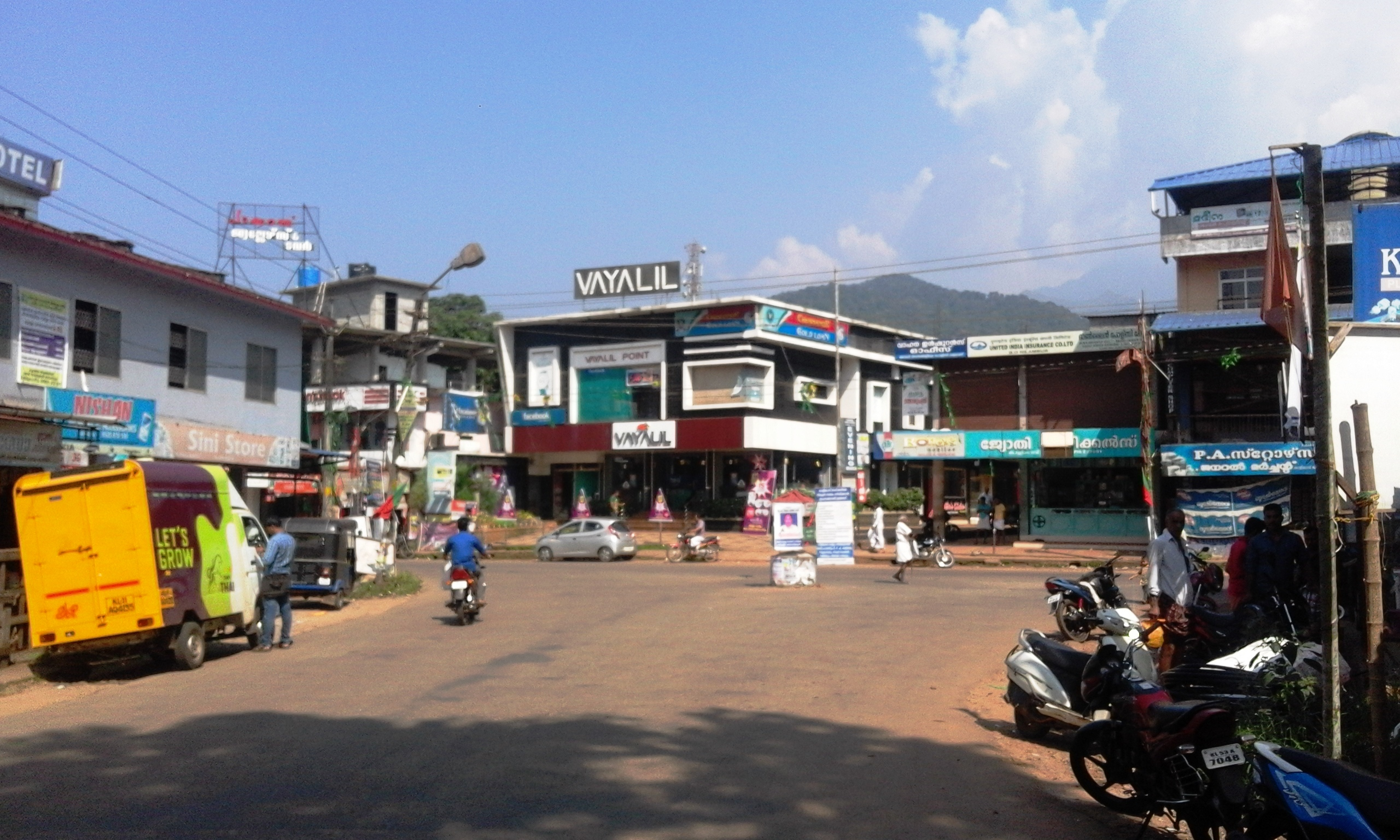
Kalikavu Town

The nearest airport is Calicut International Airport (54 km) and the nearest railway station is Vaniyambalam Railway Station. Regular bus services operate between Kalikavu and cities such as Manjeri, Perinthalmanna, Thrissur and Kozhikode., The village is renowned for its pivotal role in numerous freedom struggles during India's fight for independence, especially during Malabar Revolution in 1921.The kalikavu Police Station is one of the oldest police stations in kerala which is established by the british in 1898 .The village is also known for its football craze, numerous local football teams are competing in special football tournaments known as the 'Sevens' football. There are a lot of beautiful obscure tourist locations nearby. Kalikavu river is the soul of the village where a number of water streams are originating and they are the cornerstone of the cultivation in all the small villages nearby

== Suburbs and Villages ==
- Thandukode, Venthodanpadi, cherooth Puttamanna, Kurupoyil, and Amappoyil
- Vellayoor, Anchachavadi, Pallissery, Pariyangadu and Ambalakkadavu
- ( Ambalakkadvu, Karutheni, Poongode and Adakkakundu
- Chazhiyodu, Maruthungal, Moochikkal and
- Chengodu Bridge, Arimanal, Kanaranpadi and Enadi.

== Culture ==
Kalikavu village is combined of Hindus, Muslims and Christian. Each religion respect another's traditions . This village is truly a great fans of football.

== Transportation ==
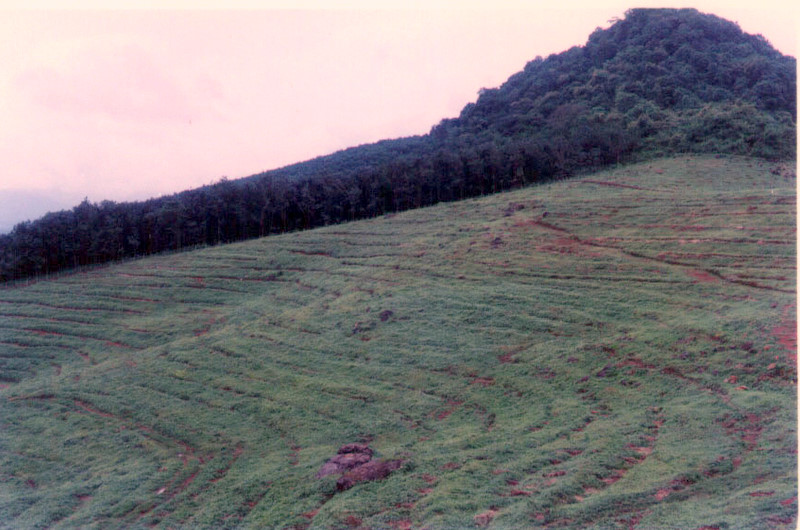
Terrace farming at Kalikavu (photographed in 2007)

Kalikavu village connects to other parts of India through Nilambur town. State Highway No.28 starts from Nilambur and connects to Ooty, Mysore and Bangalore through Highways.12,29 and 181. National highway No.66 passes through Ramanattukara and the northern stretch connects to Goa and Mumbai. The southern stretch connects to Cochin and Trivandrum. State. The nearest airport is at Kozhikode. The nearest major railway station is at Vaniyambalam.

FOR BUS TIME:

https://sites.google.com/site/hfponlinemedia/kalikavu-bus-time
