= Pathiriyal =

- Panchayath and village
- Location in Kerala, India Pathiriyal (India)
- Coordinates: 11.17°N 76.13°E
- Country: India
- State: Kerala
- District: Malappuram

Population (2001)
  - Panchayath: 24,275

Languages
  - Official: Malayalam, English
- Time zone: UTC+5:30 (IST)
- PIN: 676123
- Vehicle registration: KL 71
- Nearest city: Malappuram, Calicut

Pathiriyal is a village located in the Malappuram district of Kerala, India. It reported a population of 24,725 in the 2001 census. Pathiriyal is famous for coconuts and beautiful paddy fields.The main tourist attraction in Pathiriyal is Valiyakulam Pathiriyal, it is a pond situated in Pathiriyal where hundreds of people comes daily.
