= Vaniyambalam =

- Town
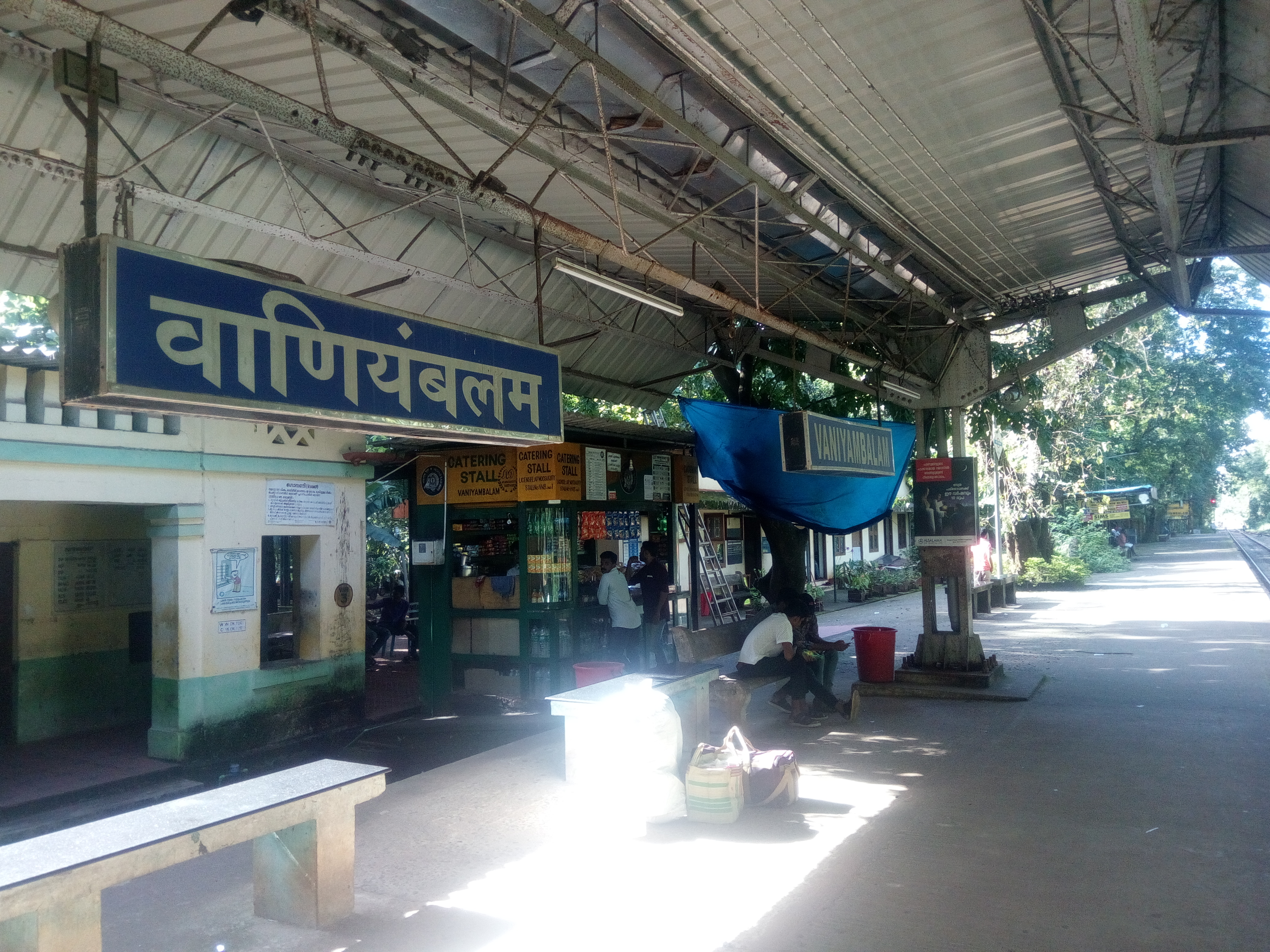
- Vaniyambalam railway station serves the town of Wandoor

- Location in Kerala, India Vaniyambalam (India)
- Coordinates: 11°11′0″N 76°15′30″E
- Country: India
- State: Kerala
- District: Malappuram

Government
  - MLA: A. P. Anil Kumar
  - MP: Rahul Gandhi - Wayanad Lok Sabha Constituency

Languages
  - Official: Malayalam, English
- Time zone: UTC+5:30 (IST)
- PIN: 679339
- Telephone code: 914931
- Vehicle registration: KL 71

Vaniyambalam (വാണിയമ്പലം) lies in Nilambur taluk in the Malappuram district, Kerala and is 40 km north-east of Malappuram. Surrounding towns include Pandikkad and Tuvvur (to the south), Kalikavu (in the east), and Wandoor and Nilambur (to the north).

Vaniyambalam got its name as it means goddess Vani's (Saraswati) ambalam (temple) located at the top of Vaniyambalam Rock hill. It is famous for the fish market, as in olden times, people used to catch trains from Nilambur, Tuvvur and Melatur, just to buy fish.

== Teak plantations ==
Vaniyambalam is famous for the sales of Nilambur teak wood. The wide railway flat was using for stacking of timber, which was transported by railway across India.

== Temples ==
A famous temple, which is commonly visited by tourists and pilgrims, is situated on the top of a rocky hill which spreads across 40 acres. The temple was vandalised in January 2017.

== Transportation ==
Vaniyambalam village connects to other parts of India through Nilambur town. State Highway 28 starts from Nilambur and connects to Ooty, Mysore and Bangalore through Highways 12, 29 and 181. National highway 66 passes through Ramanattukara; the northern section connects to Goa and Mumbai; the southern stretch connects to Cochin and Trivandrum. The nearest airport is located at Karipur, and another close airport is Coimbatore Airport. The nearest major railway station is at Feroke. Vaniyambalam railway station is part of the Southern Railway and is on Shoranur-Nilambur Railway Line but is nearer Wandoor. This railway station is located 11 km south from Nilambur Road Railway Station. Nilambur Road Railway Station is the main station to the north of Vaniyambalam.

== Notable people ==
1. K. B. Sreedevi - Novelist
2. Vaniyambalam Abdurahman Musliyar - Muslim scholar
3. Porur Unnikrishnan - Thayambaka Artist
