= Wandoor, Kerala =

Town in Kerala, India

Wandoor
- Town
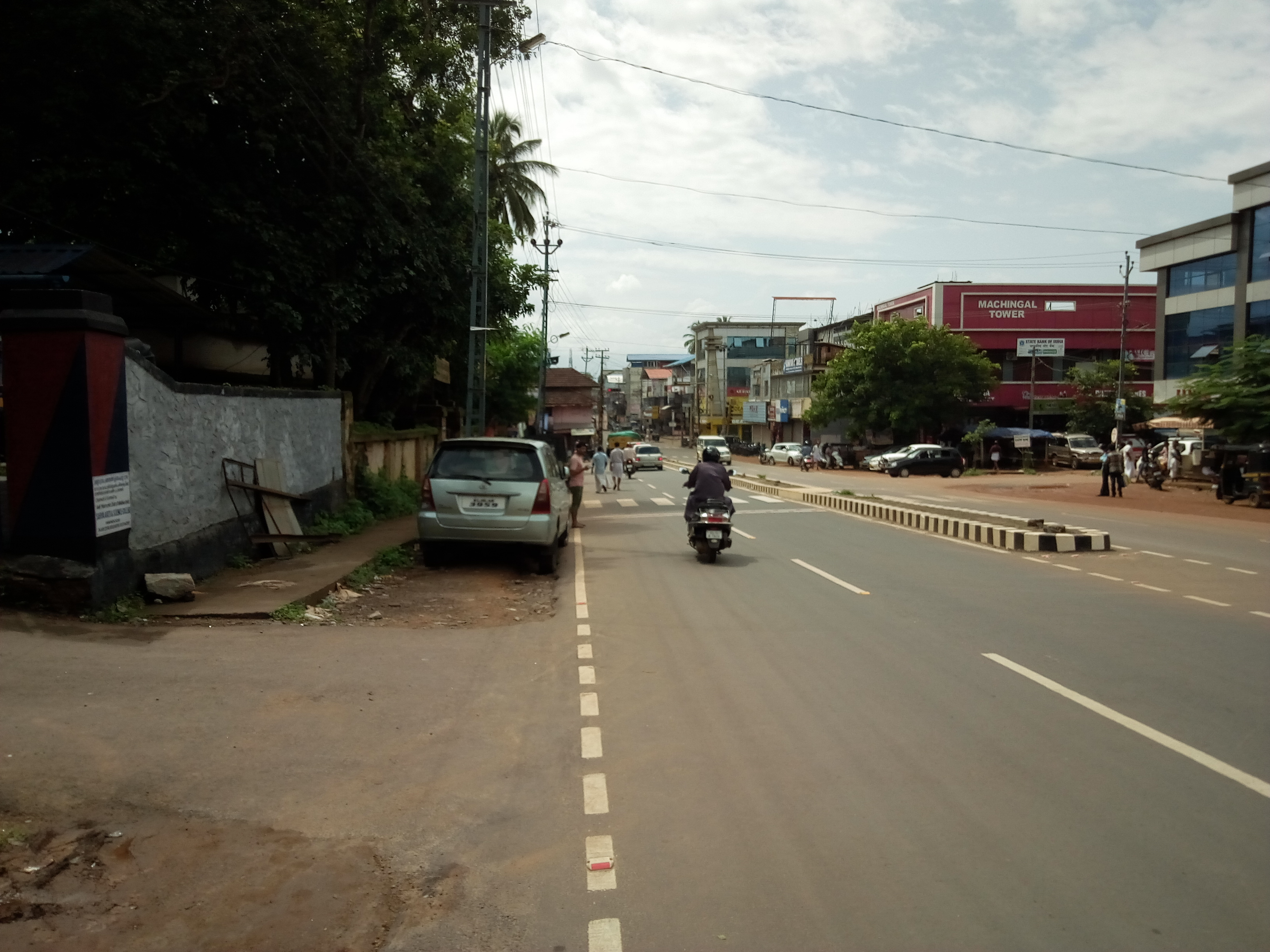
- Wandoor Town in 2017

- Location within Kerala Location within India
- Coordinates: 11°11′44″N 76°14′09″E
- Country: India
- State: Kerala
- District: Malappuram
- Taluk: Nilambur

Government
  - Type: Gram Panchayat

Area
  - Total: 47.32 km^{2} (18.27 sq mi)
- Elevation: 48 m (157 ft)

Population (2011)
  - Total: 50,973
  - Density: 1,077/km^{2} (2,790/sq mi)

Languages
  - Official: Malayalam
  - Other: English
- Time zone: UTC+5:30 (IST)
- PIN: 679328
- STD code: 04931
- Vehicle registration: KL-71

Wandoor is a town in Nilambur Taluk, Malappuram District, Kerala, India. It is located on the southeast of the Chaliyar River, about 24 kilometres northeast of the district seat Malappuram and 8 km south of the taluk seat Nilambur. In the year 2011, the town has a population of 50,973.

== Geography ==
Wandoor is located in the central area of Malappuram District. The State Highway 73 valanchery-nilambur state highway passes through the town. Its average elevation is 48 metres above the sea level.

== Climate ==
Wandoor has Tropical Monsoon Climate (Am) under the Köppen Climate Classification. It sees the most rainfall in June, with 654 mm of average precipitation; and the least in January, with 28 mm of average precipitation.

Climate data for Wandoor
Month	Jan	Feb	Mar	Apr	May	Jun	Jul	Aug	Sep	Oct	Nov	Dec	Year
Mean daily maximum °C (°F)	32.1 (89.8)	33.5 (92.3)	33.6 (92.5)	31.4 (88.5)	30 (86)	27.8 (82.0)	27.3 (81.1)	27.5 (81.5)	28.4 (83.1)	28.7 (83.7)	29.3 (84.7)	30.3 (86.5)	30.0 (86.0)
Daily mean °C (°F)	25.9 (78.6)	27.1 (80.8)	27.9 (82.2)	27.3 (81.1)	26.5 (79.7)	24.8 (76.6)	24.4 (75.9)	24.5 (76.1)	24.9 (76.8)	25.1 (77.2)	25.2 (77.4)	25 (77)	25.7 (78.3)
Mean daily minimum °C (°F)	19.1 (66.4)	20.6 (69.1)	22.5 (72.5)	23.5 (74.3)	23.5 (74.3)	22.8 (73.0)	22.3 (72.1)	22.3 (72.1)	22.2 (72.0)	21.9 (71.4)	20.9 (69.6)	19.1 (66.4)	21.7 (71.1)
Average rainfall mm (inches)	28 (1.1)	29 (1.1)	95 (3.7)	232 (9.1)	371 (14.6)	654 (25.7)	599 (23.6)	445 (17.5)	294 (11.6)	425 (16.7)	269 (10.6)	77 (3.0)	3,518 (138.3)
Source: Climate-Data.org

== Demographics ==
According to the 2011 Census of India, Wandoor has 10,663 households. Among the 50,973 inhabitants, 24,516 are male and 26,457 are female. The total literacy rate is 80.59%, with 20,176 of the male population and 20,901 of the female population being literate. The census location code of the town is 627481.

== Landmark ==
- Wandoor Siva Temple

== Notable people ==
- Pulikkottil Hyder, renowned Mappila Paattu poet.
- T. K. Hamza, former minister of Kerala and former Member of Parliament.
