= Veliyankode =

Veliyankode Veliancode
- village
- Location in Kerala, India Veliyankode (India)
- Coordinates: 10.729600°N 75.947140°E
- Country: India
- State: Kerala
- District: Malappuram

Population (2011)
  - Total: 32,554

Languages
  - Official: Malayalam, English
- Time zone: UTC+5:30 (IST)
- PIN: 679579
- Vehicle registration: KL-
- Lok Sabha constituency: Ponnani const.
- Vidhan Sabha constituency: Ponnani assembly const

Veliyankode is a beautiful sandy coastal village and Gram Panchayat in Ponnani taluk, Malappuram district in the state of Kerala, India. It is located in the middle of the Malabar Coast, between Ponnani and Perumbadappu.

== Demographics ==
As of 2011 India census, Veliyankode had a population of 32554 with 15054 males and 17500 females.

== Geography ==
Veliyankode Grama Panchayat is bounded by Biyyam Kayal backwater and Puthuponnani estuary (Ponnani Municipality) to north, Maranchery Grama Panchayat to east, Perumbadappu Grama Panchayat to south and Arabian Sea to west. Veliyankode Kayal is a backwater at Veliyankode.

== Wards of Veliyankode ==
Veliyankode Grama Panchayat

Veliyankode Grama Panchayat is composed of the following 18 wards:

Ward no.	Name	Ward no.	Name
1	Ummar Ghasi	2	Thavalakulam
3	Veliyancode East	4	Pazhanji
5	Moolamukku	6	Perumudissery
7	Eramangalam	8	Thazhathelpadi
9	Cherikallu	10	Nakkola
11	Eramangalam West	12	Kothamukku
13	Gramam	14	Ayyottichira
15	Thannithura	16	Veliyankode Town
17	Pathumuri	18	Mattummal

== Transportation ==
Veliyankode village connects to other parts of India through Kuttippuram town. National highway No.66 passes through Edappal and the northern stretch connects to Goa and Mumbai. The southern stretch connects to Cochin and Trivandrum. The nearest airport is at Kozhikode. The nearest major railway station is at Kuttippuram and Tirur.

== Notable people ==
- Veliyankode Umar Khasi (1763-1856) - freedom fighter and poet.
- Sayyid Sanaullah Makti Tangal (1847-1912) - Educationalist and social reformer.
- K. C. S. Paniker - An artist.

== See also ==
- Ponnani
- Puthuponnani
- Edappal
- Maranchery
- Perumbadappu
