= Perumpadappu, Malappuram =

Perumbadappu
- Village
- Location in Kerala, India Perumbadappu (India)
- Coordinates: 10.7019165°0′0″N 75.9861404°0′0″E
- Country: India
- State: Kerala
- District: Malappuram

Languages
  - Official: Malayalam, English
- PIN: 679580

Perumbadappu is a village located in Ponnani taluk, Malappuram district, Kerala state, India. It is situated 15 kilometers south of Ponnani, bordering Thrissur district. Perumbadappu is also headquarters of one of the 15 Block Panchayats in the district and a police station. Perumbadappu is located south of Veliyankode, in the middle of Malabar Coast.

Chitrakoodam in Vanneri, Perumbadappu, was the original homeland of the Cochin rulers. When the king of Calicut annexed the region, the rulers of Permbadappu fled to Cranganore (Kodungallur). Later, they again changed their base to Cochin in the early 15th century, thus naming their state as Perumpadappu Swaroopam.

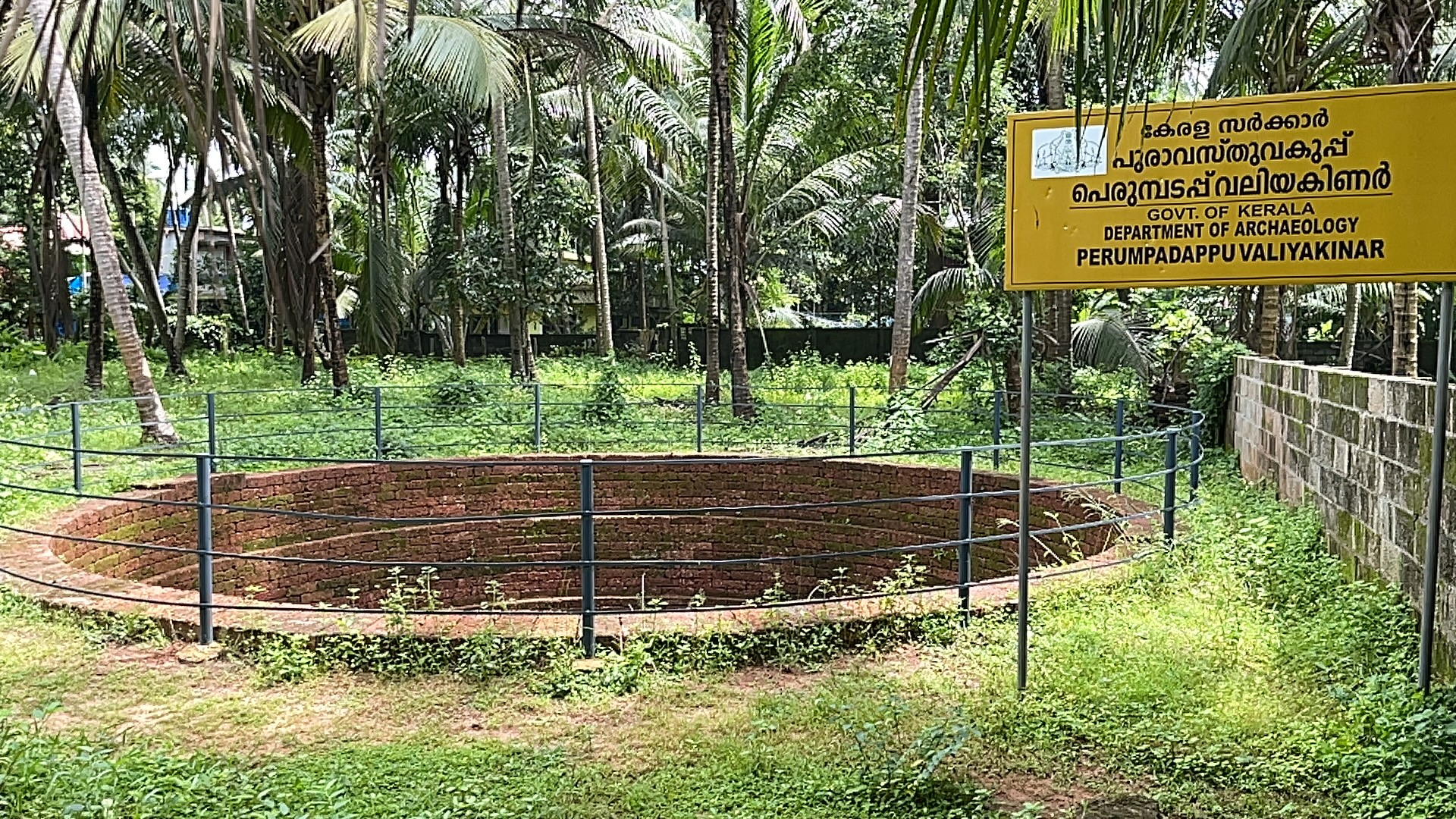
The eighth century Valiyakinar near Vanneri in Malapuram was identified near the area where once the principal manor of the Perumbadappu Swarupam was situated

There is a famous mosque, Perumbadappu Puthanpalli, where Andu Nercha attracts thousands of pilgrims. The Nercha culminates in food distribution (neichor (ghee rice)) to all the people.

A Hospital also there named KMM Hospital located at Puthanpalli which is run and maintained by Perumpadappa, Puthanpalli Jaram Committee.

History: Perumbadappu Swaroopam, also known as the Perumpadappu Dynasty, was a prominent royal lineage in Kerala, India. The dynasty originally ruled from Perumbadappu, a region near Ponnani in the present-day Malappuram district. The rulers of Perumbadappu Swaroopam later established the Kingdom of Cochin (Kochi Rajyam) after migrating southwards due to invasions by the Zamorins (Samoothiris) of Calicut.

The term Swaroopam in Kerala history refers to a royal house or ruling lineage. The Perumbadappu Swaroopam initially governed from central Kerala but shifted its capital to Kochi following territorial conflicts. This migration marked the beginning of the Cochin Royal Family, which played a significant role in the political and cultural history of Kerala.

The rulers of Perumbadappu Swaroopam, including notable kings such as Veera Raghava Chakravartin, Veera Kerala Varma and Unni Kerala Varma, are known for their alliances with the Syrian Christian Merchant Prince Iravikorttan during 13th Century by issuing the Viraraghava copper plate and with the Portuguese during the early 16th century. After Vasco da Gama’s arrival in 1498, the dynasty allied with the Portuguese to counter the power of the Zamorin of Calicut, which led to Cochin becoming one of the earliest centers of European influence in India.

The original Perumbadappu remains a historical village near Ponnani in Malappuram district. The descendants of the Perumbadappu Swaroopam continued as the Cochin Royal Family, maintaining titular status even after the integration of the princely states into the Indian Union.

== Wards of Perumbadappu ==
Perumbadappu Grama Panchayat

Perumbadappu Grama Panchayat is composed of the following 18 wards:

Ward no.	Name	Ward no.	Name
1	Vanneri	2	Cherayi
3	Kodathoor South	4	Ayiroor West
5	Palapetty East	6	Poovangara
7	Puthiyiruthi West	8	Puthiyiruthi East
9	Ayiroor East	10	Kodathoor North
11	Puthenpalli	12	Kozhapully
13	Cheruvallur West	14	Cheruvallur East
15	Thavalakunnu	16	Perumbadappu
17	Palapetty West	18	Thattuparambu

== Villages in Ponnani Taluk ==
- Alamcode
- Maranchery
- Nannammukku
- Veliancode
- Perumpadappu

== Transportation ==
Perumpadappu village connects to other parts of India through Kuttippuram town. National highway No.66 passes through Edappal and the northern stretch connects to Goa and Mumbai. The southern stretch connects to Cochin and Trivandrum. National Highway No.966 connects to Palakkad and Coimbatore. The nearest airport is at Kozhikode. The nearest major railway station is at Kuttippuram.guruvayur temple is only 18 km away from perumpadappu.

== See also ==
- Ponnani
- Veliyankode
- Edappal
- Changaramkulam
- Punnayurkulam
- Ponnani taluk
