= Kakkidippuram =

Coordinates: 10.7624°N 76.0448°E

Kakkidippuram is a small village in Kerala, composed of WARD 2 & 3 of Alamcode panchayath of Malappuram District.

== Education ==
This small village has the following educational organizations:

- Kumara Vilasam Upper Primary School
- Al Falah LP School.
- Al Falah English Medium School
- Smskruthi English School
- Grid tie solar changaramkulam

== Culture ==
This village is a predominantly Muslim populated area. Hindus exist in comparatively smaller numbers. So the culture of the locality is based upon Muslim traditions. Duff Muttu, Kolkali and Aravanamuttu are common folk arts of this locality. There are many libraries attached to mosques giving a rich source of Islamic studies. Most of the books are written in Arabi-Malayalam which is a version of the Malayalam language written in Arabic script. People gather in mosques for the evening prayer and continue to sit there after the prayers discussing social and cultural issues. Business and family issues are also sorted out during these evening meetings. The Hindu minority of this area keeps their rich traditions by celebrating various festivals in their temples. Hindu rituals are done here with a regular devotion like other parts of Kerala.

== Transport ==
This village connects to other parts of India through Kuttippuram town. National highway No.66 passes through Edappal and the northern stretch connects to Goa and Mumbai. The southern stretch connects to Cochin and Trivandrum. National Highway No.966 connects to Palakkad and Coimbatore. The nearest airport is at Kozhikode. The nearest major railway station is at Kuttippuram.
