= Ponnani =

Municipality in Kerala, India

- Municipality
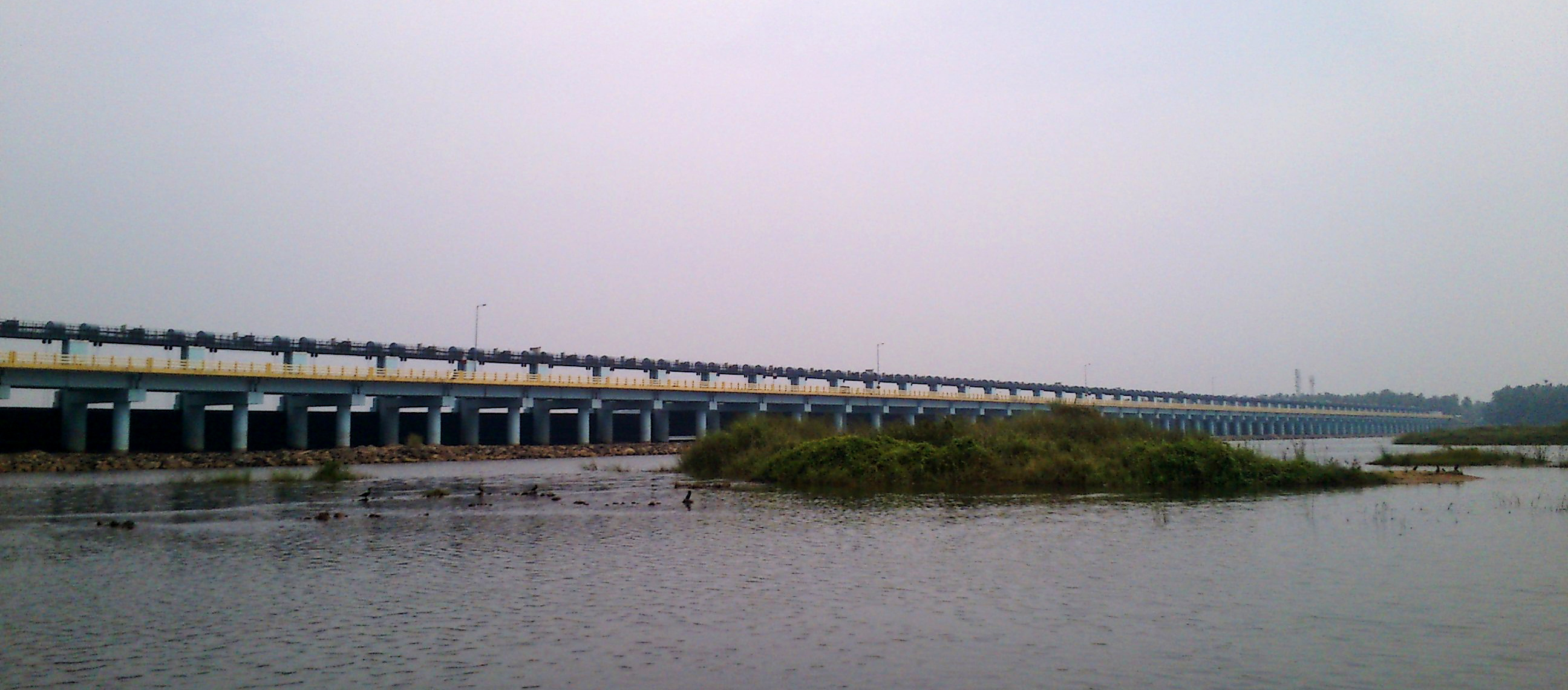
- Chamravattom Regulator-cum-Bridge connects Ponnani with Tirur. Bharathappuzha river (Ponnani River) and Tirur River join with each other and empties together into Arabian Sea at Purathur (Southernmost tip of Tirur Taluk), which lies opposite of Ponnani Port.
- Nicknames: The City of Gold coins, The Little Mecca of Malabar
- Location in Kerala, India Ponnani (India) Ponnani (Asia) Ponnani (Earth)
- Coordinates: 10.77°N 75.9°E
- Country: India
- State: Kerala
- District: Malappuram

Government
  - Body: Ponnani Municipality
  - Municipal Chairperson: C.V. Sudha
  - Vice Chairperson: C.P. Sakeer

Area
  - Total: 24.82 km^{2} (9.58 sq mi)

Population (2011)
  - Total: 90,491
  - Density: 3,646/km^{2} (9,443/sq mi)
- Time zone: UTC+5:30 (IST)
- Postal Index Number: 679 577
- Telephone code: 0494
- Vehicle registration: KL-54
- Website: ponnanimunicipality.lsgkerala.gov.in

Ponnani (Malayalam: [ponːaːni]) is a municipality in Ponnani Taluk, Malappuram District, in the state of Kerala, India. It serves as the administrative center of the Taluk and Block Panchayat of the same name. It is situated at the estuary of Bharatappuzha (River Ponnani), on its southern bank, and is bounded by the Arabian Sea on the west and a series of brackish lagoons in the south.

It is the seventh-most populated municipality in the state, the second-most populated municipality in the district, and the most densely populated municipality in Malappuram district, having about 3,646 residents per square kilometre as of the year 2011. As of the 2011 Census, the municipality forms a part of Malappuram metropolitan area. National Highway 66, from to Panvel to Kanyakumari, passes through Ponnani Municipality. The Palakkad-Ponnani State Highway which connects National Highway 66 with National Highway 544 is another important road. The River Tirur‍‍‍‍‍‍‍‍ joins River Ponnani at its mouth at Patinjarekkara Beach from the north bank, opposite to Ponnani. The Colonial-era Cannoly Canal ("the Ponnani Canal") bisects Ponnani town. Ponnani is located 68 km south to Kozhikode city, 48 km southwest to Malappuram city, 91 km northwest to Palakkad city, and 50 km northwest to Thrissur city. Ponnani is located right in the middle of the Kerala coast.

In the Middle Ages, under the ambitious Hindu chiefs of Kozhikode (the Samutiris/Zamorins), Ponnani developed as one of the most important centers of Muslim trade - both overseas and domestic - on the Arabian Sea. The port also served as the military headquarters of the Kozhikode rulers. With the arrival of the Portuguese explorers in the late - 15th century, the city witnessed several battles between the Admirals of Kozhikode and the Portuguese for the monopoly in the Spice Trade. Whenever a formal war was broke out between the Portuguese and the Kozhikode rulers, the Portuguese attacked and plundered, as the opportunity offered, the port of Ponnani. The relentless battles lead to the eventual decline of the settlement, with the exodus of Middle Eastern merchants, and the rulers who protected it. Presently, Ponnani is one of the major fishing centers in Kerala.

The original headquarters of the Perumbadappu Swaroopam, who later became the Kingdom of Cochin, was at Chithrakoodam in Vanneri, Perumpadappu, which is located 10 km south to Puthuponnani, in Ponnani taluk. When Perumpadappu came under the kingdom of the Zamorin of Calicut, the rulers of Perumpadappu fled to Kodungallur, and later they moved to Kochi, where they established the Kingdom of Cochin.

The city of Ponnani also provided ideological support for the battles against the Estado da Índia. It was the home of the revered Makhdum family. Prominent members of this Yemeni family of Islamic theologians included Zain-ud-Din Makhdum I (1467 - 1521) and his grandson Zain-ud-Din Makhdum II (1530 - 1581). Makhdum II is known for his formidable historical chronicle Tuhfat al-Mujahidin ("Glory to the Victory of Mujahidun", c. 1583), first printed and published in Lisbon. A copy of this edition has been preserved in the library of Al-Azhar University, Cairo.

The Ponnani Jum'ah Masjid, also known as Valiya Jum'ah Palli/Makhdum Mosque, was built in the 16th century AD. Ponnani, once known as the "Little Mecca of Malabar" and the "Jami'at al-Azhar of Malabar", was a prominent center of Islamic learning. It is known that students from as far as Sumatra, Java and Sri Lanka traveled to Ponnani for their spiritual education. The town was described in many sources as "the Land of 23½ Mosques". It currently has around 50 mosques, spread around the town.

During the months of February and March, large number of migratory birds flock at Ponnani (both Ponnani and Patinjarekkara Beaches). Arabi Malayalam script, a script used to write Malayalam, was originated at Ponnani. The script was also known as "the Ponnani Script". Bharathappuzha, also known as the Ponnani River, has contributed much to the Malayalam literature.

== Names ==
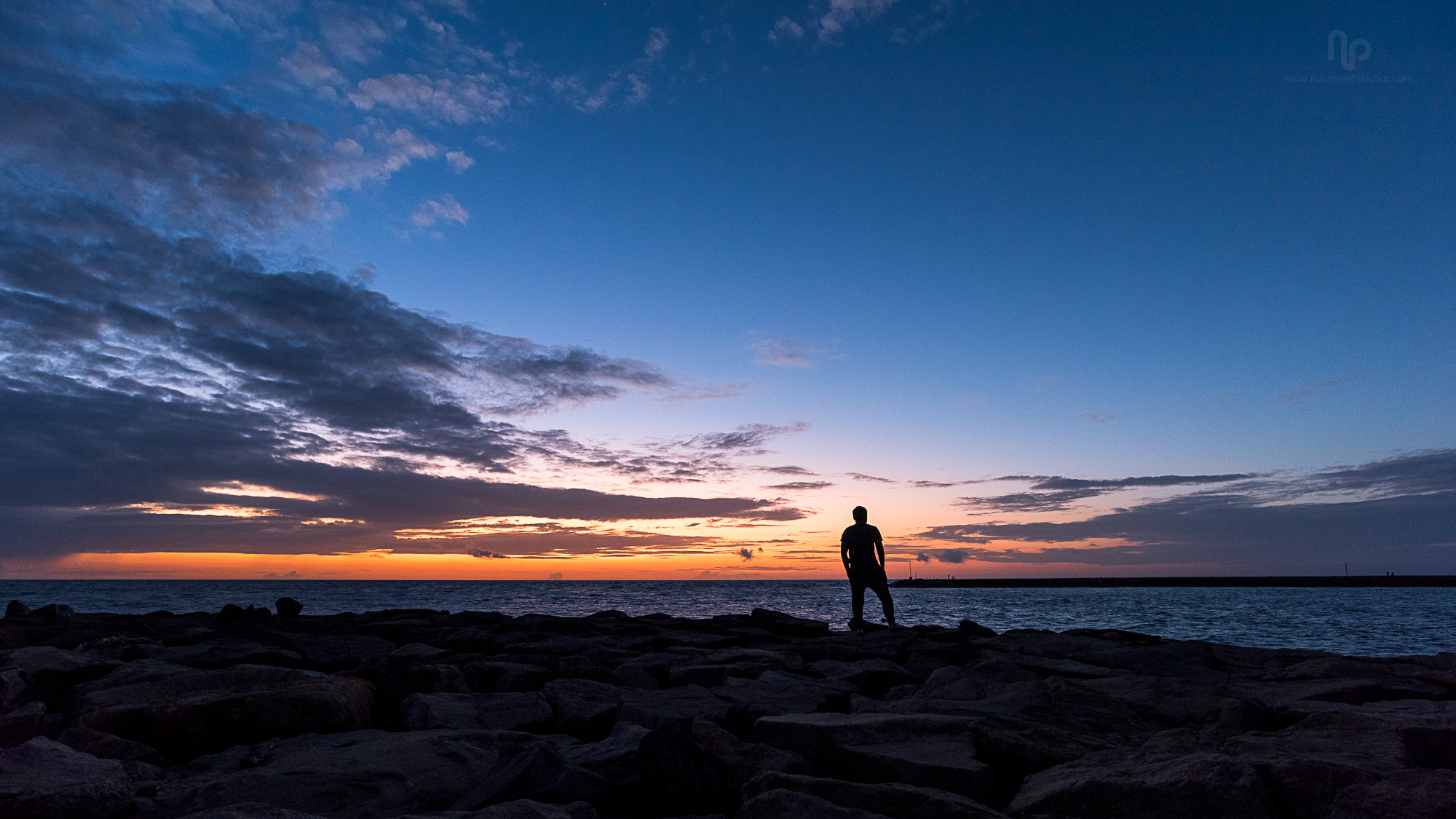
A view of Arabian Sea at Ponnani

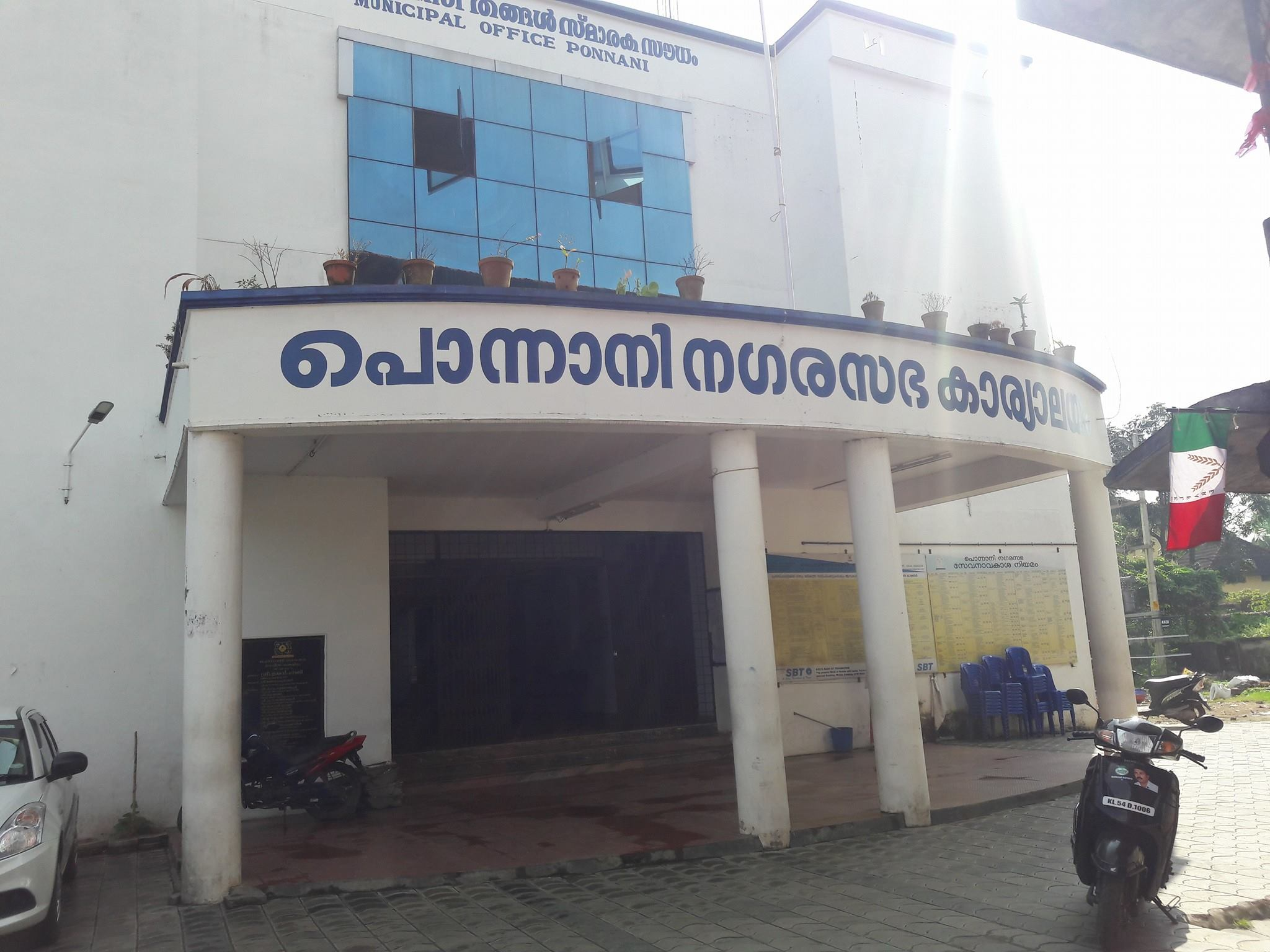
Ponnani municipal office

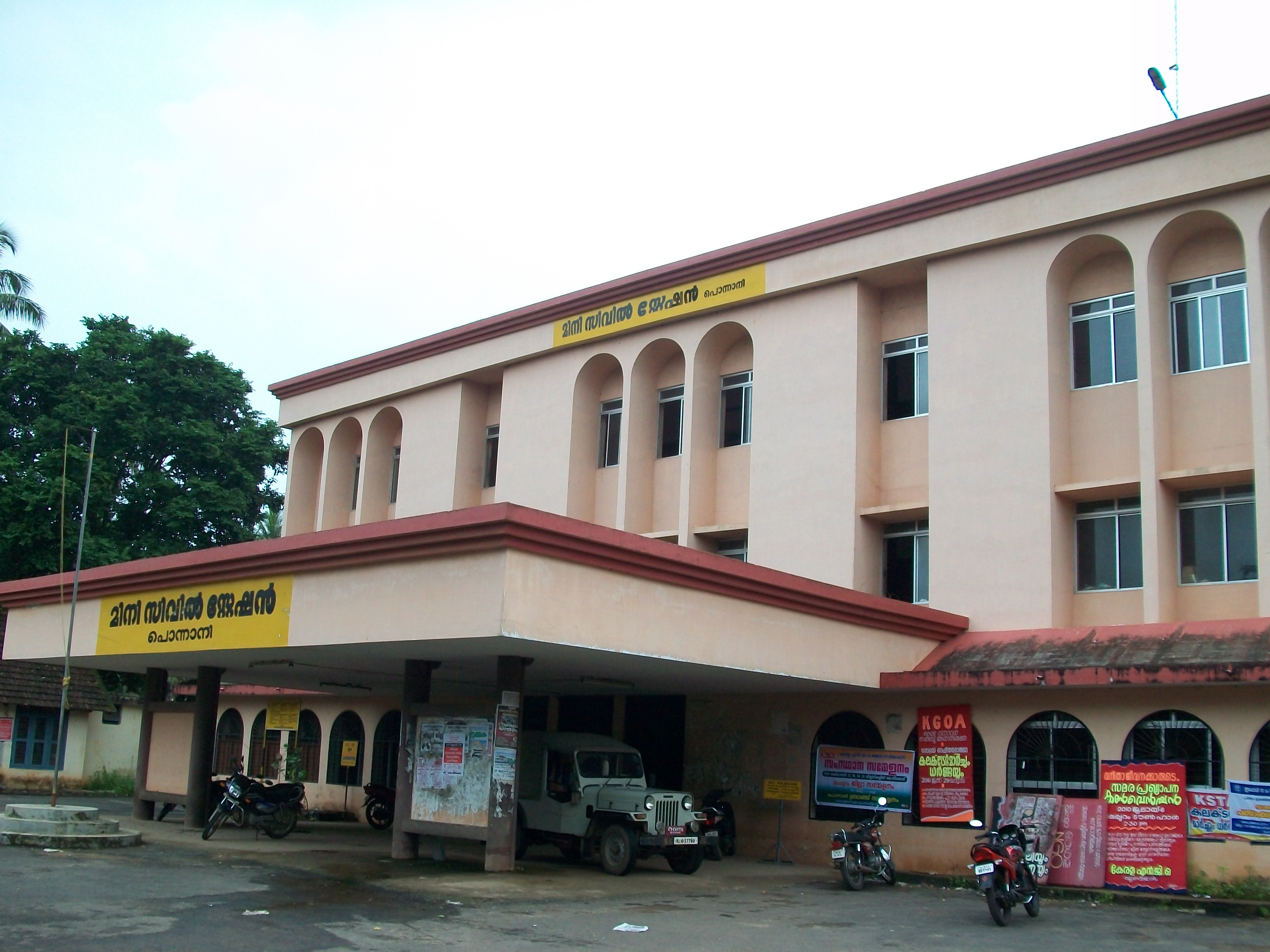
Ponnani mini civil station in 2010

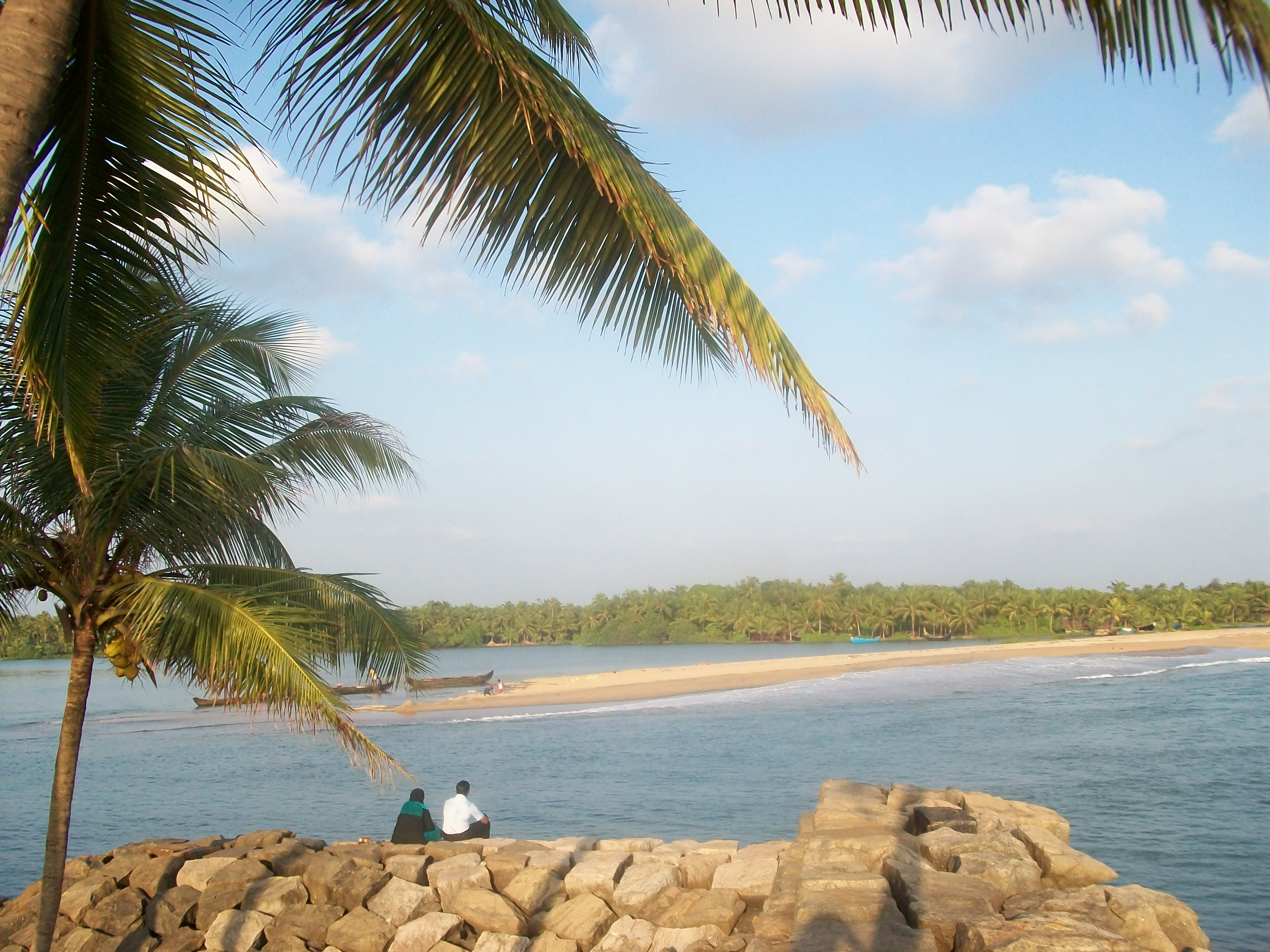
Puthuponnani Munambam Beach

Ponnani is described by different authors, all the way from Europe to Arabia to China, in different names. Some of the names are given below.

- Ponani/Paniyani: British/East India Company
- Ponam: the Chinese Sailors
- Funan: the Arab merchants
- Pananee/Pananie/Pananx: the Portuguese and Spanish Writers and Sailors
- Panane/Panany: the Dutch East India Company
- Pagnany/Pagniany: the French Sailors

== Etymology ==
It is believed the word Ponnani was derived from pon nanayam (meaning gold currency in Tamil and Malayalam) after the circulation of Arab gold coins introduced here by the Arabs and the Persians. The name of the place traces back to the maritime trade tradition of the port city. Bharathappuzha River (River Ponnani), which is also the second-longest river in Kerala flows into Arabian Sea at Ponnani port. The Palakkad Gap on the bank of River Bharathappuzha was the principal trade route between Malabar Coast and Coromandel Coast in ancient times. Anyway the name Ponnani is connected with the maritime trade that occurred here for centuries.

== History ==
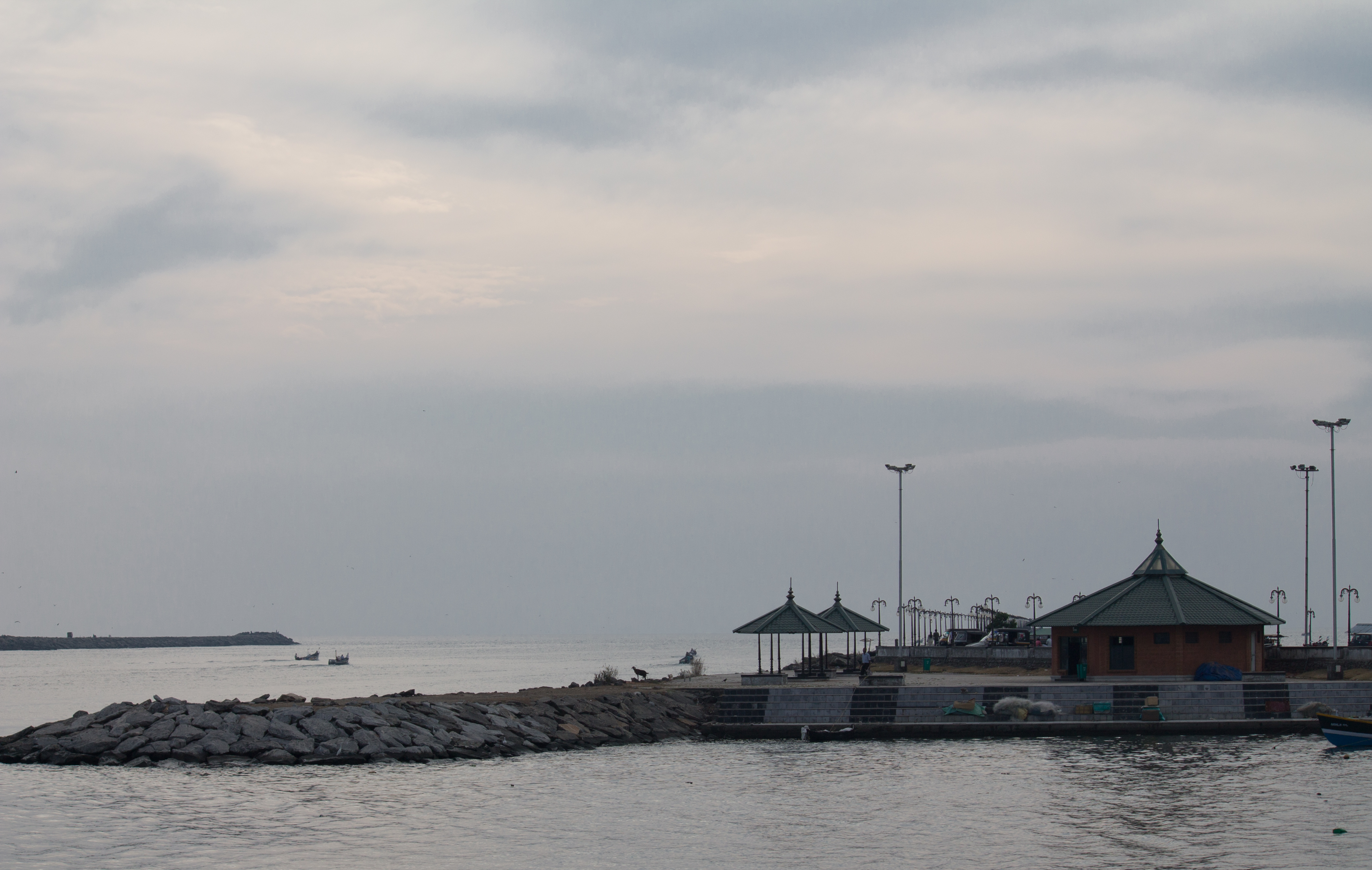
Ponnani harbour in 2012

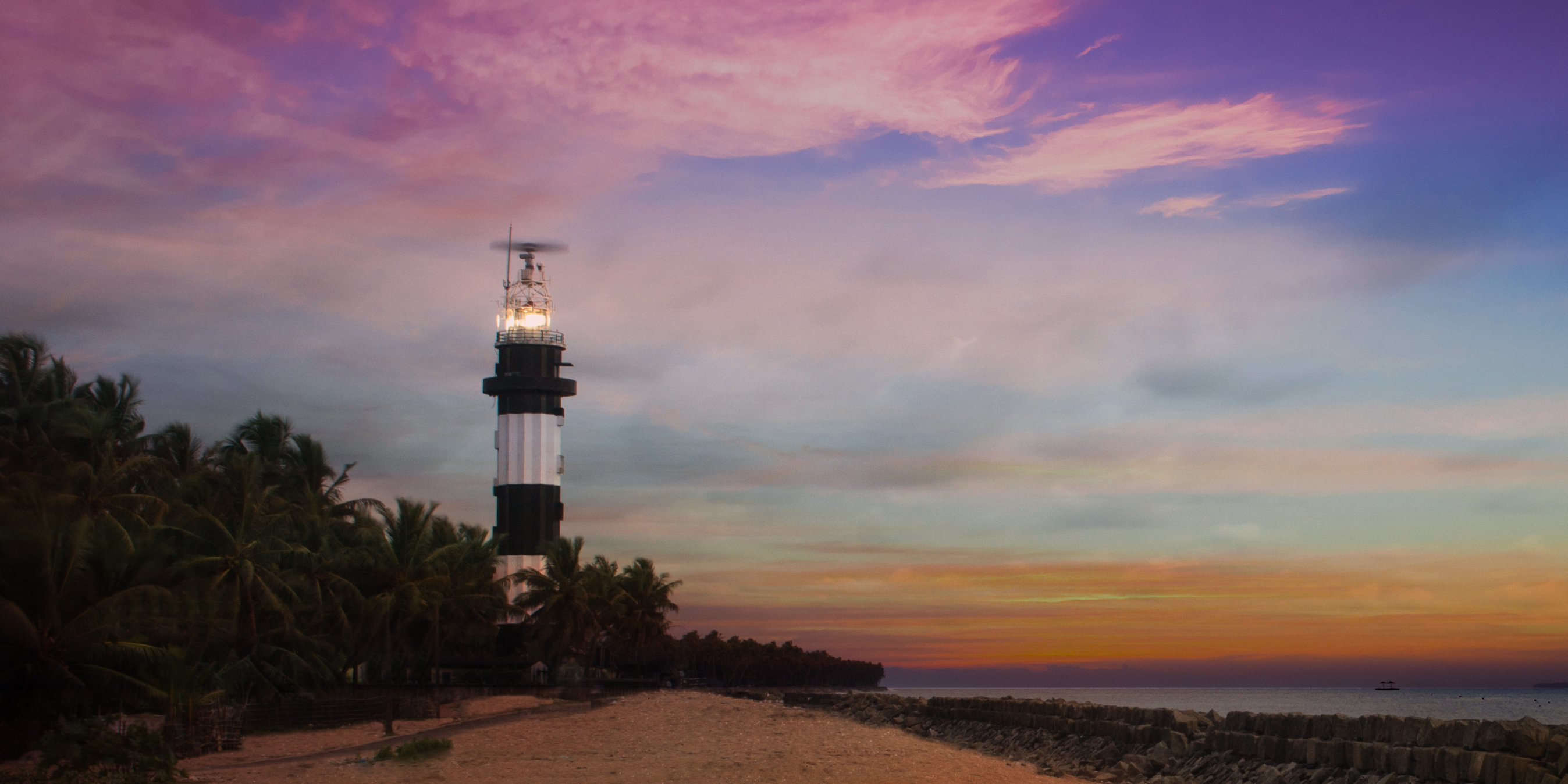
Ponnani Lighthouse

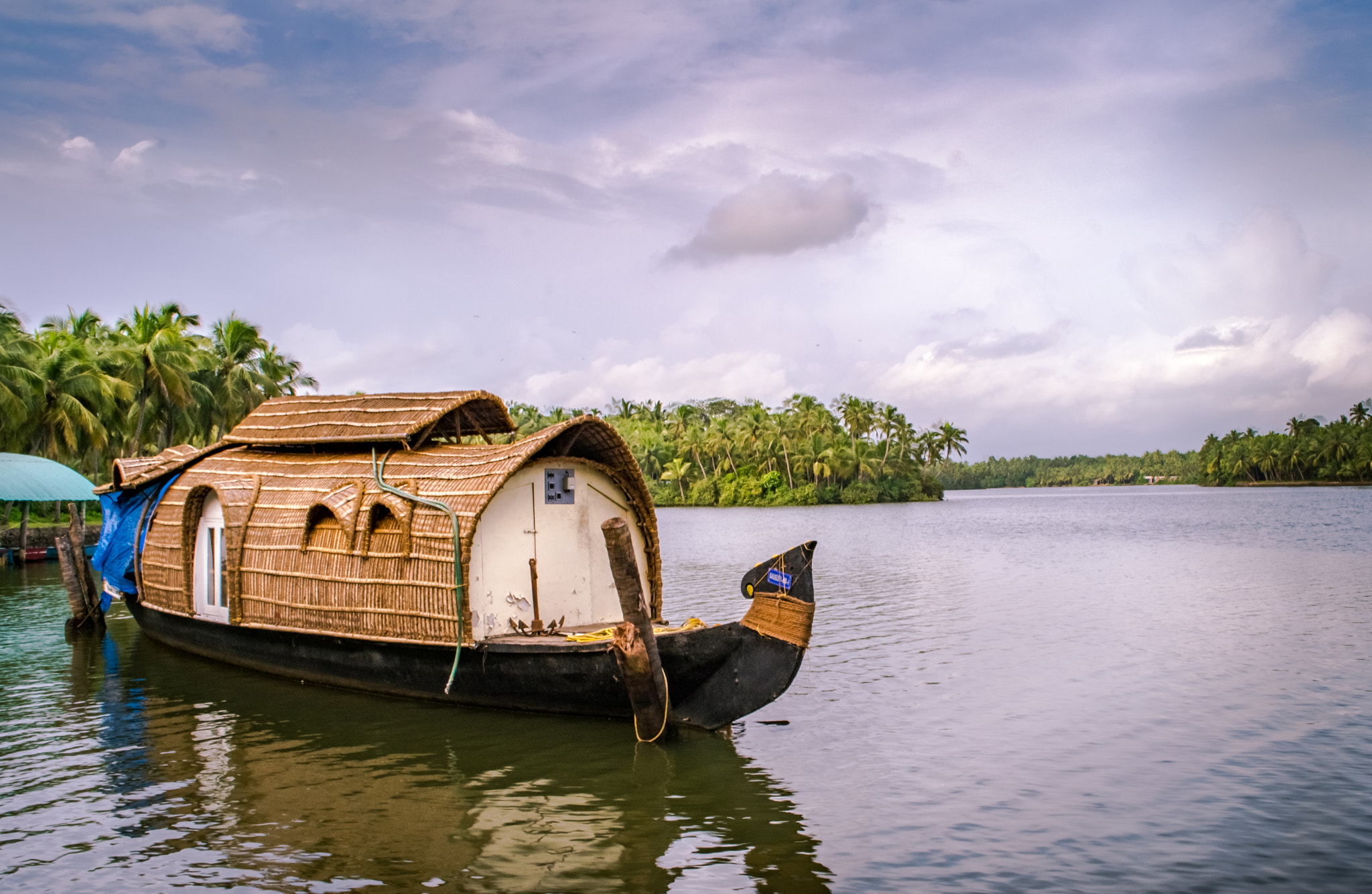
Biyyam backwater lake

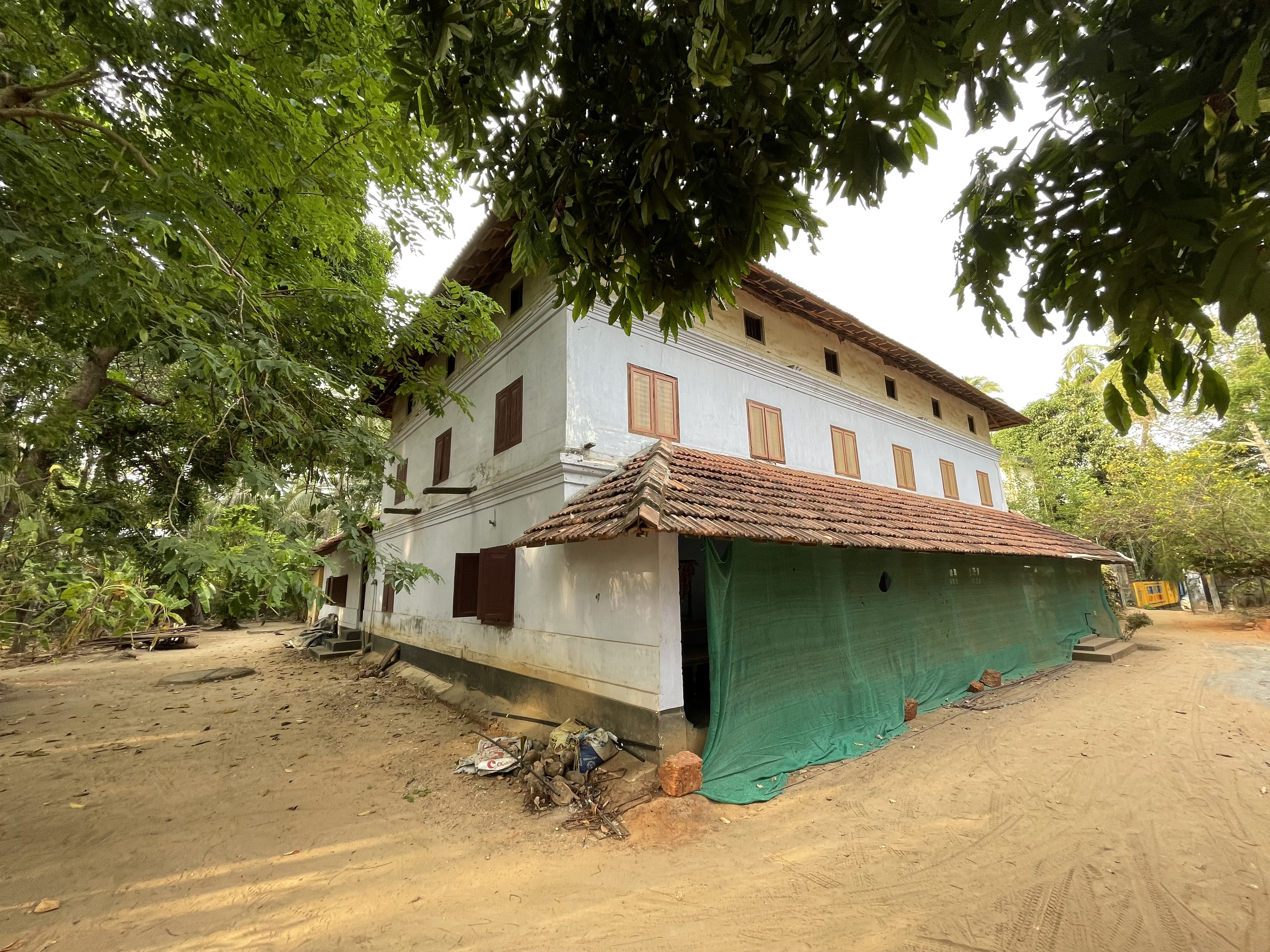
Karakkunnath Veedu-A house that played a very crucial role in Ponnani during the freedom struggle. Still standing in Ponnani. Kasturbha Gandhi lived here few days and spin yarn in Charka.

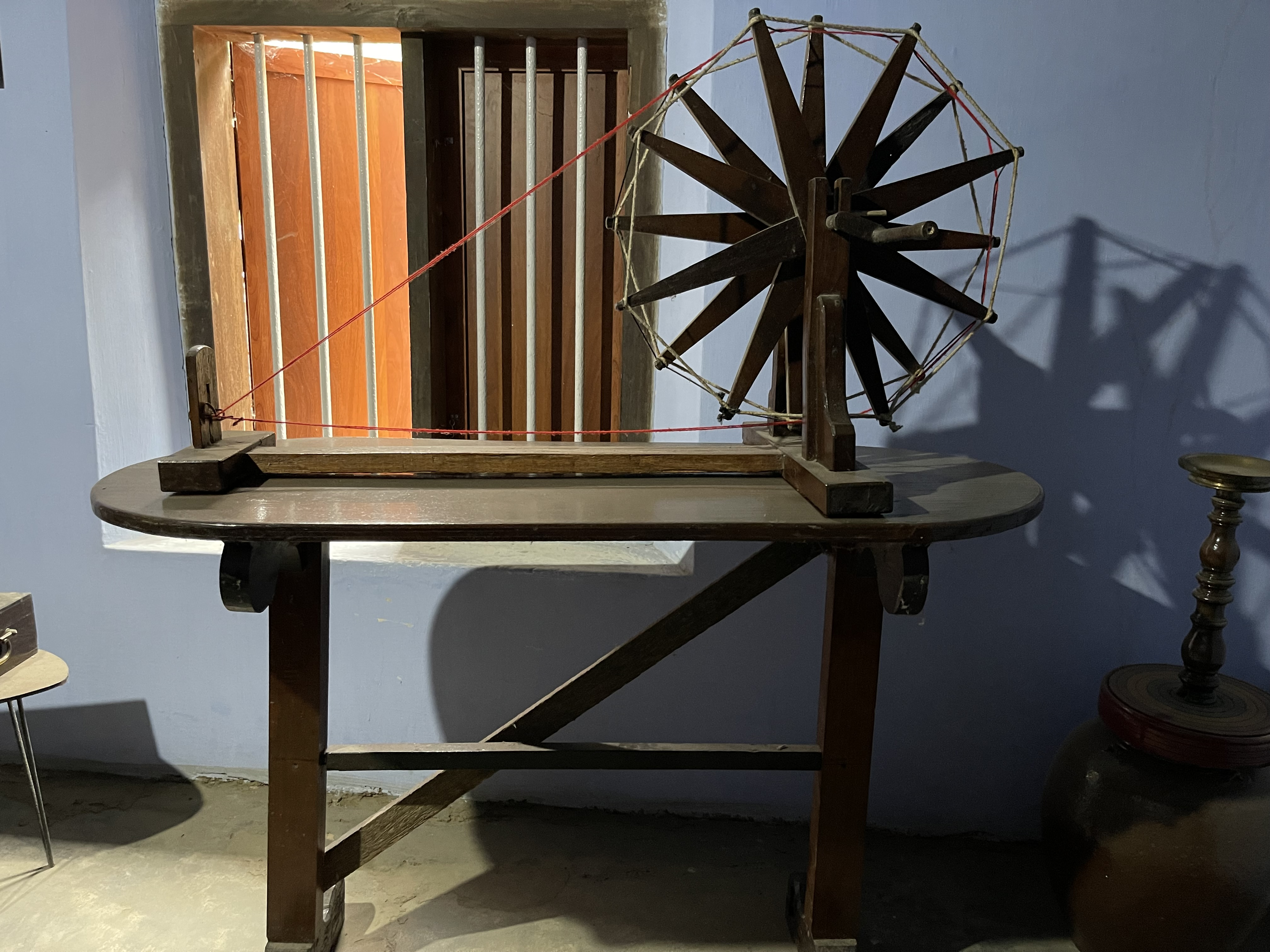
Charka in Ponnani's Karakkunnath home. During the freedom struggle, Kasturba Gandhi used to spin yarn in this charka while staying at home.

Pre-historical and Early Historical (2nd century BC – 3rd century AD) nature of this settlement is shrouded in mystery. It is one of the oldest ports in South India and can be identified with the port of Tyndis, which was a satellite feeding port to Muziris, according to the Periplus of the Erythraean Sea. Tyndis was a major center of trade, next only to Muziris, between the Cheras and the Roman Empire. The River Bharathappuzha (River Ponnani) had importance since Sangam period (1st-4th century CE), due to the presence of Palakkad Gap which connected the Malabar coast with Coromandel coast through inland. Ponnani's location at estuary of the Bharatappuzha amidst the fertile plains suitable for rice cultivation might have attracted early settlers. It is known that the river mouth - situated opposite to the plains of Coimbatore across the Ghat mountains - was accessed by the rulers of central Tamil Nadu through the Palghat Gap. It is generally assumed that the archaic Tamil chiefs came into contact with Greco-Roman navigators at the mouth of the Bharatappuzha.

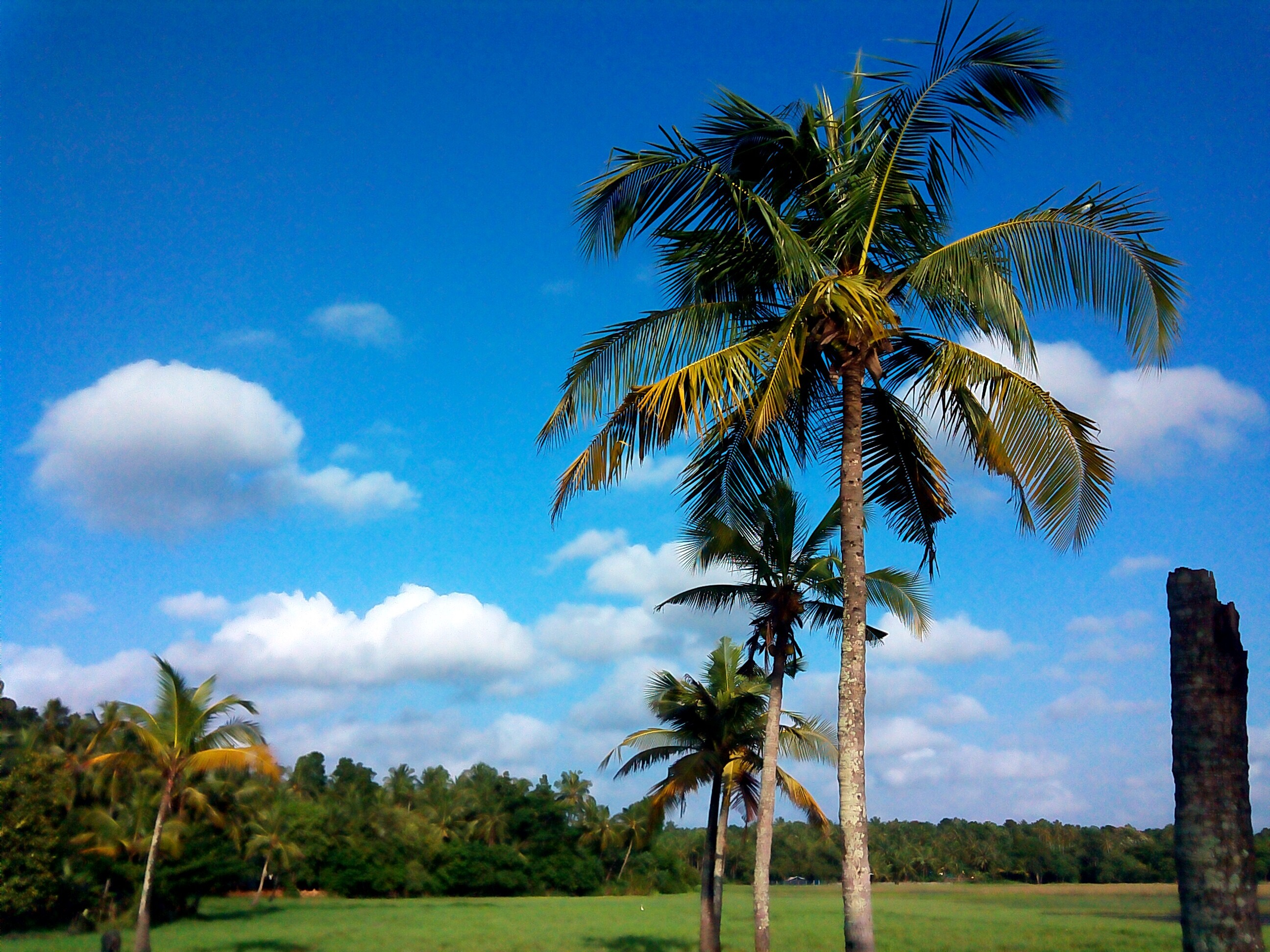
Ponnani Kole Wetlands at Edappal

Even in the latter times, Ponnani served as the major rice supplier to the Portuguese outposts in India. Throughout the Colonial rule, the Ponnani rice cargoes were shipped across the West Coast. Tobacco was the other major commodity exported from Ponnani to Goa.

Names, routes and locations of the Periplus of the Erythraean Sea (1st century CE)

Pliny the Elder (1st century CE) states that the port of Tyndis was located at the northwestern border of Keprobotos (Chera dynasty). The North Malabar region, which lies north of the port at Tyndis, was ruled by the kingdom of Ezhimala during Sangam period. According to the Periplus of the Erythraean Sea, a region known as Limyrike began at Naura and Tyndis. However the Ptolemy mentions only Tyndis as the Limyrike's starting point. The region probably ended at Kanyakumari; it thus roughly corresponds to the present-day Malabar Coast. The value of Rome's annual trade with the region was estimated at around 50,000,000 sesterces. Pliny the Elder mentioned that Limyrike was prone by pirates. The Cosmas Indicopleustes mentioned that the Limyrike was a source of peppers.

An inscription which dates back to 932 CE, found from Triprangode, mentions Goda Ravi of Chera dynasty and Thavanur. Several inscriptions written in Old Malayalam those date back to the 10th century CE, have found from Sukapuram near Ponnani, which was one of the 64 old Nambudiri villages of Kerala.

=== Pre-Portuguese era: centre of Muslim trade ===
Ponnani used to be under the control of the Brahmins of "Tirumanasseri Natu", with protection from the Vellattiri (Valluvanatu/Angatippuram) chief, in medieval times. Later the Tirumanasseri Namputiri handed over the port Ponnani to the Samutiri of Kozhikode. An arrangement was reached between the Brahmin and the Samutiri, as a result of which, the former was obliged to protect the interests of the latter against the neighboring chiefs of Valluvanatu (South Malabar) and Perumpatappu (Cochin).

As Kozhikode's political authority extended to South Malabar and Cochin, the Samutiri came to reside more and more at Ponnani (Trikkavil Palace, south of the present-day temple). The port town gradually became the second home of the Kozhikotu chiefs. By the 15th century, we know that Ponnani served as the military capital of the Samutiris of Kozhikode. The city also hosted the largest arsenal of the Kozhikotu rulers. The port at Ponnani was defended by fortifications on either bank of the river.

- At the time of the arrival of Vasco da Gama and his Portuguese fleet at Kozhikode, the Samutiri of Kozhikode was residing at Ponnani.
- When the Samutiri Kovilakam at Kozhikode was besieged by the Mysore Sultan Haidar 'Ali (18th century AD), the Samutiri sent his family members to safe heavens at Ponnani.
- It is believed that Malik ibn Dinar, the first Islamic missionary to Kerala, visited Ponnani and established a mosque.

=== Portuguese era ===
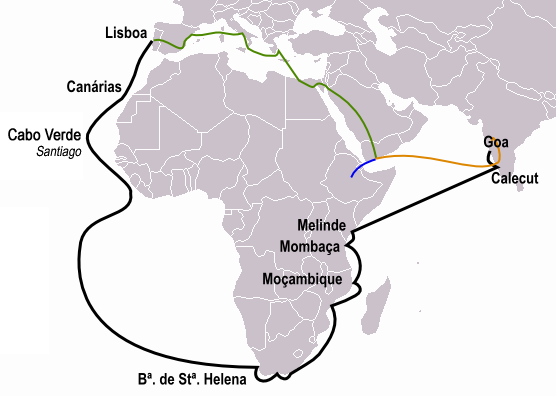
The path Vasco da Gama took to reach Kozhikode (black line) in 1498, which was also the discovery of a sea route from Europe to India, and eventually paved way for the European colonisation of Indian subcontinent. At that time, the Zamorin of Calicut was residing at Thrikkavil Kovilakam in Ponnani.

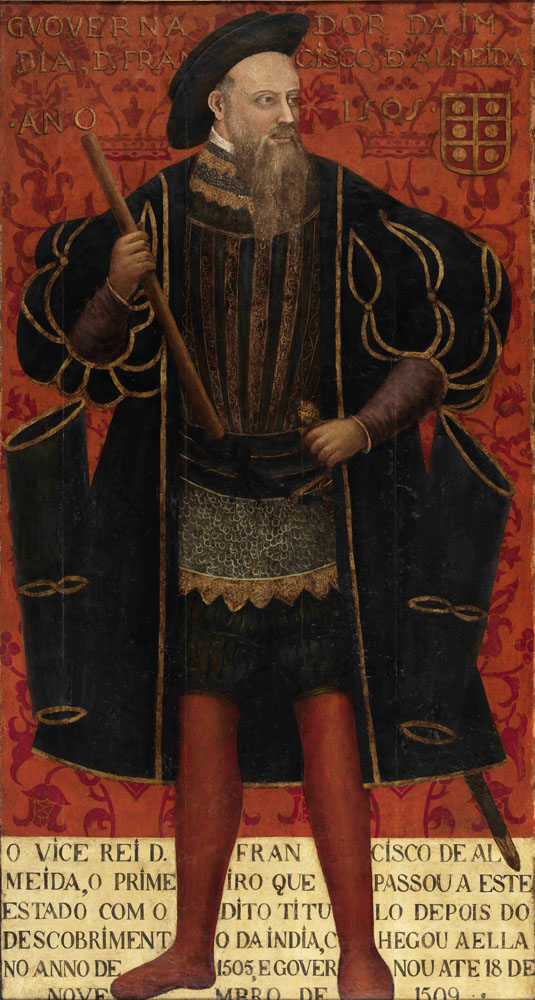
Portuguese conquistador and explorer Francisco de Almeida, Viceroy of Portuguese India, raided Ponnani in November 1507.

In the 16th century, Ponnani witnessed several battles between Kozhikode naval chiefs, known as the Kunhali Marakkars, and the Portuguese colonizers. Whenever a formal war was broke out between the Portuguese and the Kozhikode rulers, the Portuguese attacked and plundered, as the opportunity offered, the port of Ponnani.

As per some historians, the ancestral home of the Kunhali Marakkar family was at Ponnani. In course of time they spread to Tanur and other settlements of the west coast. It seems that the Kunhalis shifted their base to Putupattanam when Fransico de Almedia attacked Ponnani (1507). There is another view about the origin of Kunhali Marakkars. As per this tradition, they were descended from a Muslim merchant by name Muhammad who traded in Cochin. Muhammad and his brother were forced to leave Cochin and settle at Ponnani in the wake of the Portuguese occupation of the place which had resulted in the destruction of his ships and warehouses. The Marakkars later moved his base to Kozhikode and when Ponnani was sacked by de Menezes (1525), he offered help to the Samutiri in his fight against the Portuguese. Kutti Pokkar, a Captain in the fleet of Pattu Marakkar (Kunhali Marakkar the Third), was a native of Ponnani.

Ponnani is usually considered as the military capital of the Samutiris of Kozhikode. For an assault on Cochin in 1500 AD, the Samutiri seems to have assembled a huge army of 50,000 Nairs at Ponnani. It is widely written that the Muslims were ready to defend their bastion of Ponnani with their life ("to die as martyrs").

It is known that large number of men and vessels from Ponnani took part in a battle against the Portuguese off the coast of Kannur on 16 March 1506. In addition to the native Muslims, the Kozhikode Fleet of around two hundred large vessels carried large number of "red-coated" Turkish soldiers. Lorenzo Almeida was able to defeat this combined forces, and near 3,000 Muslims were killed the battle. The Portuguese loss was very trifling.

==== Almeida's attack ====
Towards the end of year 1507, Viceroy Francisco de Almeida was informed that a column of 13 Muslim ships had taken cargo - mainly spices - from Ponnani and were about to leave for the Red Sea. The Viceroy immediately decided corner the fleet. The decision was perhaps made with a view to retrieve the Portuguese prestige lost on account of the some incidents at Angediva and Dabul. Almeida himself commandeered the fleet of 12 vessels consisting of four naus, six caravels and two gales. The fleet had about 6,000 European soldiers, led by a collection of noblemen such as Pero Barreti, Diogo Pires, Lourenco de Almeida, and Nuno da Cunha, son of Tristao da Cunha and a handful of Cochin Nairs.

Ponnani at the time was defended by a strong battery of artillery (forty guns), and a number of well-armed ships under Kutti Ali. Kutti Ali of Ponnani was a powerful captain of the Samutiri Fleet having with him more than 7,000 armed men. The harbor was protected by fortifications on either side of the entrances. The Portuguese writers later recorded that "the men were rather frightened by the prayers and shouts of the enemy" as approached the port. Tristao da Cunha defeated the Muslim forces (24 November 1507) in the subsequent engagement. Eighteen Portuguese were killed in the assault. Lorenzo was wounded by the Muslims and the fight was stubborn. Muslim ships were burnt, and the Portuguese seized their arms and ammunitions. The commodities that were made ready for despatch to Red Sea were also taken over by the Portuguese. The Ponnani town was looted, burnt and destroyed.

The defenses of the Ponnani Port were repaired and strengthened after this event. It seems that Kunhali Marakkar I, assisted by Kutti Ali and Pacchi Marakkar, subsequently constructed a naval base at Ponnani. Kutti Ali sent harassing raids from Ponnani to Cochin and reinforcement fleets to Kozhikode.

==== Meneses' attack ====
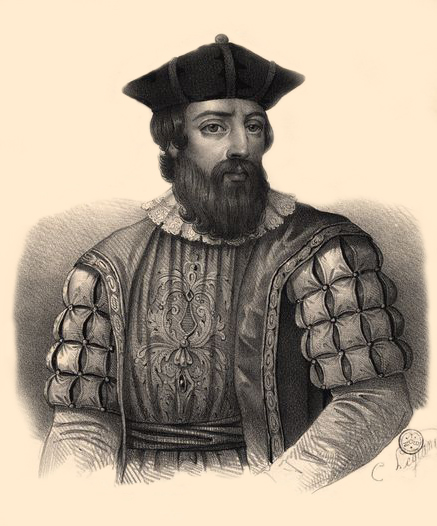
Viceroy Henrique de Meneses conquered Ponnani in 1525.

Portuguese Viceroy Henrique de Meneses appeared off the coast of Ponnani on 25 February 1525 with a fleet of 50 ships, including 19 grabs supplied by the chief of Purakkad. After an unsuccessful mission in Cochin, the Samutiri army was camping at Ponnani. Meneses sent initially some soldiers to the shore for water and provisions. But they were set upon and driven back.

Next morning (26 February), the Portuguese landed in forces, and a fierce engagement took place the newly developed base at Ponnani. Thirty-eight ships belonging to Chinna Kutti Ali were burnt; a large number of Mappilas were killed, the coconut trees on either bank of the River Ponnani were cut by the Cochin Nairs, and houses, shops and mosques were all destroyed. The Ponnani town was partially burnt in the assault. The cutting of the coconut trees in a region was considered as a method of punishment to the inhabitants. In 1528, a strong Portuguese fleet cornered Kutti Ali off the coast of Bankur and he was taken prisoner.

==== Treaty of Ponnani ====
The Portuguese Viceroy Garcia de Noronha signed a peace treaty with the Samutiri of Kozhikode on board the ship St. Mattheus at Ponnani on 1 January 1540. As per the agreement, called the Treaty of Ponnani, the Samutiri granted the Portuguese the virtual monopoly, of trade in pepper and ginger at Kozhikode, accepted the Portuguese Passes (the infamous "cartazes") for the navigation of Arab vessels and gave assurances of non-intervention in the wars of the Portuguese with other native powers [such as Cochin].

Terms of the Treaty (1540)

- The Portuguese were to buy all the Kozhikode pepper at the Cochin rate and ginger at 92 fanams per bahar, and allow the Samutiri of Kozhikode to send 3.5 bahar of pepper to Portugal on his own account for every 100 bahars bought by the Portuguese.
- The Portuguese agreed to sell part of their merchandise at Kozhikode, so that the Samutiri of Kozhikode might have his customary dues on imports, and to provide the Samutiri of Kozhikode with quicksilver, vermilion and coal.
- The Treaty bound the Portuguese also to neutrality even if the Samutiri of Kozhikode attacked their allies. In return the Samutiri of Kozhikode agreed to accept the Portuguese Passports for the Moorish vessels.

In 1552, the Samutiri of Kozhikode received assistance in heavy guns landed at Ponnani, brought by certain Yoosuf, a Turk, who had sailed against the monsoon winds. In 1566 and again in 1568, Kutti Pokkar of Ponnani and his men captured two Portuguese ships. Around a thousand soldiers from one of these ships were killed either by the sword or drowning. Kutti Pokkar was later in killed off the coast of Mangalore, while returning from a successful raid on the Portuguese fort there.

A Portuguese fleet of 40 vessels under the command of Diogo de Meneses is known to have pillaged Ponnani, sometime before 1570 AD. It is also known that Gil Eanes Mascarenhas opened fire from his ships to Ponnani port and killed large number of natives in 1582. Mascarenhas was later captured, and executed by the forces of Kunhali Marakkar.

Muslims from Ponnani is known to have actively participated in the Siege of Fort Chaliyam in 1571. The Samutiri of Kozhikode sent against the Fort Chaliyam certain of his ministers in command over the Muslims of Ponnani, who were assisted by bodies of people from Chaliyam.

==== Portuguese Fort ====
The Portuguese had earlier (around 1528, under da Cunha) tried to construct a fort on the north bank of the Vaikkal river mouth at Ponnani. This piece of land belonged to the chief of Bettem. The ships coming from Cochin with materials for construction - like stones and mortars - reached near Vaikkal. But all the vessels except one "mast vessel" were destroyed by being dashed to the shore in a storm. Some Portuguese men were drowned and some were captured. The cannons recovered came under the possession of the Samutiri of Kozhikode.

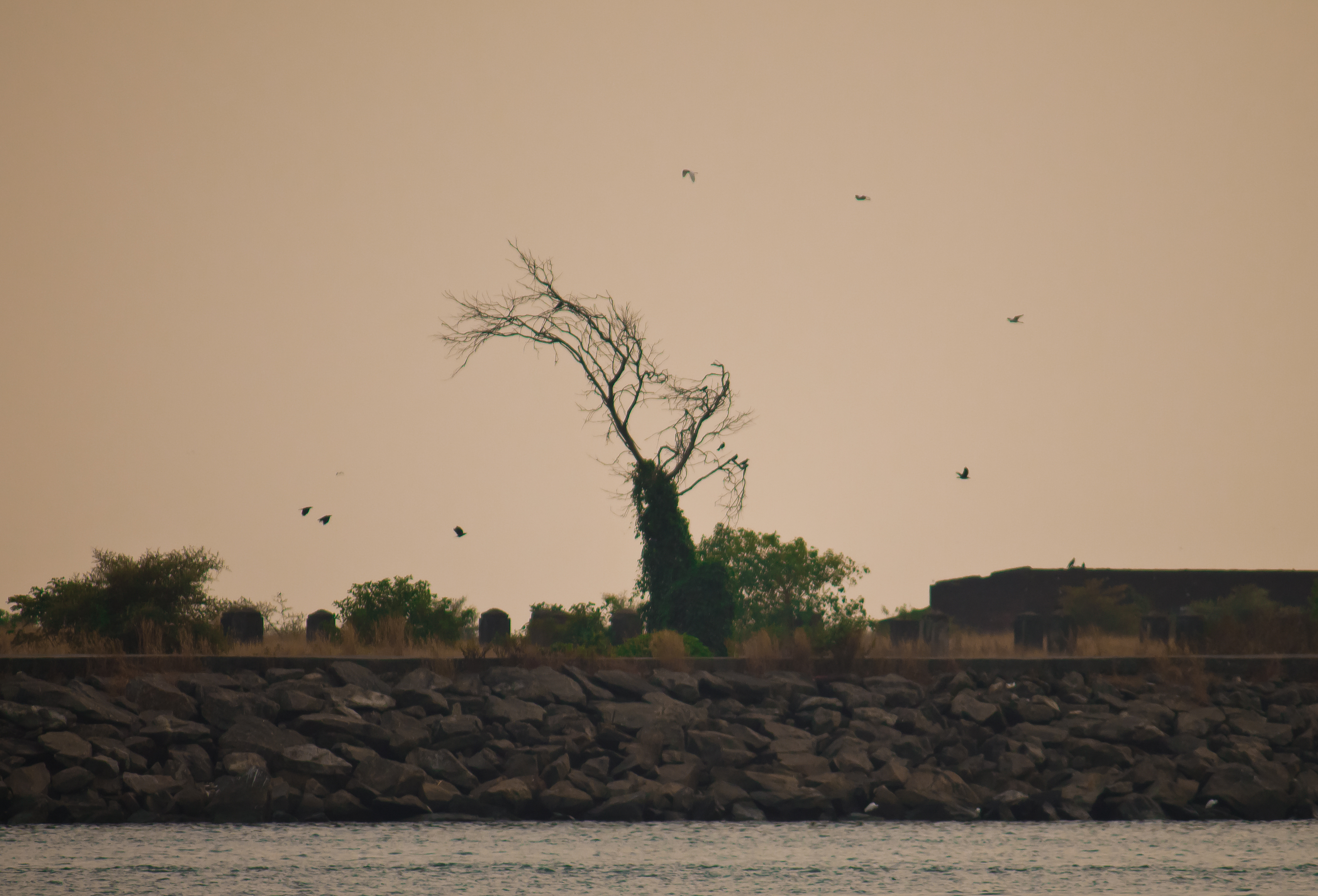
Ponnani Harbour

As per an agreement (1584) between the Samutiri and the Portuguese, the Kozhikode allowed the Portuguese to have a factory, instead of a fort, at Ponnani, obtaining in return the right of navigation for the Muslims to the ports of Gujarat, Persia and Arabia. Dom Jeronimo Mascaranhas, who was instrumental in signing the contract with the ruler of Kozhikode, was appointed the Captain of the Factory at Ponnani. The decision was deeply resented by the Kunhali Marakkar III.

Sooner rather than later, Duarte de Menezes entrusted Ruy Goncalves de Carmara command of an expedition determined to erect a fort proper at Ponnani. Goncalves proceeded to Ponnani, from where he dispatched a message to the Samutiri of Kozhikode, informing him of the object of his visit, and requesting that he would meet him with the view of selecting a suitable site. The Kozhikode chief kept Goncalves waiting for some time on the plea that his Brahmins were unable to fix upon an auspicious date whereupon Goncalves sent the Brahmins some presents, and they then speedily named a favorable hour for the purpose. The construction of a Portuguese fort at Ponnani began in 1585. Gonsalves, being in a hurry to depart, erected only a fort of wood. Rui Gomes de Gram, the first Captain of the Fort, is known to have strengthened the defenses on the Ponnani. He pulled down the wooded structures and erected one of stone of considerable strength. Gasper Fagundes, who was in the Ponnani Fort in 1586, was asked by the Portuguese Governor to offer his services to the Samutiri of the Kozhikode against the Kunhali Marakkar. By an agreement (1597) between the Samutiri of Kozhikode and the Portuguese, the former agreed to give site to the latter to erect a church at Ponnani.

=== Dutch Factory ===
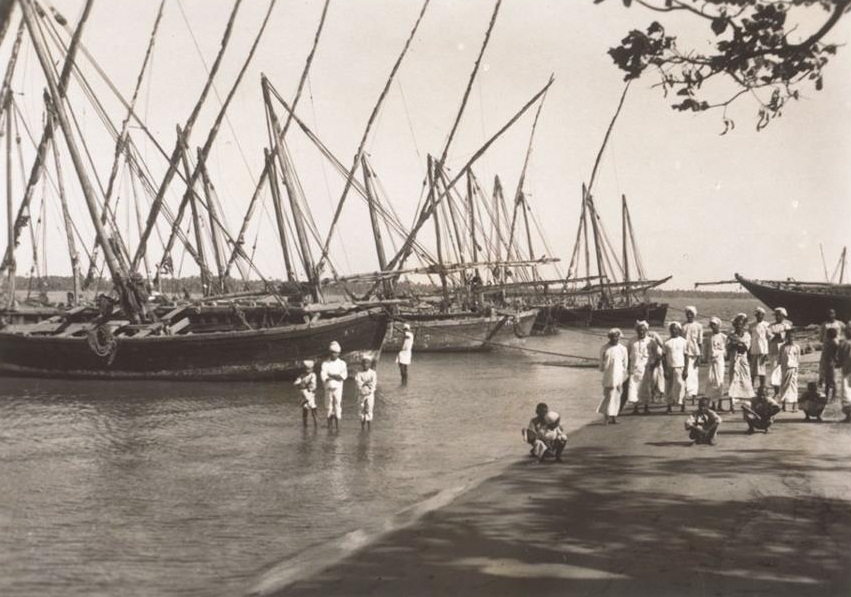
Ponnani harbour in the mid-1930s

By a treaty signed between the Dutch Admiral Steven Van der Hagen and the Samutiri of Kozhikode (11 November 1604), the Dutch were permitted to open a factory at Ponnani in return for their help against the Portuguese. The factory served as a military outpost of the Dutch East India Company. A Dutch Resident was in charge of the settlement. The aim of the residency was to keep "peace" with the Samutiri of Kozhikode and to watch the activities of the other European powers and the native enemies of the Dutch Company. Stein van Gollenesse wanted to cover the residency building with tiles. But the Samutiri never consented to the proposal, fearing that it would increase the Dutch influence. The chief directed Gollenesse's successor to re-thatch it every year with new coconut leaves. In 1607, the Dutch had inaugurated negotiations with the Samutiri of Kozhikode at Ponnani.

English ships captained by James Keeling, sailing from Surat, is known to have visited Ponnani around 1615 AD.

On 12 February, a friendly reception was given by the Samutiri of Kozhikode to French Viceroy de la Haye and M. Caron (French Company) at Ponnani. M. Coche, a young Parisian clerk in the French Company's service, took up his residence at Ponnani as a token of gratitude.

A meeting between Father Carre and M. Coche took place off Ponnani on 10 November 1674. According to this narrative, young Coche was "almost metamorphosed into an Indian" by his stay at Ponnani. Carre also met Aubert, a French merchant in the English Company's service. The ship carrying Father Abbe was detained at Ponnani over a dispute over delivery of goods - mainly pepper. Carre took the opportunity to travel by land, with the escort of four Nairs, to Tellicherry Factory.

On 8 March 1747, it was the Dutch Resident at Ponnani who reported to the Malabar Council the plan of the Samutiri of Kozhikode to occupy by surprise the Fort Chetwai under the pretext of going to Cochin. The alertness of the Ponnani deterred the Samutiri from making the attack. In 1755, the Samutiri's plan to attack the land of Payencherry Nair, a Dutch ally, was also exposed by the Ponnani Residency.

A meeting between Commandeur van Rheede and the Samutiri of Kozhikode, over the cession of Chetwai, took place at Ponnani in 1678 AD.

=== Under the Sultans of Mysore ===
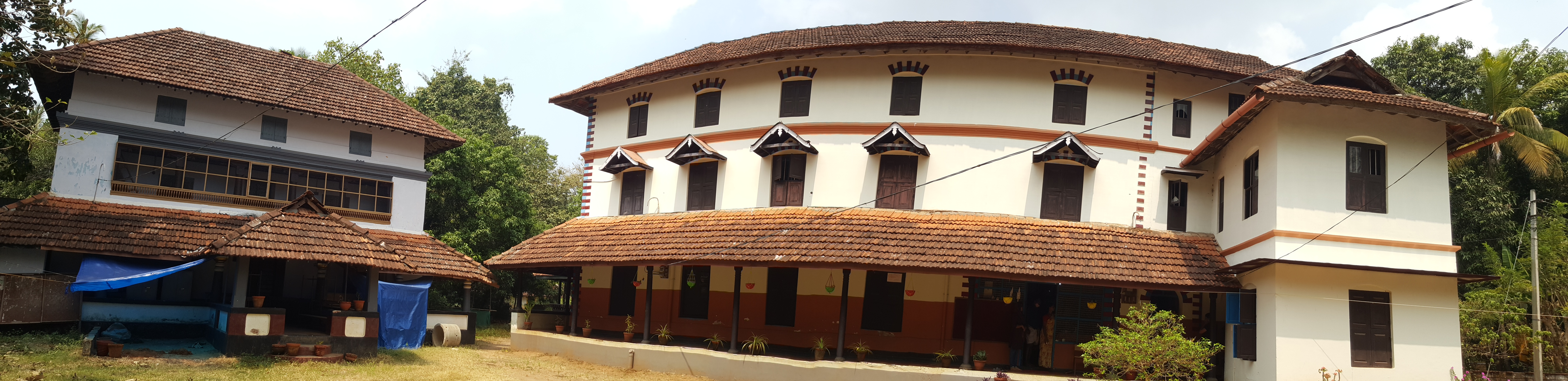
Hariharamangalam Mana

Hyder Ali, Sultan of Mysore conquered northern Kerala in 1766 and established an outpost at Ponnani. His successor Tippu Sultan developed the port at Ponnani for trade, and for strategic reasons. Tipu considered Ponnani as a major exporting centre in Malabar.

=== Ponnani Canal ===
Ponnani Canal was constructed for the transportation of goods from Ponnani to Tirur railway station. Here is a description about the Ponnani Canal by Basel Mission employees at Codacal.

...nowadays a steamship travels between Ponani and Tirur through the Canal, where the most convenient railway station for Ponnani is to be found. The ticket costs only 4 annas, although the distance is 10 km...

=== Response to British Colonial rule ===
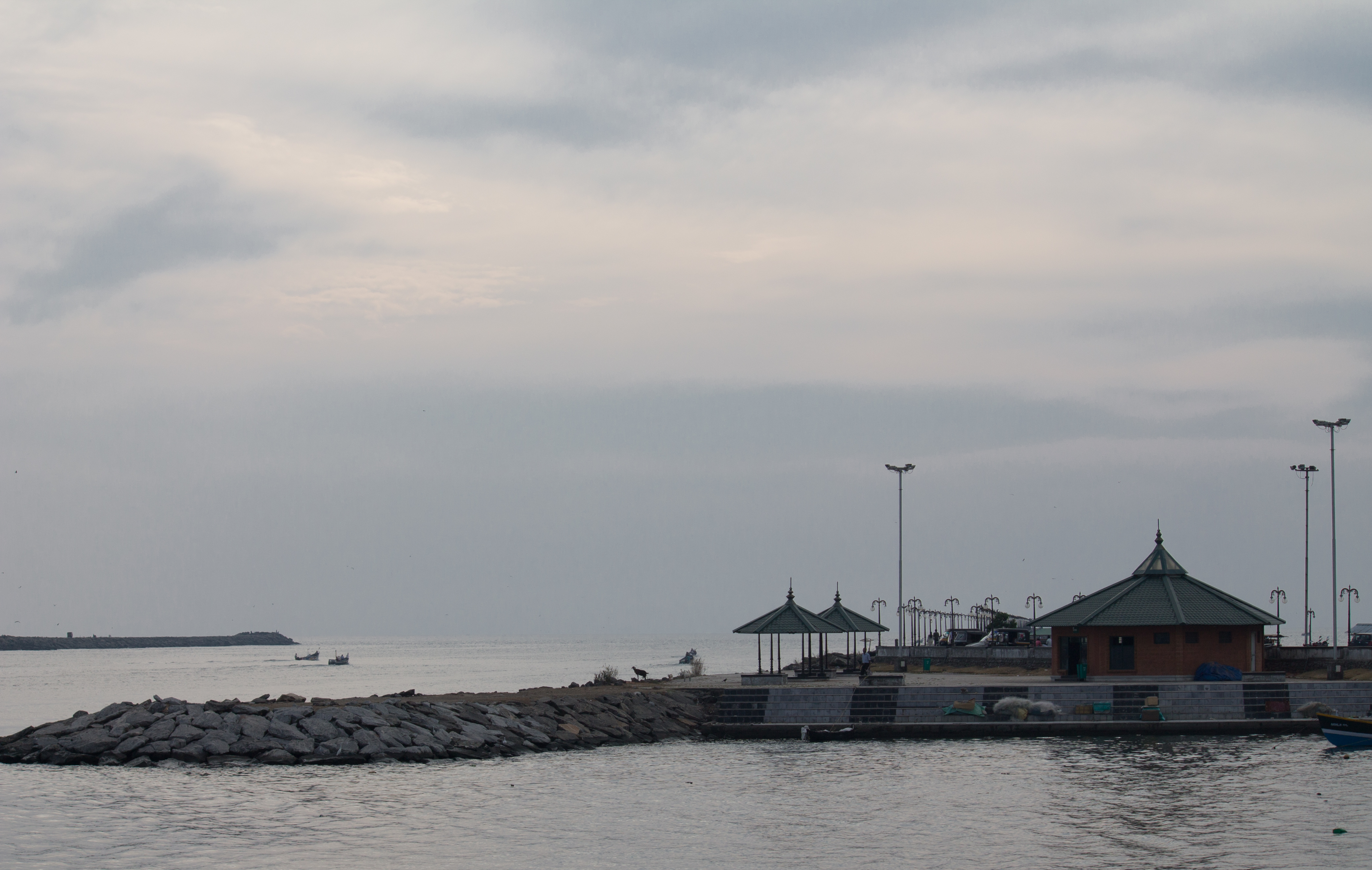
Fishing boats at Ponnani. Presently Ponnani Port is reduced to the status of a major fishing centre

Ponnani was a major hub of Indian nationalist movement in Malabar District during the British Raj. Ponnani region was the working platform of K. Kelappan, popularly known as Kerala Gandhi, Vakeel Raman Menon, known as Ponnani Gandhi, A. V. Kuttimalu Amma, and Mohammed Abdur Rahiman, and several other freedom fighters. Other independence activists from Ponnani taluk included Lakshmi Sehgal, V. T. Bhattathiripad, and Ammu Swaminathan. The ashes of Mahatma Gandhi, Jawaharlal Nehru, and Lal Bahadur Shastri, were deposited in Kerala at Tirunavaya, on the bank of the river Bharathappuzha.

Ali Musaliyar (1854 - 1921), one of principle leaders of the 1921 Mappila Rebellion, had studied at the Ponnani madrasa. Sayyid S. Makti Tangal (d. 1912), an influential Mappila theological reformer, was a native of Ponnani.

K. V. Raman Menon (1900–1974), known as Ponnani Gandhi, was a reputed Indian National Congress leader of the time who had actively participated in the freedom movement against the British in Malabar District. He was a social reformer and was a leading lawyer of the Court of Ponnani.

Presently, Ponnani is one of the major fishing centers in Malappuram.

== The Makhdums of Ponnani ==
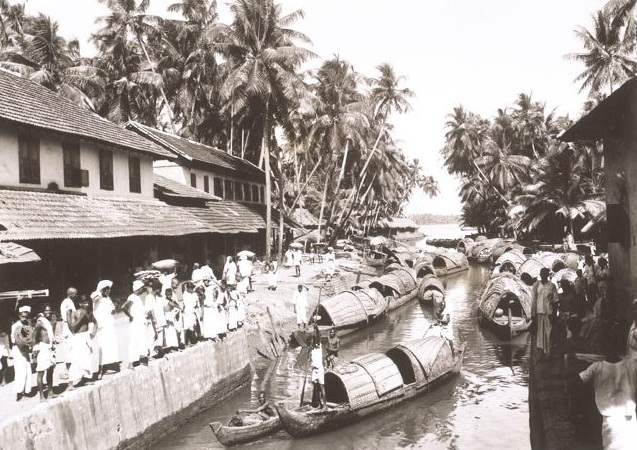
The Ponnani Canal at Ponnani (in the 1930s)

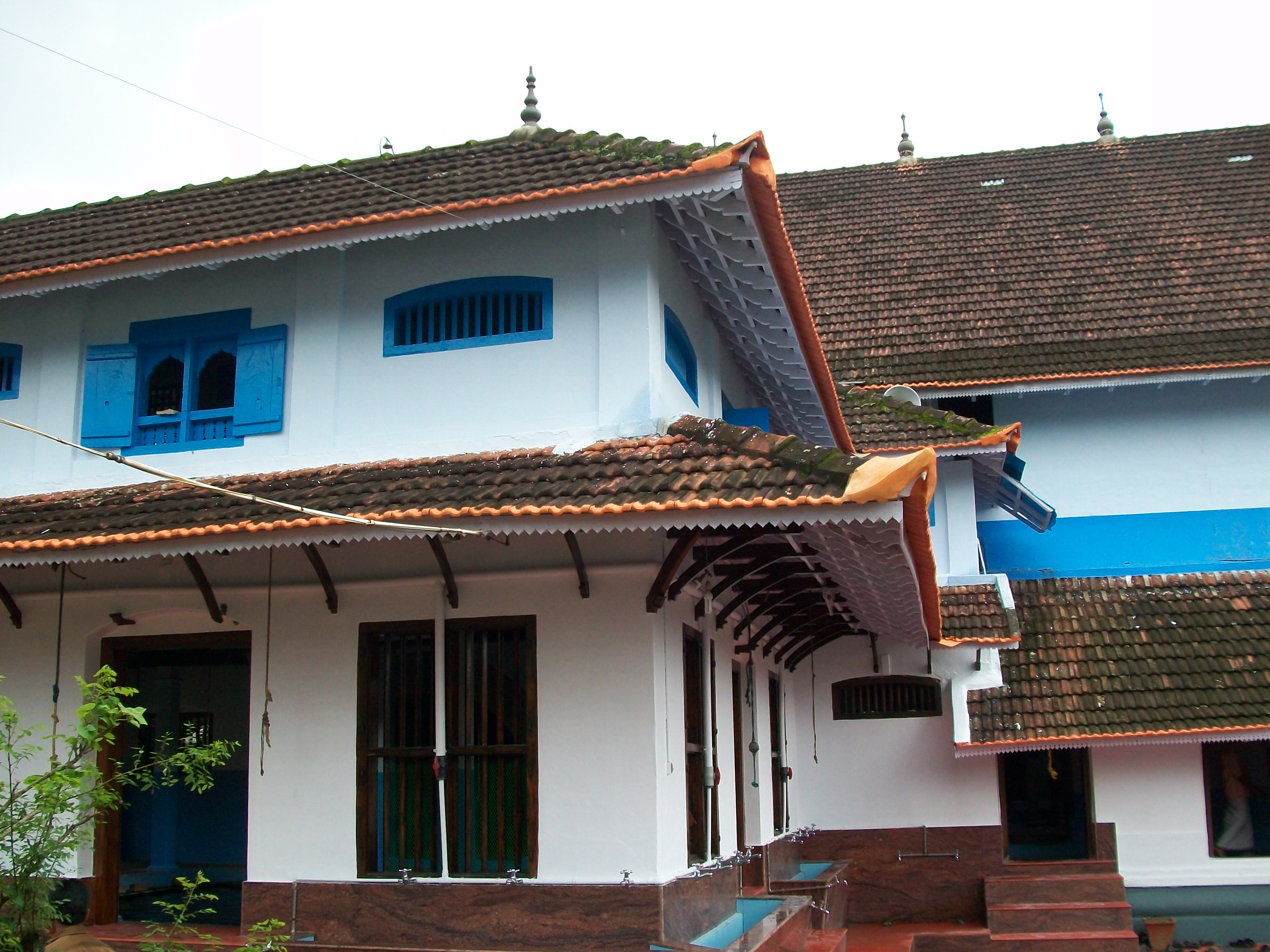
The Ponnani Mosque, a view from the north

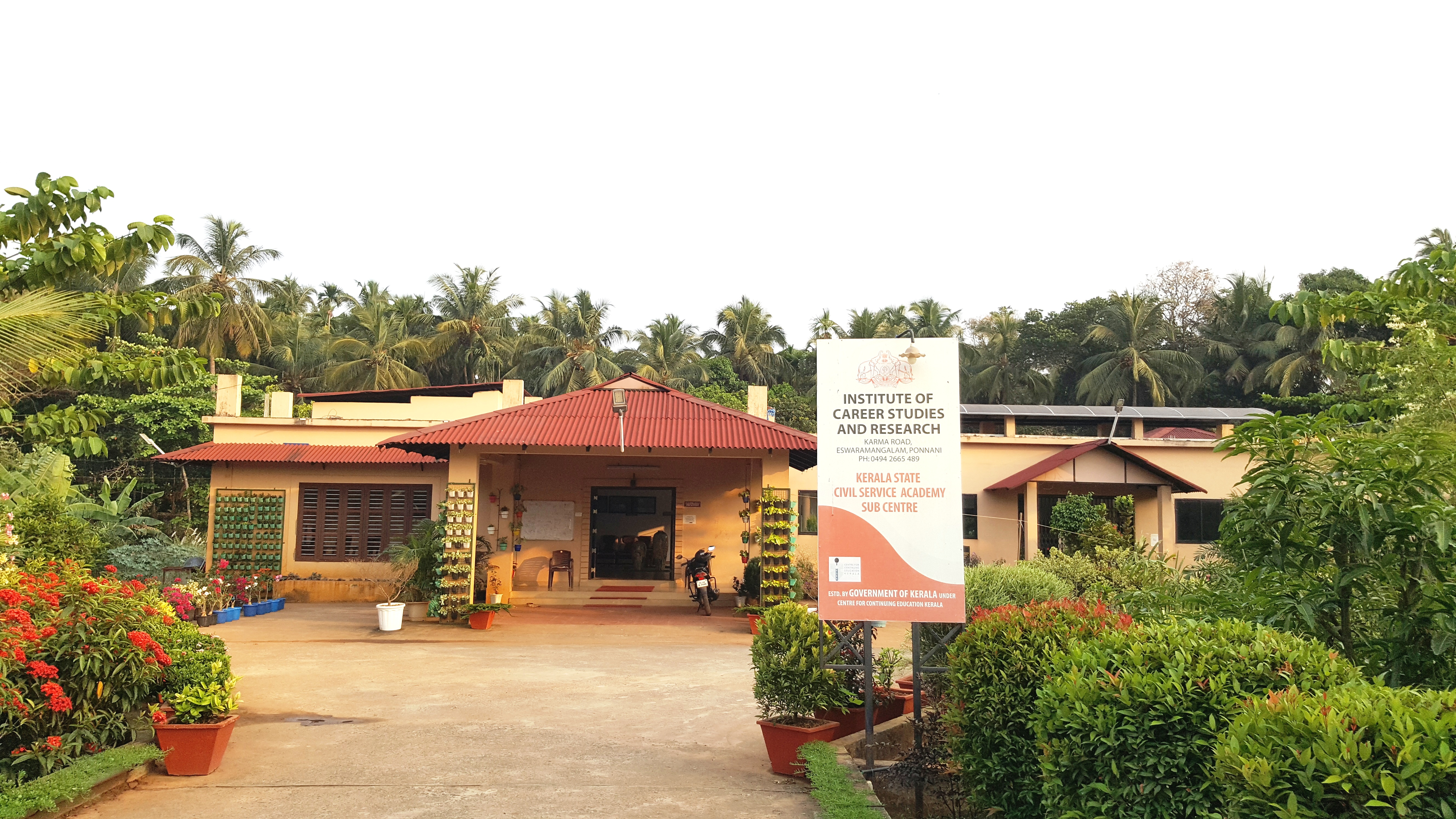
Institute of Career and Research, near Eswaramangalam, Ponnani

It is known that the Makhdum family sailed from Yemen to South India to propagate Islam. The family initially settled in Tamil Nadu (the Ma'bar region), before moving to Cochin (15th century) and later to Ponnani.

== Ponnani cuisine ==
Ponnani has a wide variety of indigenous dishes. The centuries of maritime trade has given the Ponnani a cosmopolitan cuisine. The cuisine is a blend of traditional Keralite, Persian, Yemenese and Arab food culture. One of the main elements of this cuisine is pathiri, a pancake made of rice flour. Variants of pathiri include neypathiri (made with ghee), poricha pathiri (fried rather than baked), meen pathiri (stuffed with fish), and irachi pathiri (stuffed with beef). Spices like black pepper, cardamom, and clove are widely used in the cuisine of Ponnani. Muttappathiri is another popular breakfast snack. The main item used in the festivals is the Malabar style of biryani. Sadhya is also seen in marriage and festival occasions. Snacks such as arikadukka, chattipathiri, muttamala, pazham nirachathu, and unnakkaya have their own style in Ponnani. Besides these, other common food items of Kerala are also seen in the cuisine of Ponnani. The Malabar version of biryani, popularly known as kuzhi mandi in Malayalam, is another popular item, which has an influence from Yemen.

== Demographics ==
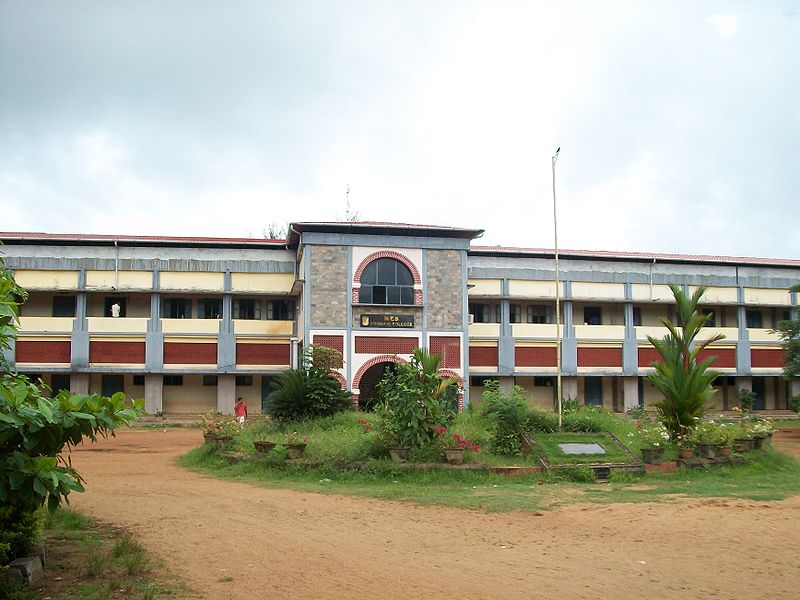
MES College, Ponnani

As of 2011 India census, Ponnani Municipality had a population of 90,491. Males constitute 47% of the population and females 53%. Ponnani has an average literacy rate of 90.00%. Male literacy is 93.36%, and female literacy is 87.07%. At Ponnani, 13.17% of the population is under 7 years of age. The matrilineal system of succession (Marumakkathayam) was prevalent among the Muslim families of Ponnani.

Around 68.31% of the population are Muslims and 31.02% are Hindus. Schedule Caste (SC) constitutes 5.75% while Schedule Tribe (ST) were 0.22% of total population in Ponnani (M).

== Places of interest ==
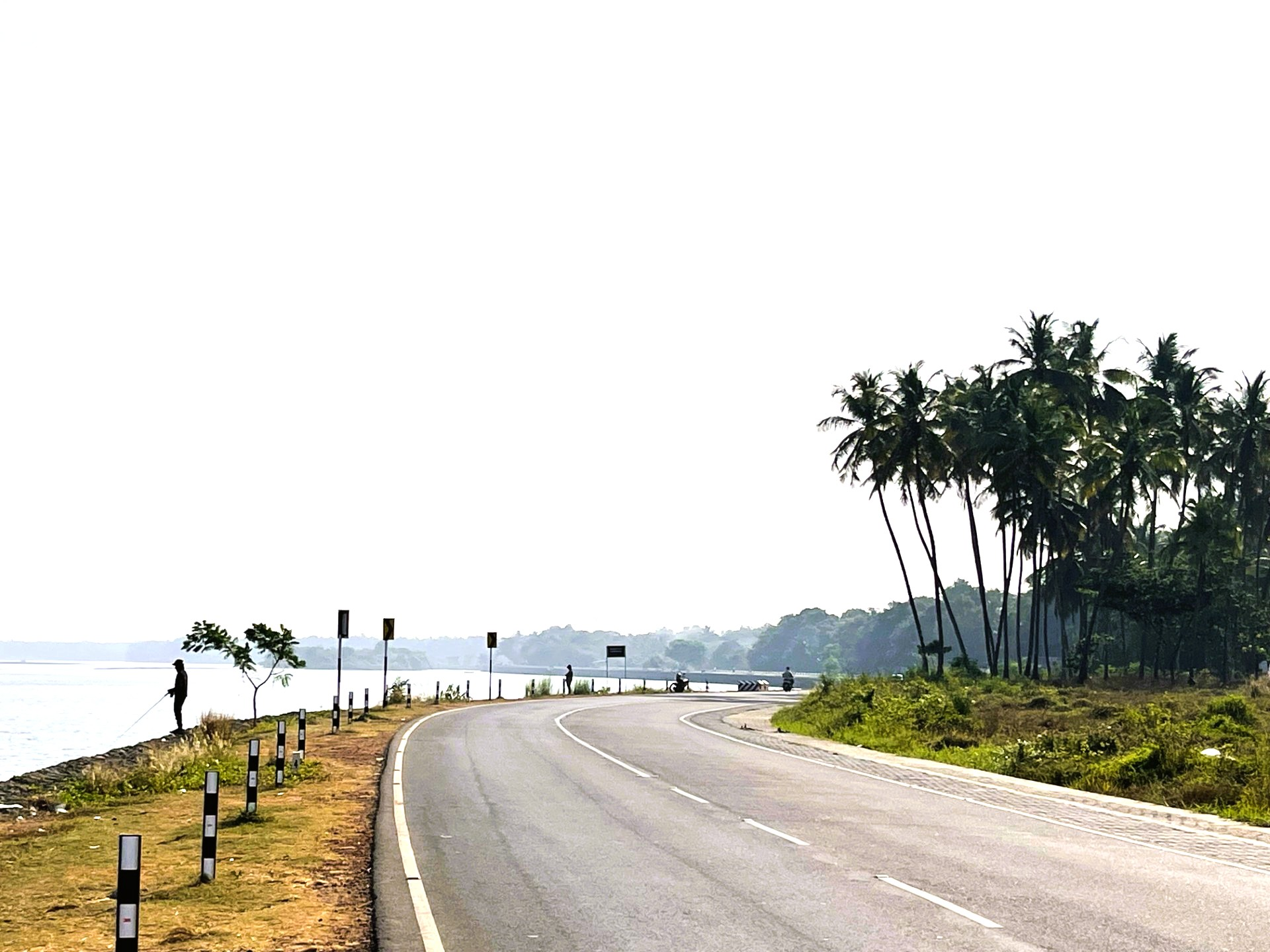
Karma Road, Ponnani

- Ponnani Jum'ah Masjid
- Misri Masjid, a 16th-century mosque built in the Zamorin period
- Mausoleum of Jarattingal Tangal
- Mausoleum of Makhdum Tangal
- Trikkavu Temple
- Kanda Kurumba Kavu
- House of the Makhdums
- Ponnani Beach
- Patinjarekkara Beach
- Ponnani Azhimukam
- Ponnani Karma Road
- Chamravattam Bridge
- Biyyam Kayal
- Biyyam Hanging Bridge
- Biyyam Park
- Ponnani Harbour

== Civic administration ==
The town is administered by Ponnani Municipality, headed by a chairperson. For administrative purposes, the town is divided into 51 wards, from which the members of the municipal council are elected for a term of five years.

Ponnani Municipality

=== Ponnani Municipality Election 2020 ===
S.No.	Party name	Party symbol	Number of Councillors
01	LDF		38
02	UDF		10
03	BJP		03
04	Independents		00

=== Law and Order ===
The municipality comes under the jurisdiction of the Ponnani police station, which was formed in 1932. The station has the jurisdiction over the municipality of Ponnani and the Gram panchayats of Veliyankode, Kalady, and Edappal.

The jurisdictional courts of Ponnani Police Station are Judicial First Class Magistrate Court at Ponnani, Subdivisional Magistrate Court at Tirur, and Sessions Court at Manjeri.

The border police stations are headquartered at Changaramkulam, Kuttippuram, Perumbadappu, Tirur, and Thrithala. Ponnani Police Station comes under the Tirur Subdivision of Malappuram District Police, which is one of the six subdivisions of the district police.

Ponnani is also headquarters of the Coastal Police Station of Malappuram District. The station has jurisdiction over the whole coastal area of the district, starting from Kadalundi Nagaram beach, bordering Kozhikode district in the north, to Palappetty beach, bordering Thrissur district in the south. It has a coastal length of 72 km.

== Wards of Ponnani ==
The Ponnani Municipality is composed of the following 51 wards:

Ward no.	Name	Ward no.	Name
1	Azheekkal	2	Pallikkadavu
3	Chana	4	Velleeri
5	Kuttikkad	6	Ezhuvathiruthy
7	Welfare	8	Thevarkshetram
9	Kottathara	10	Chamravattam
11	Eswaramangalam	12	Neithallur
13	Kotta	14	Erikkamanna
15	Puzhambram	16	Biyyam
17	Andithode	18	Boat Jetty
19	Pulikkakadavu	20	Junction
21	Theyyangad	22	Karukathiruthi
23	Attupuram	24	Fisheries School
25	Kadavanad South	26	Kadavanad North
27	Ayyappankavu	28	Pallapram West
29	Uroob Nagar	30	Pullonath Athani
31	Chanthapadi	32	Thrikkavu East
33	Thrikkavu	34	Vandipetta
35	M.I.A	36	Puthankulam
37	Thekkepuram	38	Parankivalappu
39	Municipal Office	40	Cherupalli
41	Puthuponnani South	42	Puthuponnani North
43	Mailanchikadu	44	Nayady Colony
45	Murinjazhi	46	MES College
47	Mukkadi	48	Aliyarpalli
49	Govt. Hospital	50	Marakadavu
51	Meentheruvu		

== Ponnani Block ==
Ponnani Block Panchayat is the local body responsible for the block-level administration of the following Gram panchayats:

- Thavanur
- Kalady
- Vattamkulam
- Edappal

== Geography ==
=== Transportation ===
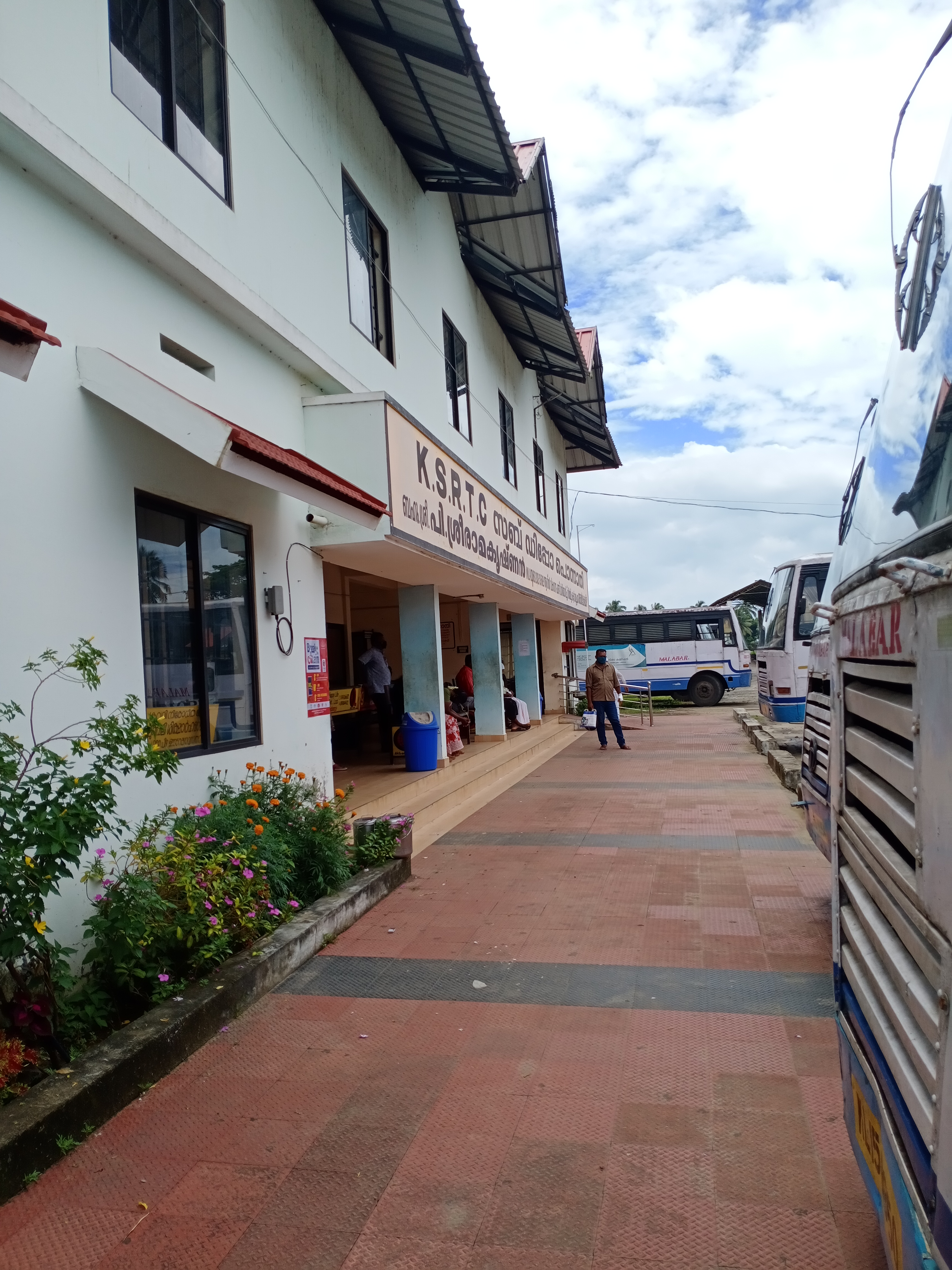
KSRTC Bus Station Ponnani

- Nearest Airports: Karipur (CCJ)
- Nearest Major Railway Station: Kuttippuram and Tirur
- Major bus station: KSRTC Bus Station, Ponnani
