= Sayyid Sanaullah Makti Tangal =

Sanulla Makti Thangal
- Born: Sanulla Makti Thangal; 1847; Veliyankode, Ponnani, Malappuram, British India
- Died: 18 September 1912 (aged 64–65)
- Education: Ponnani Darse ( Arabic College based on Masjids), Chavakkad Higher elementary school
- Known for: Kerala reformation movement
- Title: Renaissance leader
- Parents: Sayyid Ahmed (father); Shareefa Beevi (mother)

Sanulla Makti Thangal (Arabic: سيّد سناء الله مكتي) was the renaissance leader of Muslim society in Malabar of British India and the advocate of western education in Mappila. He was a reformer in Kerala Muslim Society.

== Early life ==
He was born in 1847 born as the son of Ahmed Thangal, follower of Veliyankode Umer khasi at Veliyankode, Malappuram.

== Death ==
He died on 18 September 1912.
