= Vattamkulam =

- town
- Location in Kerala, India Vattamkulam (India)
- Coordinates: 10°47′0″N 76°1′30″E
- Country: India
- State: Kerala
- District: Malappuram

Languages
  - Official: Malayalam, English
- Time zone: UTC+5:30 (IST)
- PIN: 679578
- Telephone code: 0494
- Vehicle registration: KL-10, KL-54
- Nearest city: Edappal
- Lok Sabha constituency: Ponnani

Vattamkulam is a village in Malappuram district of the Indian state of Kerala. Vattamkulam means "Round Pond".

== Geography ==
Vattamkulam is a village located near Edappal, in the fertile valley of the Bharatapuzha/Nila River. The village is also close to numerous hills and mountains. Sukapuram is the nearby village.

== History ==
It was important as a marketing hub for areca nut (kooradakka) in the 1960s. In the 1970s, the once-sleepy village sent most of its able bodied men to the Persian Gulf countries. Almost every family sent one or more men to the Gulf. The name reportedly derives from the "valiya vattamkulam" (Big round pond) located at Chembazha Thazham. The Panchayat was formed in 1962 covering 56 square kilometres and a population of 38,254. Illams abound in this place and the historic Veda Gramam of Sukapuram is there.

The new panchayat building was inaugurated on 22 October 2025 by the Kerala opposition leader V._D._Satheesan. M._P._Abdussamad_Samadani and other luminaries are present.

The land of the panchayat was donated in 1962 by late Mundenkattil Bappu Haji.

== Festivals and religion ==
The Dhakshina Moorthi Temple and Kulankara Devi Temple are situated in Sukapuram. Sukapuram is well known for vedhagramam and yagas.

Kulamkara pooram is a local festival. In 2009 December people came from as far away as Germany. A helicopter ride is offered.

Potturkavu makaram is known for Vanibham (trade festival) and Kaazhcha Varavukal by various villages. Eringikkal pattu mahotsavam is celebrated during Malayalam month Meenam. Bhagawati Pattu.

Kundurummal Masjid is centuries old and has tombstones dating to the British Raj. It has a Madrasa with dozens of students from across Kerala. Neeliyad juma masjid is there. The main Juma Masjid at Vattamkulam center is reputed to be over 150 years old. It has a Madrasa with dozens of students. Its head Ustad Abdul Vadood Nizami has a PhD which is rare among the Ulema.

== Economy ==
The main agriculture activity is rice production, along with areca nut, pepper, banana, etc.

== Landmarks ==
- Darul Hidaya Dawa College
- D.H.O.H.S.S. Pookkarathara
- A.W.H. College, Anakkara
- Kakramkunnu Temple, Anakkara
- Thanvirul Vildan Madrasah
- Malabar Dental College, Chekannur
- Thallu Parambil Bhagavathi Temple, Chekannur
- Thirumaniyoor Mahadeva Keshethram, Kandanakam
- Technical Higher Secondary School, Vattamkulam
- Kundurummal Jum'a Masjid
- Vattamkulam Jum'a Masjid
- Government UP School, Vattamkulam
- Kavupra Shiva God Temple
- Eruvaprakkunnu Ayyappa Temple
- Vattamkulam Panchayat building and allied offices
- Veterinary hospital
- Neeliyad Jum'a Masjid
- CPNUPS VATTAMKULAM
- Kallanikavu Bhagavathi Temple Mudur
- Sree Vivekananda Vidhyanikethan School, Kavupra
- Iqsoft software consultants, Vattamkulam

== Culture ==
The Public library named Grameena Vayanashala holds gatherings and dialogues.

== Transport ==
Vattamkulam connects to other parts of India through Kuttippuram town. National highway No.66 passes through Edappal and connects to Goa and Mumbai. The southern stretch connects to Cochin and Trivandrum. National Highway No.966 connects to Palakkad and Coimbatore. The nearest airport is at Kozhikode. The nearest major railway station is at Kuttippuram.
