= Puthuponnani =

- village
- Interactive map of Puthuponnani
- Coordinates: 10.74°N 75.93°E
- Country: India
- State: Kerala
- District: Malappuram District

Languages
  - Official: Malayalam, English
- Time zone: UTC+5:30 (IST)

Puthuponnani is coastal locality in Ponnani taluk of Malappuram district in the state of Kerala, India.

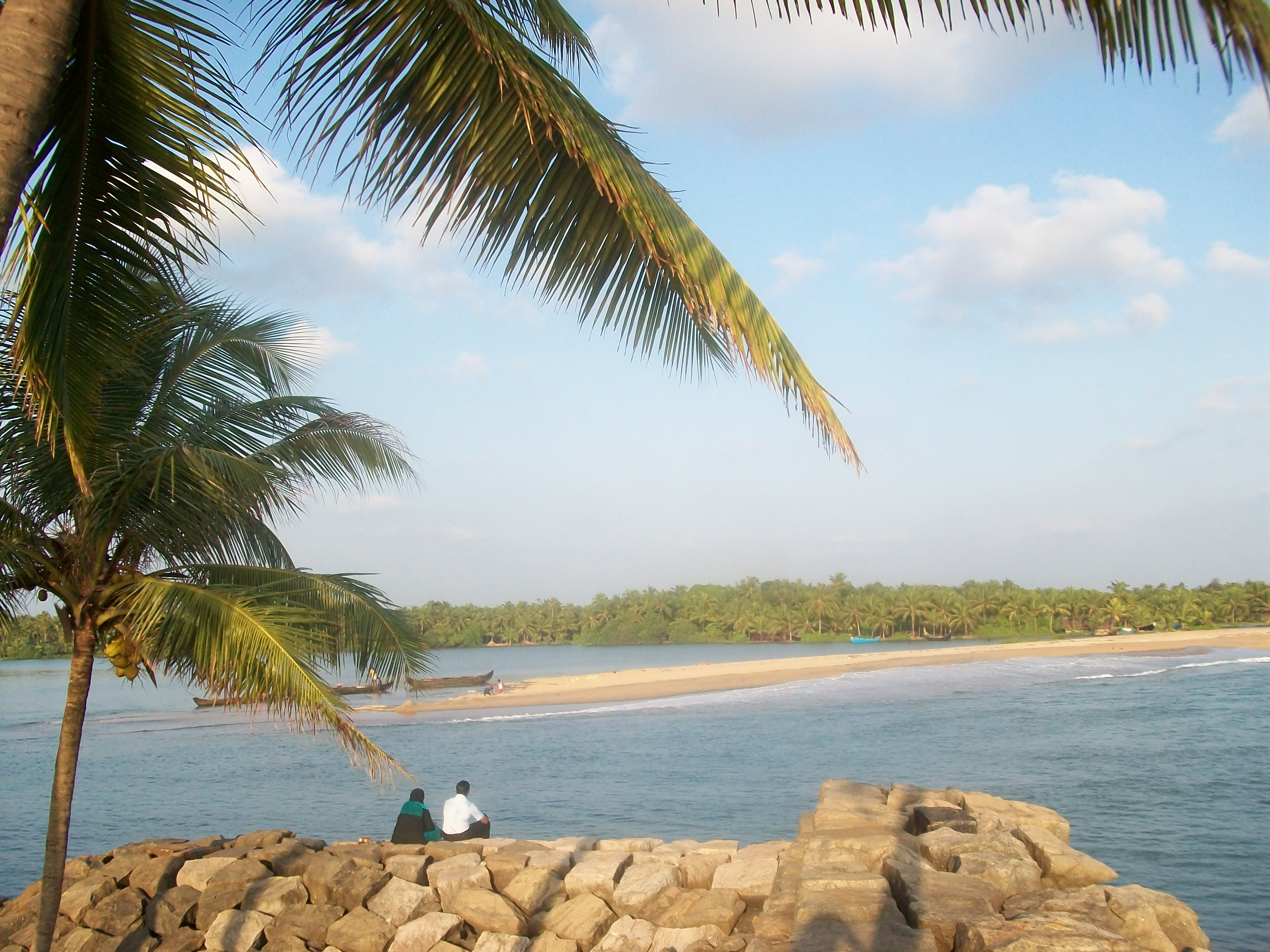
A scene from Puthuponnani promontory

== Description ==
Puthuponnani borders the Arabian Sea to the west and the Canoli Canal to the east. Puthuponnani is administratively under Ponnani municipality. It separates Ponnani municipality from Veliyankode Grama Panchayat.

Puthuponnani's promontory, where the Canoli Canal meets the Arabian Sea, is place for people to relax and enjoy the sunset. Veliyankode is a nearby place.

== Transportation ==
Puthuponnani village connects to other parts of India through Kuttippuram town. National highway No.66 passes through Edappal and the northern stretch connects to Goa and Mumbai. The southern stretch connects to Cochin and Trivandrum. National Highway No.966 connects to Palakkad and Coimbatore. The nearest airport is at Kozhikode. The nearest major railway station is at Kuttippuram.

== Society ==
Socially and economically backward when compared with other parts of the taluk, most people's livelihood is fishing and daily wage labour. Some migrated to Gulf countries. A few people work in the educational (government and private) and conventional agricultural sectors.
