= Kooradakka =

Species of tree

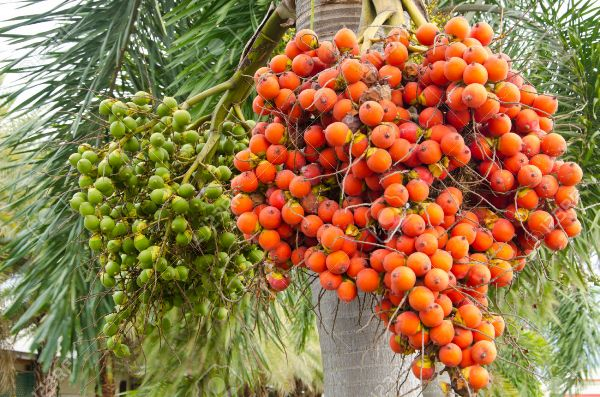
Kamuku (Malayalam)Tree with bunches of fruits

The small variety of areca nut (botanical name Areca catechu) is termed in Malayalam as kooradakka( also known as kotadakka in some places of Kerala). The adakka or kamuku as it is called locally is grown in south India mainly in Kerala, Tamil Nadu, Karnataka and Andhra Pradesh. Vattamkulam village in Malappuram district of Kerala is historically renowned for its special kooradakka. Areca nut is also popularly known as the supari or common chewing nut. It is not a nut but a fruit. It is the hard round seed which is used for chewing. A medium-sized straight unbranched tree produces three to ten bunches of fruits which change colour to orange when ripe. The husk is discarded and the nut is cleaned and used. The nut is endowed with medicinal properties and is recommended in Ayurveda for a variety of ailments. . Varieties of Arecanut are Subamangala, Mangala, Sumangala, Mohitnagar, Hirehalli dwarf, Samruthi (Andaman), VTLAH 1, 2, Thirthahalli dwarf and Srimangala are the main commercial varieties cultivated in India.
