= Maranchery =

- Census town
- Map of Maranchery
- Interactive map of Maranchery
- Coordinates: 10°44′18″N 75°58′25″E
- Country: India
- State: Kerala
- District: Malappuram
- Elevation: 0 m (0 ft)

Population (2011)
  - Total: 35,011

Languages
  - Official: Malayalam, English
- Time zone: UTC+5:30 (IST)
- PIN: 679581
- Vehicle registration: KL-54
- Website: www.maranchery.com

Kandal Forest, Biyyam Kayal

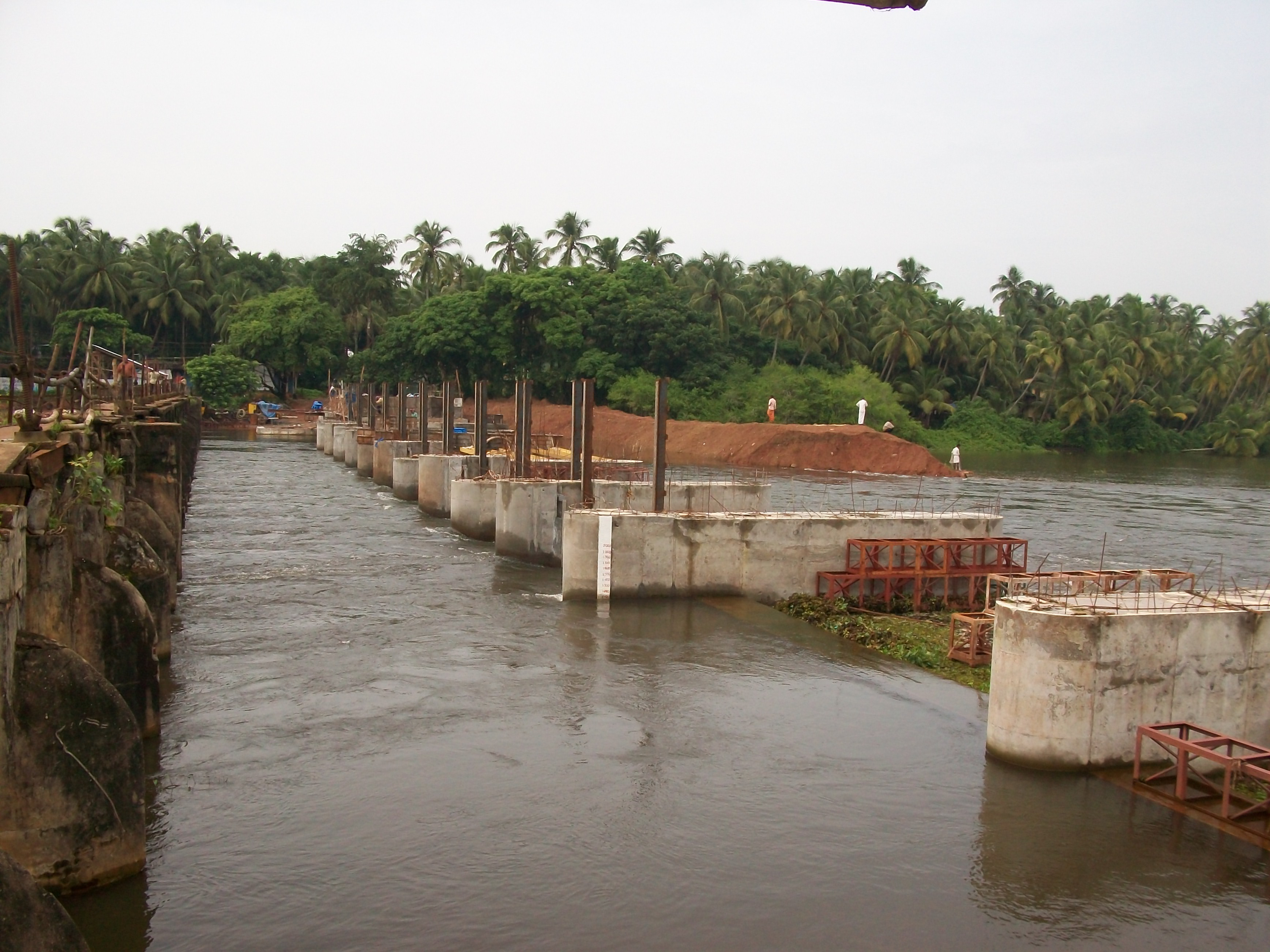
Biyyam Kaayal

Maranchery is a census town within the circle of Ponnani taluk, Malappuram district, in the Indian state of Kerala.

== Geography ==
This village is surrounded by the Biyyam Kaayal, a backwater associated with the Naranipuzha River on one side and Veliankode village on the other. As of the 2001 provisional statistics, Maranchery has a geographic area of 20.47 km². Kundukadavu, Purangu, Thamalassery, Maradi, Vadamukku, Panambadu, Parichakam, and Mukkala are village areas under the Maranchery Panchayat.

== History ==
Maranchery was formerly home of the Azhvanchery Thamprakkal, now located in Athavanadu.

== Notables ==
- E. Moidu Moulavi, Indian freedom fighter.
- TV Anupama IAS

== Economy ==
It is a popular commercial center for Thaneer Panthal and Maranchery Chanda.

== Politics ==
Marakkarakayil Moidutty (koolath) was the first president of Maranchery Panchayat.

== Demographics ==
As per the 2011 India census report, Maranchery had a population of 35,011 with 16,041 males and 18,970 females.

== Culture ==
Maranchery's culture is heavily influenced by Muslim traditions, reflecting its Muslim majority. Duff Muttu, Kolkali and Aravanamuttu are popular folk/cultural arts. Kodanchery Juma Masjid is the oldest mosque, and is the main landmark of Maranchery. Many libraries are nearby the mosque. Most books are in Arabi-Malayalam, a version of the Malayalam language written in Arabic script. People gather in mosques for evening prayer followed by discussion of social and cultural issues. Business and family issues get sorted during the after-prayer meetings in the evening. The Hindu minority follow their traditions by celebrating various festivals. Hindu rituals are regularly performed in Maranchary as in other parts of Kerala. The Siva temple at Maranchery village has a separate history that dates back several centuries.

== Transport ==
Maranchery is served by Kuttipuram (nearest) or Guruvayur railway stations.

The nearest airport is at Karipur (80 km). Cochin International Airport (94 km) is also available.

The state highway crosses through Maranchery, allowing for comfortable road transportation.

The village of Maranchery connects to other parts of India through Kuttippuram. National Highway No.66 passes through Edappal, connecting to Goa and Mumbai in the north and Cochin and Trivandrum in the south. National Highway No.966 connects to Palakkad and Coimbatore. State highway No.62, which connects Guruvayur and Ponnani, passes through Maranchery.

== Administration ==
Divided into 19 wards, Maranchery is administrated by gram panchayat, which is led by the gram panchayat president.

== Wards in Maranchery Gram Panchayat ==
Wards
Ward Number	Name	Reservation Category	Member Details
1	KANJIRAMUKKU WEST	Woman	https://lsgkerala.gov.in/en/lbelection/electdmemberpersondet/2020/990/2020099000101
2	KANJIRAMUKKU EAST	Woman	https://lsgkerala.gov.in/en/lbelection/electdmemberpersondet/2020/990/2020099000201
3	KARINGALLATHANI	General	https://lsgkerala.gov.in/en/lbelection/electdmemberpersondet/2020/990/2020099000301
4	KARAKKAD	Woman	https://lsgkerala.gov.in/en/lbelection/electdmemberpersondet/2020/990/2020099000401
5	PANAMPAD	General	https://lsgkerala.gov.in/en/lbelection/electdmemberpersondet/2020/990/2020099000501
6	VADAMUKKU	SC	https://lsgkerala.gov.in/en/lbelection/electdmemberpersondet/2020/990/2020099000601
7	ADHIKARIPPADI	Woman	https://lsgkerala.gov.in/en/lbelection/electdmemberpersondet/2020/990/2020099000701
8	THURUVANAM	Woman	https://lsgkerala.gov.in/en/lbelection/electdmemberpersondet/2020/990/2020099000801
9	THAMALASSERY	Woman	https://lsgkerala.gov.in/en/lbelection/electdmemberpersondet/2020/990/2020099000901
10	MARANCHERY CENTER	Woman	https://lsgkerala.gov.in/en/lbelection/electdmemberpersondet/2020/990/2020099001001
11	PARICHAKAM SOUTH	Woman	https://lsgkerala.gov.in/en/lbelection/electdmemberpersondet/2020/990/2020099001101
12	PARICHAKAM NORTH	General	https://lsgkerala.gov.in/en/lbelection/electdmemberpersondet/2020/990/2020099001201
13	MUKKALA	General	https://lsgkerala.gov.in/en/lbelection/electdmemberpersondet/2020/990/2020099001301
14	PANAMPAD WEST	Woman	https://lsgkerala.gov.in/en/lbelection/electdmemberpersondet/2020/990/2020099001401
15	AVUNDITHARA	Woman	https://lsgkerala.gov.in/en/lbelection/electdmemberpersondet/2020/990/2020099001501
16	PURANGU	General	https://lsgkerala.gov.in/en/lbelection/electdmemberpersondet/2020/990/2020099001601
17	PADINJATTUMURI	General	https://lsgkerala.gov.in/en/lbelection/electdmemberpersondet/2020/990/2020099001701
18	AVENKOTTA	General	https://lsgkerala.gov.in/en/lbelection/electdmemberpersondet/2020/990/2020099001801
19	KUNDUKADAVU	General	https://lsgkerala.gov.in/en/lbelection/electdmemberpersondet/2020/990/2020099001901

== Amenities ==
Sun Set, Maranchery

Biyyam Kayal offers a placid, green-fringed backwater with a watersports facility. A boat race is conducted annually, especially during the Onam celebration. A permanent pavilion is available for spectators, and the lake hosts nearly two dozen country boats. Both men and women participate in the race.

During the monsoon, paddy fields are filled with water for four to six months. Many migratory birds and small creatures frequent them. These waterlogged paddy fields are called Kole lands in Kerala.

Kaakka Thuruthu (Crow Island) is a small island. It is a seasonal home for migratory birds. By the end of October, birds arrive. Some range to Siberia and Europe and from Himalayan regions, while some of the resident species come from Tamil Nadu and Karnataka. During April, they start departing. The best time for bird watching is between June and August. Forr migratory birds, the best time is November to February.

SEED Global School is situated at maranchery.

Maradi Padam is a good place for sightseeing..
