= Kalady, Malappuram =

Kalady is a census town near Edappal in Kalady Grama Panjayath, Ponnani Taluk, Malappuram district, Kerala

== Transportation ==
Kalady village connects to other parts of India through Kuttippuram town. National highway No.66 passes through Edappal and the northern stretch connects to Goa and Mumbai. The southern stretch connects to Cochin and Trivandrum. National Highway No.966 connects to Palakkad and Coimbatore. The nearest airport is at Kozhikode. The nearest major railway station is at Kuttippuram.
