= Alamcode, Malappuram =

Alamcode
- village
- Location in Kerala, India Alamcode (India)
- Coordinates: 10.7328800°N 76.029650°E
- Country: India
- State: Kerala
- District: Malappuram

Government
  - Type: Local Administration
  - Body: Gram panchayat

Population (2011)
  - Total: 33,918

Languages
  - Official: Malayalam, English
- Time zone: UTC+5:30 (IST)
- PIN: 679591
- Vehicle registration: KL-53

Alamcode , also Alamkod, is a village in Malappuram district in the state of Kerala, India.

== Demographics ==
At the 2011 India census, Alamcode had a population of 33,918 with 15,798 males and 18,120 females. Alamcode panchayat is situated near the border of Trissur, Malappuram and Palakkad. The Changaramkulam police station is located in Alamcode panchayat. The village of Kakkidippuram is within the panchayat, to the east.

== Transportation ==
Alamkod village connects to other parts of India through National Highway 66 at Kuttippuram and the northern stretch connects to Goa and Mumbai. The southern stretch connects to Cochin and Trivandrum. National Highway 966 connects to Palakkad and Coimbatore. The nearest airport is at Kozhikode. The nearest major railway station is at Kuttippuram.
