= Changaramkulam =

- Town
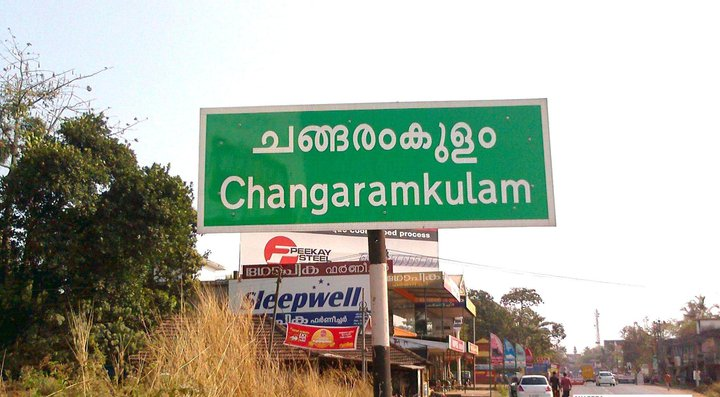
- A location board located in Changaramkulam

- Location in Kerala, India Changaramkulam (India)
- Coordinates: 10°44′06″N 76°01′45″E
- Country: India
- State: Kerala
- District: Malappuram

Languages
  - Official: Malayalam, English
- Time zone: UTC+5:30 (IST)
- PIN: 679575
- Telephone code: 0494
- Vehicle registration: KL10 (Malappuram) and KL54 (Ponnani)
- Nearest city: Edappal
- Lok Sabha constituency: Ponnani
- Climate: Am (Köppen)

Changaramkulam (Malayalam: ചങ്ങരംകുളം) (IAST: Caṅṅaraṅkuḷaṁ) is a town in Ponnani Taluk in the Malappuram district in the State of Kerala, India. It falls under the Nannamukku and Alamcode panchayats.

== Economy ==
Changaramkulam has public markets, such as weekly cattle markets, areca nut markets, and various food markets. Changaramkulam is located in the southern part of the Malappuram district. The Kerala State Highway 69 (Thrissur Kuttipuram Road) passes through Changaramkulam.

== Education ==
- Assabah Arabic College - Pavittappuram
- Assabah Arts & Science College - Valayamkulam
- Darul Ihsan Islamic & Arts College, Punnakkal - Changaramkulam
- Darussalam-Changaramkulam
- Lesson Lens Global School - Valayamkulam
- Markazu Thazkiyyathi Sunniyya Upper Primary School - Aynichod
- MVM Residential Higher Secondary School - Valayamkulam
- Pakaravoor Chithran Nampoothiripad Government Higher Secondary School - Mookkuthala
- Nannamukku Technical High School - Kokkur
- S M Vanitha College - Changaramkulam

== Transportation ==
Changaramkulam is located in the southern part of the Malappuram district, about 5 km from both the Thrissur and Palakkad districts. The Kerala State Highway 69 (Thrissur–Kuttippuram Road) passes through Changaramkulam, connecting it to other parts of India through the National Highway 66 at Kuttippuram; Goa and Mumbai in the north and Cochin and Trivandrum in the south. National Highway 966 connects to Palakkad and Coimbatore. The nearest airports are Kozhikode International Airport and Cochin International Airport. The nearest major railway stations are Kuttippuram and Guruvayoor.

== Temple ==
Kannenkav Bhagavathi Temple Mookkuthala Sree Karekkad Bhagavathi Temple Perumukku
