= Sukapuram =

Village in Kerala, India

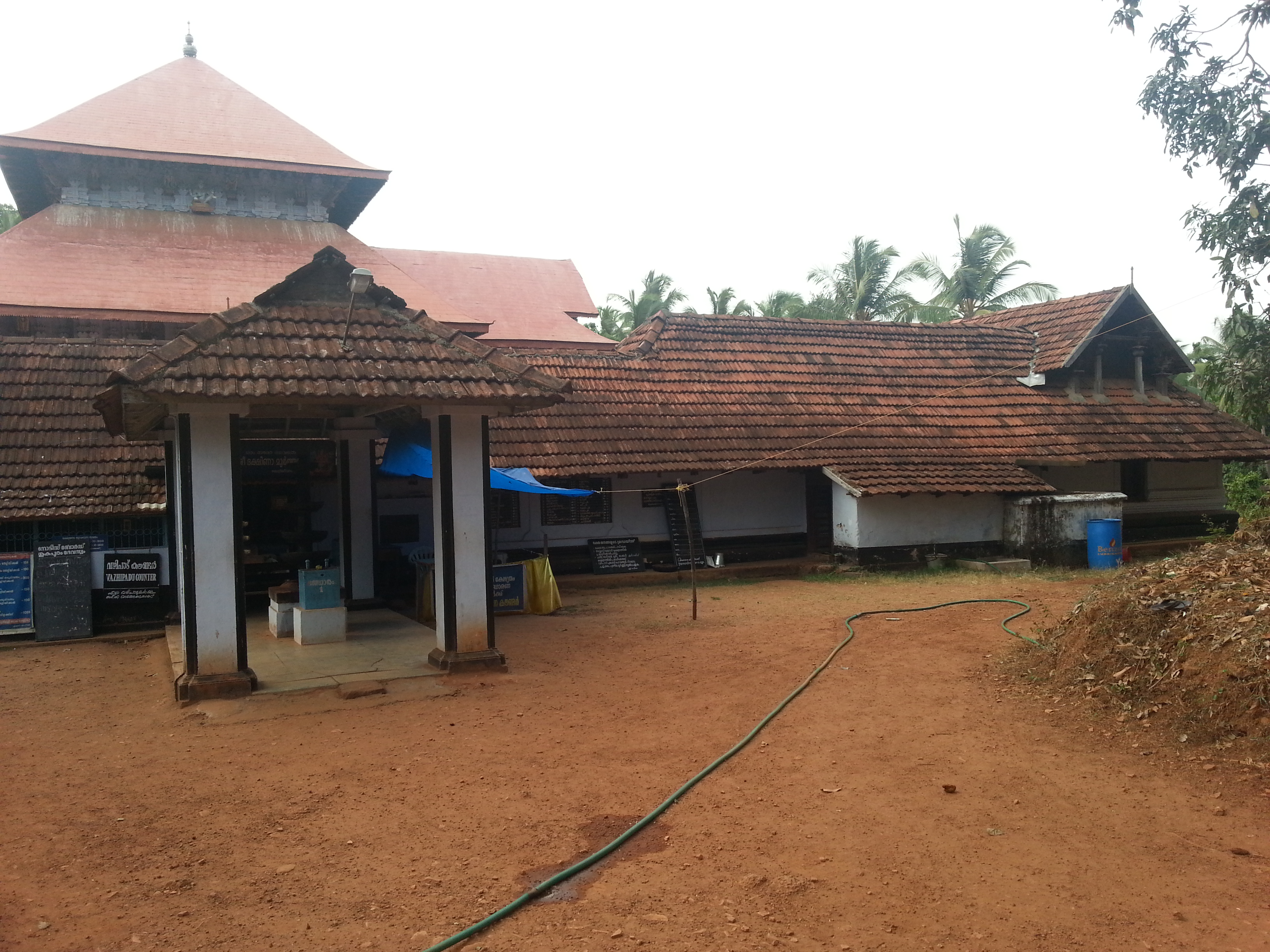
Dakshinamurthy (Siva) Temple

Shukapuram, colloquially Chokiram, is a village in Ponnani taluk, Malappuram district of Kerala. It is located near Edappal, on the plains south of the Bharathappuzha. The village is one of the earliest Brahmin settlements ("Sukapuram gramam") in Kerala.

Sukapuram is famous for its Dakshinamurthy Shiva Temple. It is believed to have been established by the Vedic rishi Shuka. Siva as Dakshinamurthy is the principal deity of the temple, with his consort Parvathy and son Ganapathy. The Grade-B temple is administrated by an executive officer under Malabar Devaswom Board (Malappuram Division).

== Historical records in the temple ==
From Index to Cera Inscriptions, M. G. S. Narayanan (1996)

- C17 (10th century CE) - eastern side of courtyard in temple - single stone slab writing (22 lines, incomplete) on one side (Vattezhuthu with Grantha, Old Malayalam)
- C18 (10th century CE) - base of the second pillar of Vathilmadam in temple - single block of granite with writing (19 lines, damaged) on four sides (Vattezhuthu with Grantha, Old Malayalam)
- C19 (10th century CE) - base of the first pillar of Vathilamdam in temple - single block of granite with writing (15 lines) on four sides (Vattezhuthu with Grantha, Old Malayalam)
- C20 (close of the 9th century or the beginning of the 10th century CE) - stone built into the pavement of the courtyard in temple - single stone slab with writing (17 lines, incomplete) on side (Vattezhuthu with Grantha, Old Malayalam)

Renovations and restorations

An agreement was signed between Kerala Infrastructure Investment Fund Board (KIIFB) and Devaswom Board for setting transit camp complexes (edathavaloms) for Sabarimala pilgrims in several Kerala temples, including Sukapuram, in 2018. The temple is expected to receive Rs. 10 crore from KIIFB to set up edathavaloms in one and a half year. Travancore Devaswom Board is expected to manage the KIIFB funded work. There were also calls from the temple officials to spend some amount of the funding to restore the medieval carvings in the srikovil of the temple.

The temple is expected to receive an additional 8 crores for renovation and restoration. This include funding from Archaeology Department and Government of Kerala (Tourism Circuit).

The festival in the month of January with caparisoned elephants and percussion is famous in the region.

== Transportation ==
Sukapuram village connects to other parts of Kerala through Edappal.

State Highway 69 passes through Edappal.

- Nearest airport - Kozhikode.
- Nearest major railway station- Kuttippuram
