= Edappal =

- Census Town
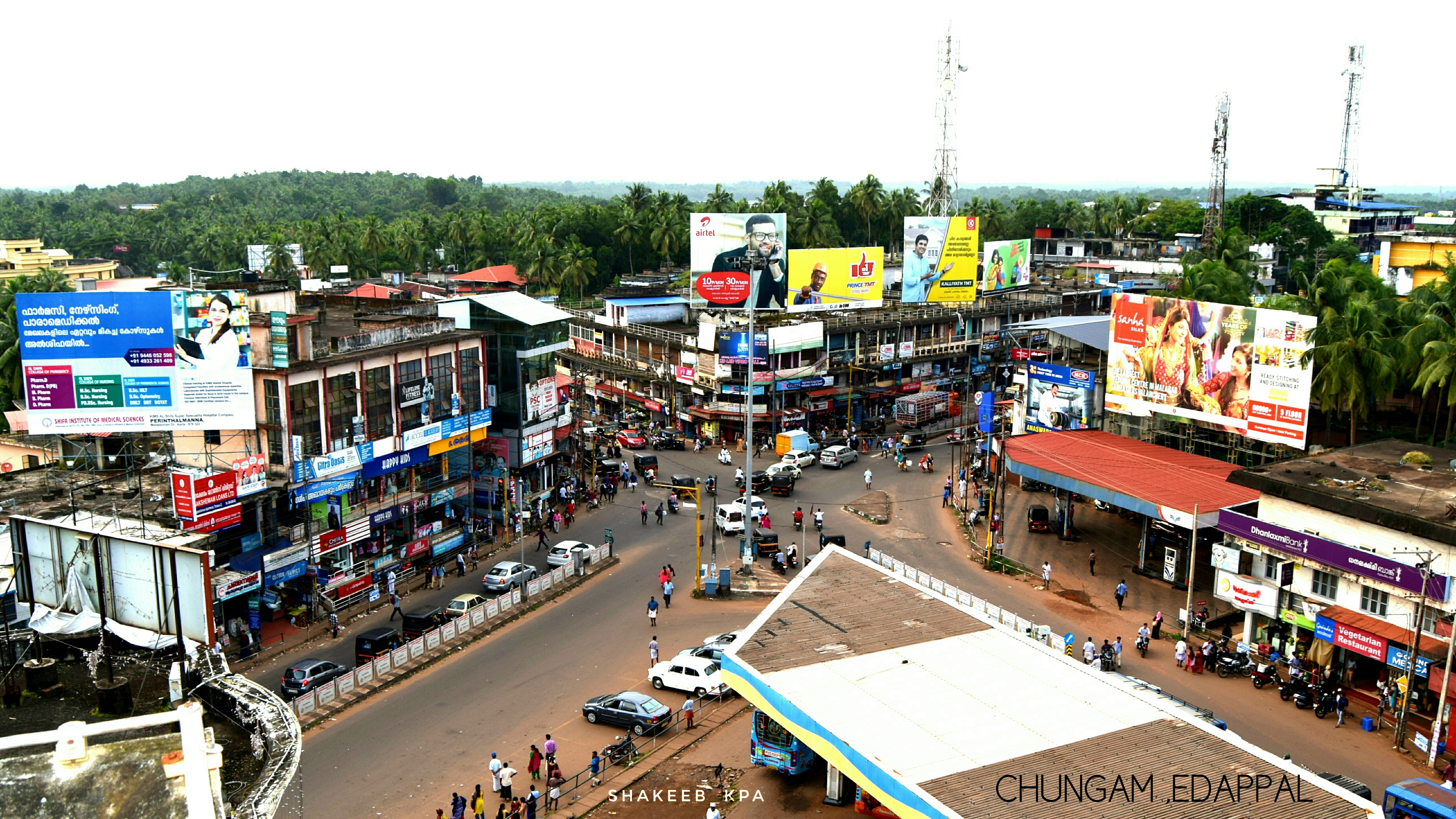
- Edappal town

- Location in Kerala, India Edappal (India)
- Coordinates: 10.7837°N 76.0076°E
- Country: India
- State: Kerala
- District: Malappuram

Area
  - Total: 22.2 km^{2} (8.6 sq mi)

Population (2011)
  - Total: 32,550
  - Density: 1,470/km^{2} (3,800/sq mi)

Languages
  - Official: Malayalam, English
- Time zone: UTC+5:30 (IST)
- PIN: 679576
- Telephone code: 0494
- Vehicle registration: KL-54

Edappal is a town which lies near to the town of Ponnani in Ponnani taluk, Malappuram district, Kerala, India. Edappal at the junction of Thrissur-Kuttippuram and Palakkad-Ponnani state highways, is located 45 km (28 mi) from Malappuram. Edappal lies in two panchayaths (local body jursidcitions), Vattamkulam, and Edappal. Edappal shares borders with Thuyyam, Polpakkara, Ayilakkadu, Vattamkulam, and Annakampadu. Sukapuram (also known as Chowwara), one of the earliest Brahmin settlements in Kerala, lies in Edappal. The Azhvanchery Thamprakkal of Athavanad (originally Maranchery), had influence over the Nambudiris of Sukapuram (Chowwara), while the Kalpakanchery Thamprakkal of Kalpakanchery influenced the rival Nambudiris of Panniyoor. Edappal forms a portion of the Malappuram metropolitan area as of 2011 Census. Edappal lies in Ponnani Kole Wetlands and is surrounded by the Biyyam backwater lake of Ponnani.

== Notable people ==
- Artist Namboothiri
- Sukumaran (Actor)
- Akkitham Achuthan Namboothiri
- P.P. Ramachandran
- Chekannur Maulavi
- Edasseri Govindan Nair
- Devdutt Padikkal (Cricketer)
- P Surendran(Writer)
