= Aster Guardians Global Nursing Award =

International award for nursing

- Type: International nursing award
- Awarded for: "To recognise the phenomenal contribution of nurses to humanity".
- Presented by: Aster DM Healthcare
- Reward: US$250,000
- Established: 2021
- First award: 2022

Highlights
- Total: 1
- Total recipients: 1
- Related: Aster DM Healthcare

The Aster Guardians Global Nursing Award is an international award that recognizes nurses who are deemed to have made exceptional contributions to the field of nursing, and the medical field in general.

== History ==
The award was first announced on International Nurses Day in 2021, with the first awards ceremony scheduled for May 12, 2022. According to Aster DM Healthcare founder Azad Moopen, the global shortage of nurses was one of the motivating factors for the creation of the prize.

The first award was granted to Anna Qabale Duba, a Kenyan nurse who was recognized for her community work on behalf of girls education and against female genital mutilation and early marriage. After winning the prize, Duba used the prize money to construct a school in Kenya.

World Health Organization director Dr. Tedros Adhanom Ghebreyesus appeared at the inauguration of the award and spoke on the importance of recognizing nurses.

The 10 finalists for the 2023 competition were selected from 52,000 entries from 202 countries, and included nurses from Ireland, Panama, Singapore, Kenya, England, the Philippines, Portugal, Tanzania, and the United Arab Emirates.

The 2023 award ceremony took place in London, England. The award went to Margaret Shepherd, a nurse from England, for her work with genetic diabetes. Shepherd established a national network of genetic diabetes nurses to raise awareness about genetic diabetes, a condition with a high rate of misdiagnosis.

== Selection process ==
The award is open to professional nurses worldwide, who either apply themselves or are nominated by others. The initial pool of candidates is screened by Ernst & Young, who narrow the list according to quality standards. Candidates are nominated according to their contributions in five areas; patient care, nursing leadership, nursing education, social or community service, and research or innovation.

A grand jury then selects 10 finalists from the shortlisted candidates. The 10 finalists then participate in a panel discussion with the grand jury, and the winner is chosen by means of a public vote. Winners of the 2022 selection process were chosen from approximately 24,000 nurses.

== Award description ==
The main award is a trophy bearing the emblem of the award. The 9 other finalists receive honorary plaques. The winner of the award receives a cash prize of $250,000 US dollars, while the nine other finalists receive a prize of $5,000 each.

== See also ==
- Healthcare in the United Arab Emirates
- Health in the United Arab Emirates
