= Aster Medcity =

- Aster DM Healthcare
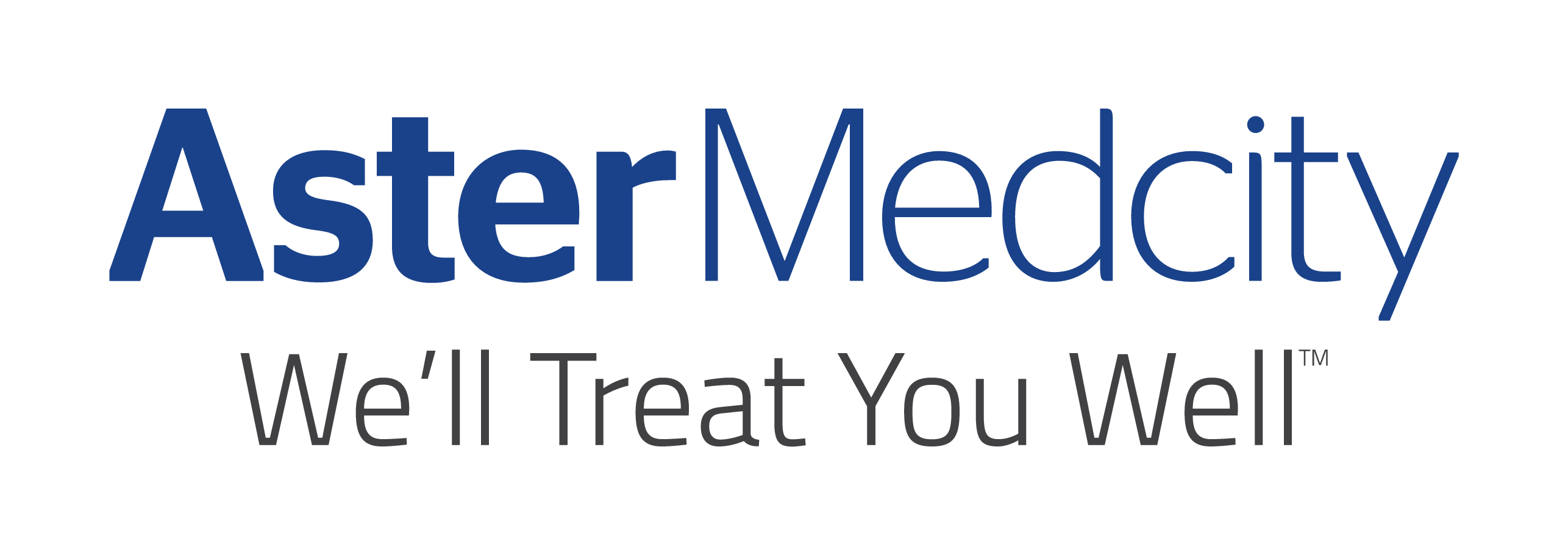

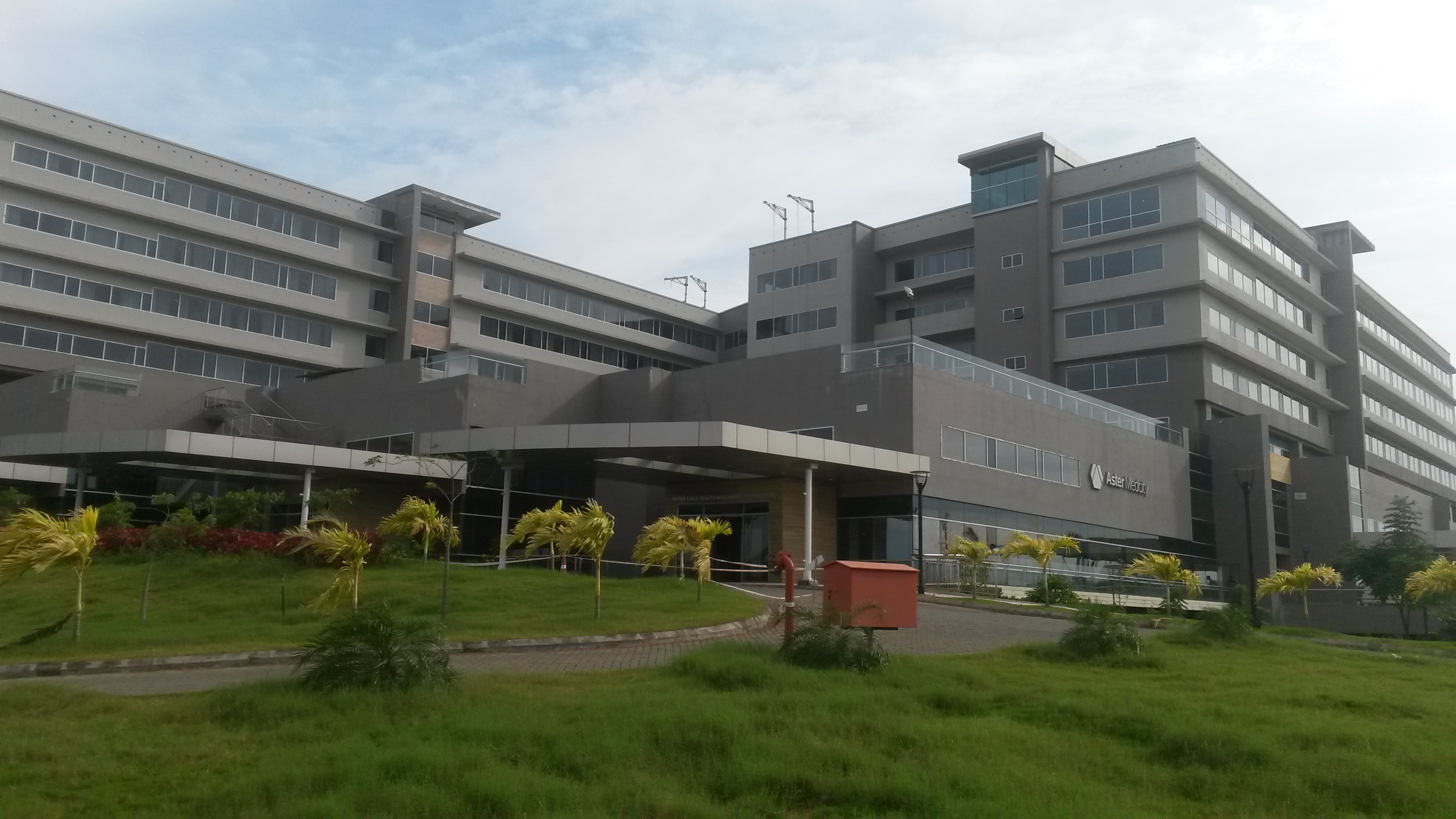
- Hospital complex

Geography
- Location: Cheranallur, Kochi, Kerala, India
- Coordinates: 10°02′36″N 76°16′41″E

Organisation
- Care system: Quaternary

Services
- Emergency department: Yes
- Beds: 800

History
- Founded: 6 May 2015

Links
- Website: Official Website
- Lists: Hospitals in India

Aster Medcity is a quaternary care healthcare centre in the city of Kochi and one of the largest in South India. It is the flagship hospital of Aster DM Healthcare, a healthcare conglomerate founded by Azad Moopen. This was the third venture of the group in Kerala, after Aster MIMS and DM Wayanad Institute of Medical Sciences (DMWIMS).

== Overview ==
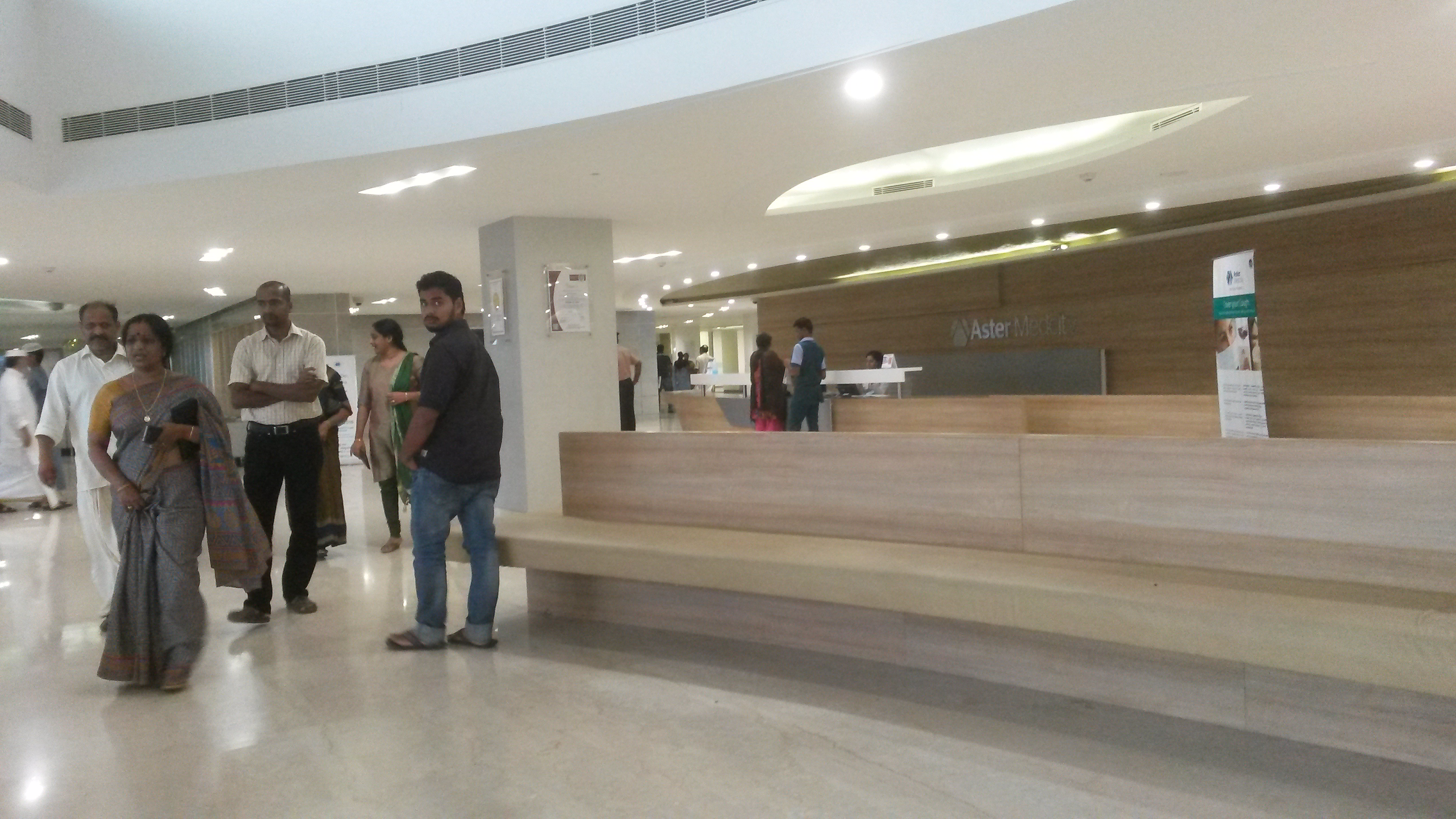
Main Reception

Aster Medcityis a ₹ 5.5 billion waterfront facility located along Kutti Sahib Road in Cheranallur, a suburb of Kochi and its 40-acre campus is situated on the banks of the backwaters of Kochi. The hospital complex, designed by HKS Architects, has a built up space measuring a total of 62,710 square metres. The hospital is 7 km from the city center and is accessible through the National Highway 66 (India). Edappally railway station is 7.3 km away and the nearest airport is Kochi International Airport, 24.7 km from the hospital by road. The distance to the National Highway 544 is 7.9 km at Edappally bye-pass junction where Lulu Mall, the largest shopping mall in the country, is located.

The hospital has an in-patient capacity of 800 beds and has 24 hour emergency and accident trauma care facilities. The hospital has been functioning since September 2014 after a soft launch but the official dedication ceremony was on 6 May 2015, when the institution was inaugurated by the former president of India, A. P. J. Abdul Kalam.

== Facilities ==
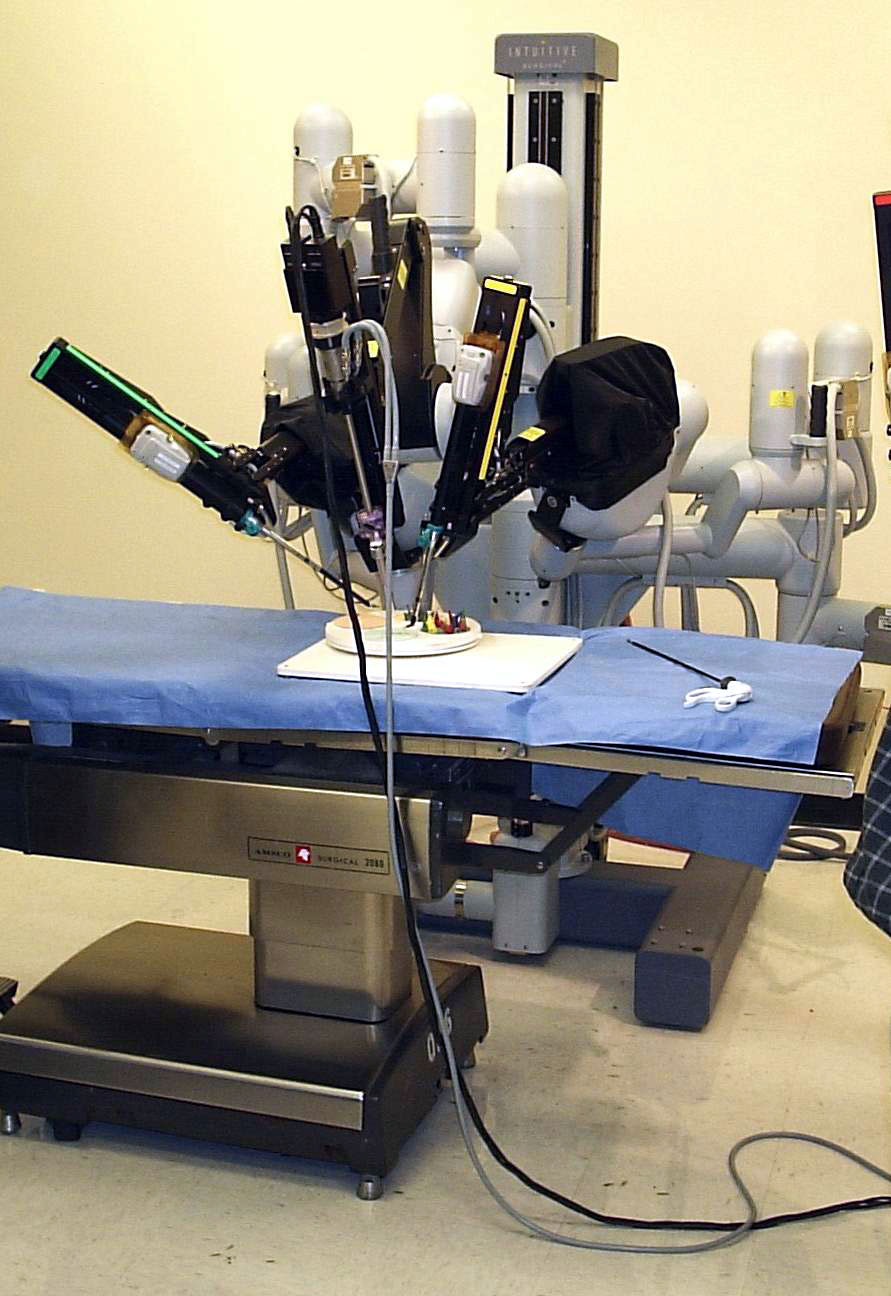
da Vinci Surgical System.

The hospital has a general clinical division which includes internal medicine, general surgery, cilinical imaging, anesthesia and critical care, emergency, pulmonology, otorhynolaryngology, dermatology, craniomaxillofacial surgery, dental sciences, infectious diseases and infection control, psychiatry and nuclear medicine. It also has eight centres of excellence such as cardiac sciences, orthopedics, neurosciences, nephrology and urology, oncology, gastroenterology and hepatology, women's health and child and adolescent health, each staffed by independent medical teams composed of specialists, nursing and ancillary staff and technicians.

Aster Medcity has facility for Minimal Access Robotic Surgery (MARS) using da Vinci Surgical System and is reported to be the first hospital in Kerala to provide the service. The system employs telesurgical master-slave robotic system and the surgery is carried out using robotic arms instead of human hands. The Diagnostics division is equipped with 3 Tesla Digital MRI Scanner, 256 slice CT Scanner, Digital Mammography system, The Dexa, Digital X-Ray, Time of Flight PET CT, Cath Lab Allura Clarity system, Flat panel Bi-plane Hybrid Cath Lab, Colour Doppler Systems electronic 4D Imaging and Ultrasound Machines with multi modal image fusion. The clinical laboratory which conducts biochemistry, haematology, bacteriology, mycology, BS Level 3 tuberculosis, serology, immunology, histopathology, neuropathology, renal pathology, pulmonary pathology, haematopathology, bone pathology and onco pathology tests, is integrated with the hospital information system. The hospital has an ambulance service, a pharmacy and a rehabilitation centre. A blood bank is also operational round the clock in the hospital.

== Other services ==
Aster Medcity is linked to Aster Foundation, an independent charitable non governmental organization, engaged in providing free medical assistance to financially compromised patients. The hospital serves as a referral healthcare centre for patients from the Persian Gulf region. The group has opened help desks in Qatar and Oman for this purpose.

== See also ==
- Malabar Institute of Medical Sciences
- Aster DM Healthcare
- Asterlabs
