= Tirur-Nilambur metro =

Rapid transit system proposed for Malappuram metropolitan area, Kerala India

Tirur–Nilambur Metro Malappuram Metro

Overview
- Area served: Malappuram metropolitan area
- Locale: Malappuram, Kerala
- Transit type: Rapid transit
- Number of lines: 3
- Line number: Phase-1 * Line 1 (Tirur-Malappuram) 38km Phase-2 * Line 2 (BP Angadi -Ponnani) 16km Phase-3 * Line 3 (Manjeri-Nilambur) 26km
- Chief executive: Malappuram Metro Rail Limited
- Headquarters: Malappuram metropolitan area

Operation
- Began operation: Proposed
- Operation will start: TBD
- Train length: 3 coaches

Technical
- Top speed: 60 km/h (37 mph)

Tirur–Nilambur Metro or Malappuram Metro is a proposed rapid transit system for Malappuram metropolitan area, in India. In 2024, The Malappuram District Body has also examined the feasibility of implementing a metro rail project for the Malappuram metropolitan area and its suburbs. Tirur Constituency Legislator Kurukkoli Moideen has submitted an initial report on a detailed feasibility study on the feasibility of implementing the project and presented a motion in the Kerala Assembly for this purpose. This was first proposed in 2012 and then in 2025.

== History ==
=== Tirur-Nilambur metro ===
In 2017, Licensed Engineers & Supervisors Federation-LENSFED proposed the Tirur-Nilambur Metro Line. The project report was submitted to the government and elected representatives. The project is planned to be constructed in multiple phases from Tirur to Ponnani and from Tirur to Nilambur. The total length of the route is 80 km. Most of the route is planned to be built on elevated rail tracks above the roads. In 2025, Tirur-Nilambur metro proposal for a metro line between Tirur and Nilambur in Malappuram was presented in the assembly in 2025. Kurukkoli Moideen of the Indian Union Muslim League raised the demand through a focus group resolution. Kurukoli opined that a metro-style railway line in the densely populated Malappuram district would help save travel distance, cost and time.

=== Malappuram Metro Rail ===
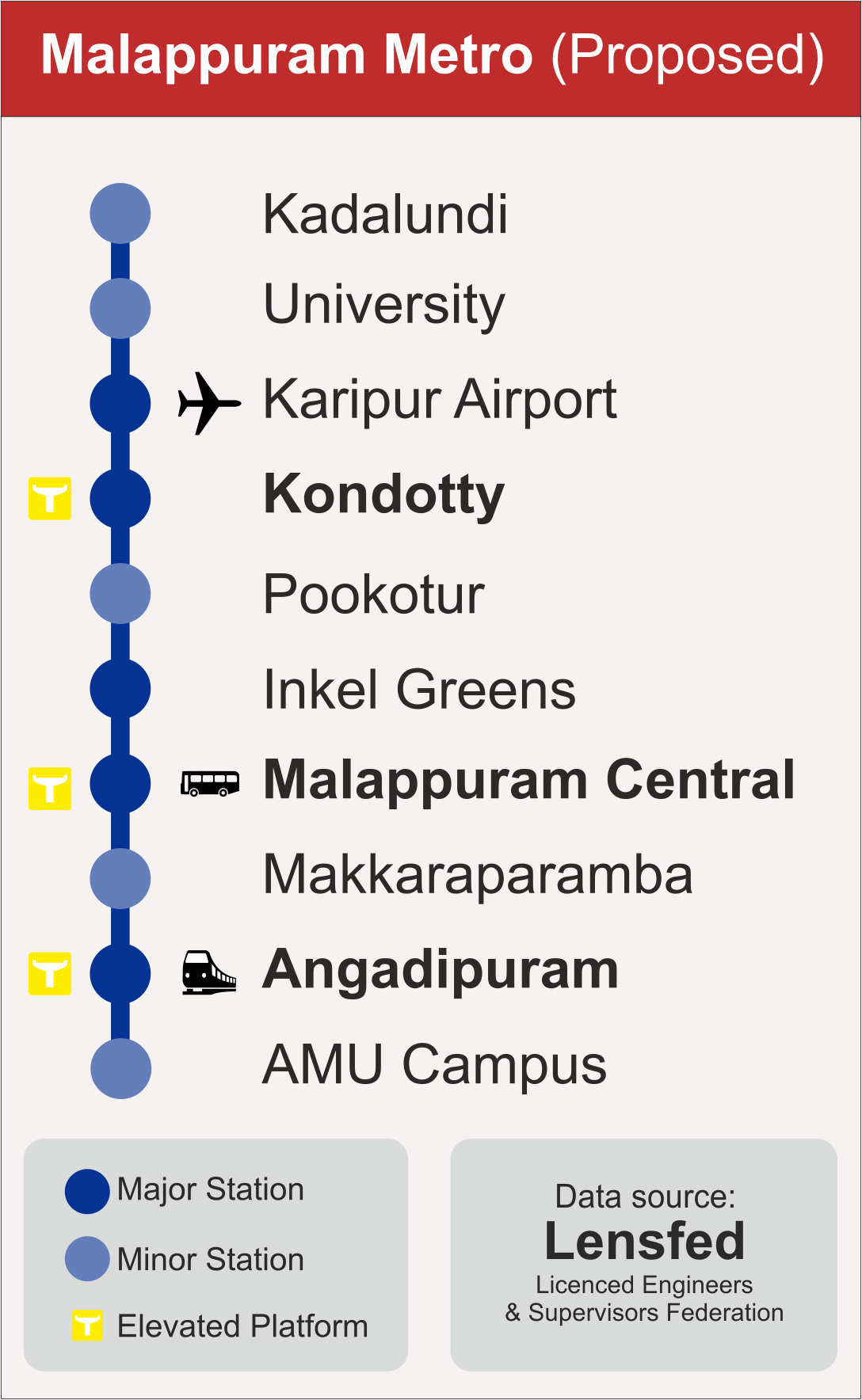
Proposed Malappuram Metro Rail route.

In 2012, Malappuram Metro Rail is a proposed mass transit system for the city by Lensfed (Licensed Engineers & Supervisors Federation). The proposal was considering the future urban scenario which would demand a transport system that can cater to the million plus population of the Malappuram urban agglomeration. In April 2012, Lensfed submitted detailed project report to Government which proposed 8 major stations and 9 intermediate stations out of which three elevated stations at Malappuram Central, Kondotty and Angadipuram. The alignment is similar to the proposed railway line of Calicut-Malappuram-Angadipuram. Apart from this, there is a proposal to extend proposed Kozhikode Light Metro Rail network to Malappuram during its third phase of expansion, paving a way to Calicut-Malappuram 'Urban Corridor' concept

== See also ==
- Malappuram metropolitan area
- Malappuram
- Kochi Metro
- Kozhikode Light Metro
- Urban rail transit in India
