= Aster DM Healthcare =

Healthcare company in Gulf countries and India

Aster DM Quality Care Limited
- Aster DM Healthcare
- Formerly: Dr. Moopen's Clinic
- Type: Public
- Traded as: BSE: 540975; NSE: ASTERDM
- ISIN: INE914M01019
- Industry: Healthcare
- Founder: Azad Moopen
- Headquarters: Bengaluru, India
- Area served: Worldwide
- Products: Hospitals, Pharmacy, Diagnostic centres
- Revenue: ▲₹4,138 crore (US$430 million) (FY25)
- Operating income: ▲₹1,565 crore (US$160 million) (FY23)
- Net income: ▲₹5,407 crore (US$560 million) (FY25)
- Total assets: US$3.81 billion (2023)
- Owner: Moopen family (41.88%)
- Number of employees: 32,400 (2022)
- Subsidiaries: Aster Medcity; Aster Pharmacy; Aster Labs; Dr. Moopen's Medical College
- Website: asterdmhealthcare.in

Aster DM Healthcare Limited is an Indian healthcare company founded by Azad Moopen in 1987. The company is registered in Bengaluru, which became the headquarters for its India operations following the separation of its Gulf Cooperation Council (GCC) business in 2024. Aster operates a network of hospitals, clinics, pharmacies, and diagnostic centres across several Indian states.

== History ==
Aster DM Healthcare was established by Azad Moopen in 1987 as a single-doctor clinic. The organisation gradually expanded through hospitals, clinics, pharmacies, diagnostics, and training institutions. Its formal presence in India began in 2001 with the Malabar Institute of Medical Sciences (MIMS) in Kozhikode, Kerala, which was later integrated into the Aster network.

In 2014, the company opened Aster Medcity in Kochi. In 2016, it acquired Kavery Medical Institute in Bengaluru, redeveloping it as Aster CMI Hospital. The same year, it took over the DM Wayanad Institute of Medical Sciences and acquired a majority stake in Dr. Ramesh Hospitals in Andhra Pradesh. In 2018, Aster added Sangamitra Hospitals to its network and launched an initial public offering, with shares subsequently listed on Indian stock exchanges.

New facilities established in the following years included Aster MIMS Kannur and Aster RV Hospital in Bengaluru in 2019. In 2021, the company opened a hospital in Kottakkal focused on women and children, followed by Aster Whitefield in Bengaluru in 2023.

In November 2023, Aster DM Healthcare announced a plan to separate its GCC and India businesses, approved by shareholders in January 2024 and completed in April 2024, when a consortium led by Fajr Capital acquired a 65% stake in the GCC business — now operating independently as Aster DM Healthcare FZC (trading as Aster Hospitals & Clinics, whose hospital operations across the UAE, Oman and Bahrain are led by Dr. Sherbaz Bichu as Chief Executive Officer). The Moopen family retained a 35% stake in the GCC business and operational control, while continuing to hold a 41.88% stake in Aster DM Healthcare in India; the company's subsidiary, Affinity Holdings, received US$907.6 million from the transaction. Alisha Moopen, daughter of founder Azad Moopen, serves as Managing Director and Group CEO of the separated GCC business, Aster DM Healthcare FZC.

In November 2024, Aster announced a merger with Quality Care India Ltd. (QCIL), to form Aster DM Quality Care Ltd.

In 2025, the company opened a 100-bed hospital in Sharjah and a 264-bed Aster MIMS hospital in Kasaragod, Kerala. It increased its stake in Dr. Ramesh Cardiac and Multispecialty Hospital Private Limited to 70.49%.

== Investors ==
In 2012, Olympus Capital Holdings Asia acquired a minority stake in Aster DM Healthcare for about US$100 million, becoming the company’s largest external investor. In May 2014, Olympus invested an additional US$60 million. Olympus exited its investment in June 2024. Following the GCC–India separation, the Moopen family continues to hold 41.88% of the Indian business.

== Subsidiaries ==
Aster MIMS in Kannur

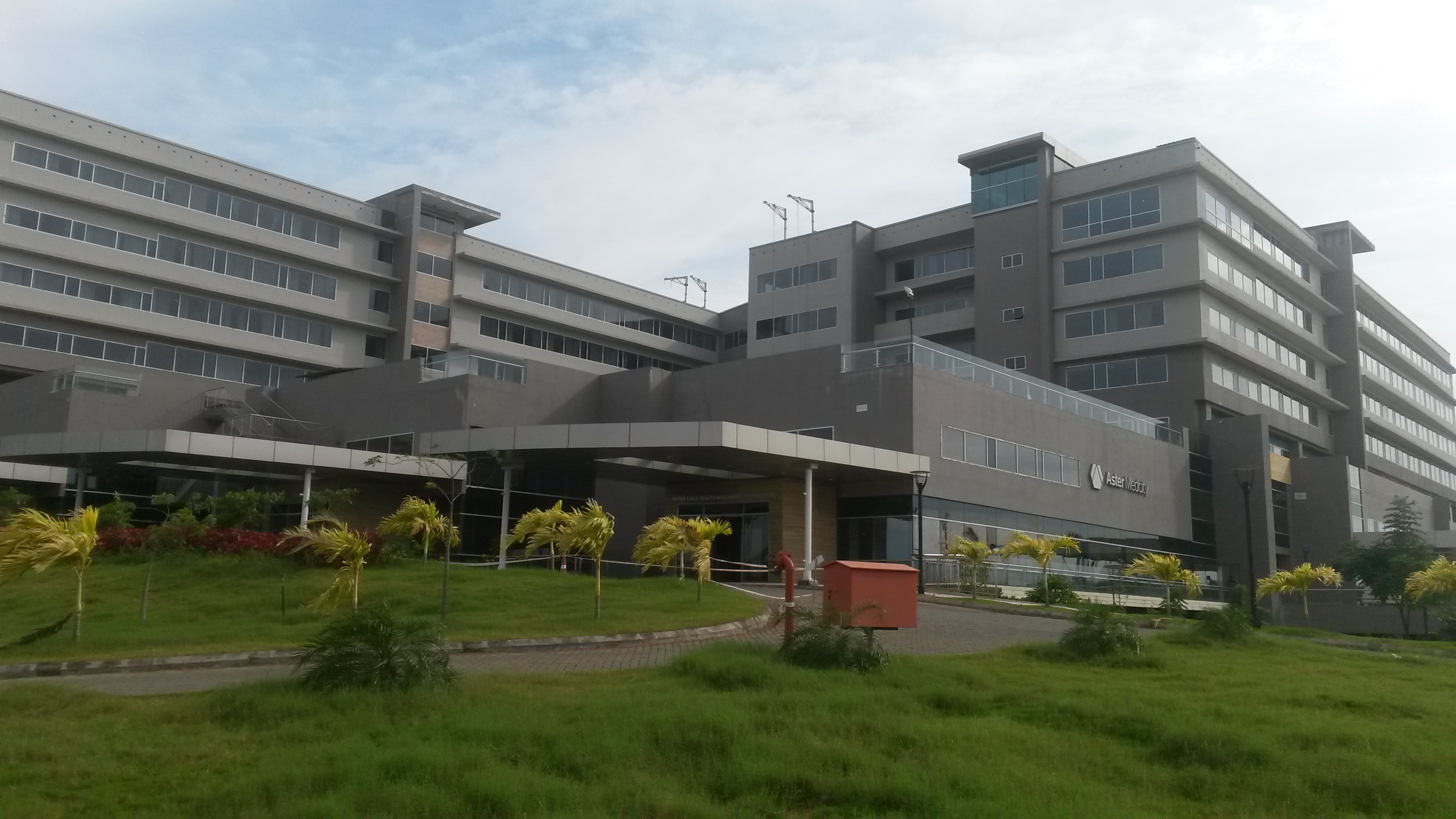
Aster Medcity in Kochi

Aster DM Healthcare operates through multiple subsidiaries and affiliates, including 9 subsidiaries, 67 step-down subsidiaries, and 4 associate companies. Notable operations include:

- Aster Capital, Trivandrum is an upcoming multi-specialty hospital project in the capital city Trivandrum developed as part of the Aster healthcare network. The hospital is planned as a large super-specialty facility with advanced medical infrastructure and a wide range of clinical specialties including cardiology, oncology, neurology, orthopedics, and transplant services. Once operational, it is expected to significantly strengthen the private healthcare ecosystem in the capital region by improving access to high-quality tertiary care and modern medical technology
- Aster Medcity, Kochi, Kerala: Opened in 2015, this hospital is located on a 40-acre campus in Kochi, Kerala. At present, it is a 1745 bed quaternary care healthcare centre in a 40-acre campus.
- Aster Pharmacy: Established in 1989, it operates a network of pharmacies across India.
- Aster Labs: Formerly known as Aster Diagnostic Centre, this division provides diagnostic services and operates a laboratory in Bengaluru, along with 20 satellite laboratories and over 190 patient service centres across several Indian states. It offers a range of medical tests.
- Dr. Moopen’s Medical College, Wayanad, Kerala: A medical college in Wayanad offering undergraduate and postgraduate programs in medicine, nursing, and pharmacy.
- Aster Health Academy: An initiative for healthcare education and professional training.

== Community initiatives ==
=== Aster Guardians Global Nursing Award ===
The Aster Guardians Global Nursing Award (AGGNA) was established in 2022 to recognize nurses in areas such as patient care, leadership, education, community service, and healthcare innovation. The first award was presented in Dubai in May 2022 to Anna Qabale Duba of Kenya. The second edition took place in London in May 2023, with Margaret Helen Shepherd from the United Kingdom receiving the award. The third edition was held in Bengaluru in November 2024, with over 78,000 applicants from more than 200 countries. Winners are selected by an independent jury, with Ernst & Young LLP serving as the external evaluation partner.

== See also ==
- Health care provider
