= Kalpakanchery =

- Town
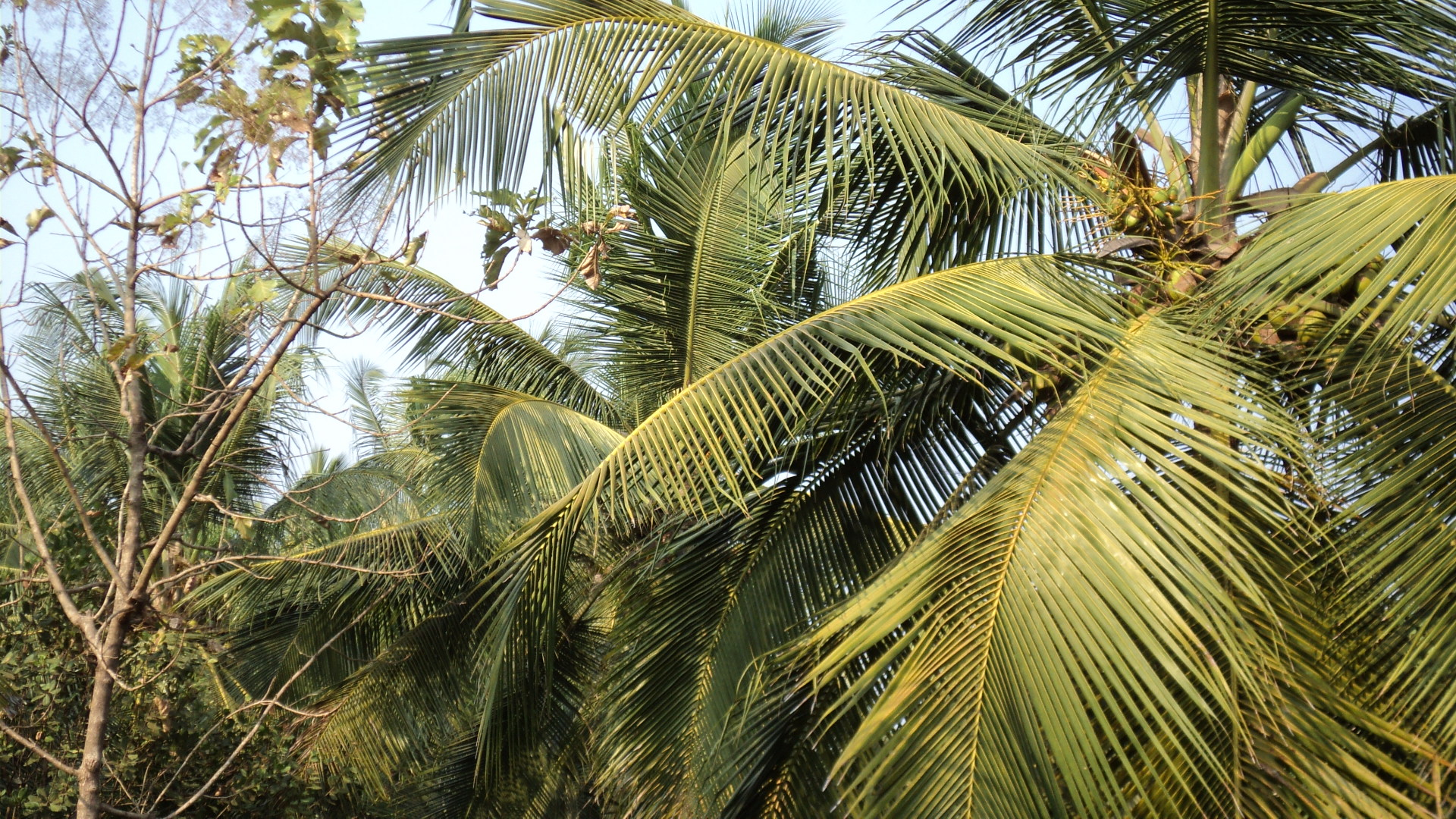
- Kalpakanchery
- Interactive map of Kalpakanchery
- Coordinates: 10.938°N 75.987°E
- Country: India
- State: Kerala
- District: Malappuram
- Panchayat formation: 10 October 1940; 85 years ago

Government
  - Type: Grama Panchayat
  - Body: Kalpakanchery Grama Panchayat
  - President: A. P. Sabah
  - Vice president: Edathadathil Sabira

Area
  - Total: 16.25 km^{2} (6.27 sq mi)

Population (2011)
  - Total: 33,721
  - Density: 2,075/km^{2} (5,370/sq mi)

Languages
  - Official: Malayalam

2011 Census
  - Sex ratio (2011): 1191 ♀/1000♂
  - Literacy (2011): 94.37%
- Time zone: UTC+5:30 (IST)
- PIN: 676551, 676510
- Telephone code: 0494
- Vehicle registration: KL-55 (Tirur)
- Nearest towns: Kottakkal; Tirur; Valanchery
- Niyamasabha constituency: Tirur
- Block Panchayat: Kuttippuram
- Website: www.lsgkerala.in/kalpakancherypanchayat

Kalpakanchery is a town and a Gram Panchayat in Tirur Taluk, Malappuram district, Kerala, India. The town is located 8 kilometres (5.0 mi) east of Tirur and 21 kilometres (13 mi) south-west of Malappuram.

Kadungathukundu, Puthanathani, Kurukathani, and Randathani are four major towns within Kalpakanchery. The National Highway 66 passes through the town. The town is a centre of academic institutions and other offices. There are several educational institutions, healthcare institutions, two industrial training centres, Kalpakanchery police station, Bafakhy Yatheem Khana (orphanage), post office, Kalpakanchery Sub-registrar Office, and Kalpakanchery Panchayat Office in the town. The town historically had a weekly market on Tuesdays known as Melangadi Chantha. The weekly market was held at present-day Melangadi, between Puthanathani and Kadungathukundu. The municipal towns of Tirur, Kottakkal, and Valanchery are just within 8 or 9 kilometres (5.0 or 5.6 mi) from here.

== Etymology ==
The term Kalpakanchery is believed to evolve from a combination of two Malayalam words, Kalpakam (Coconut tree) and Chery (Street), which means the street of coconut trees.

== Demography ==
As of the 2011 India census, Kalpakanchery had a population of 33,721 with 15,391 males and 18,330 females. The literacy rate of the village in 2011 was 94.37%. Malayalam is the most spoken language.

=== Education ===
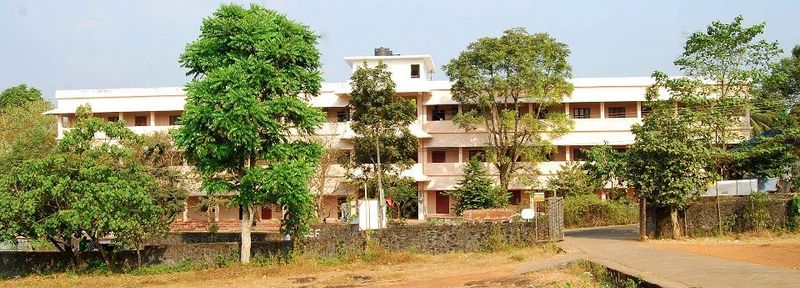
GVHSS Kalpakanchery

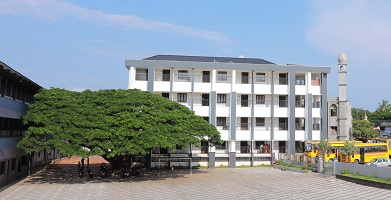
BYKRHS, Kadungathukundu

As of 2011 census, the town contains 2 pre-primary schools, 13 primary schools, 5 middle schools, 3 secondary schools, 3 senior secondary schools, 3 vocational training schools, a special school for disabled, and one more school. GMLPS Paleth, established in 1902, is one of the oldest primary schools in the town. GVHSS Kalpakanchery, established in 1920, is one of the oldest secondary schools in the town. Educational institutions in the town include:

Name	Type	Sector
BYKAS College for Women, Kalpakanchery	Arts&Science College	Private
Bafakhy ITI college, Kadungathukundu	Industrial Training Institute	Private
Amina ITI college, Kadungathukundu	Industrial Training Institute	Private
BYK B.Ed. Training College, Kadungathukundu	Professional College	Private
GVHSS Kalpakanchery	Higher Secondary School	Govt.
MSMHSS, Kallingalparamba	Higher Secondary School	Aided
BYKRHS, Kadungathukundu	High school	Private
GUPS, Randathani	Primary school	Govt.
Rahmani Primary School, Randathani	Primary school	Private
Najath Public School, Randathani	Primary school	Private
GMLPS, Paleth	Primary school	Govt.
GMLPS, Parapuram	Primary school	Govt.
GMPLS, Paravannur	Primary school	Govt.
AMLPS, Paravannur	Primary school	Aided
GMLPS, Ayirani	Primary school	Govt.
AMLPS, Thozhanur west	Primary school	Aided
AMLPS, Thozhanur east	Primary school	Aided
GLPS, Kalpakanchery	Primary school	Govt.
GMLPS, Manjachola	Primary school	Govt.
GMLPS, Kananchery	Primary school	Govt.

=== Health ===
As of 2011 census, there is a Primary health centre, 3 primary health subcentres, a maternity and child welfare centre, 2 hospital alternative medicines, a dispensary, 2 veterinary hospitals, a family welfare centre, 2 charitable private hospitals, and 12 medicinal shops in the town.

A government Ayurvedic hospital and a government veterinary dispensary function at Thozhanur, near Randathani.

== Civic administration ==
Kalpakanchery Gram Panchayat office

The region is administered by the Kalpakanchery Grama Panchayat. It is composed of 19 wards:

Kalpakanchery Grama Panchayat

Kalpakanchery is a part of Kuttippuram Block Panchayat and Tirur (State Assembly constituency).

Wards
Ward	Name
1	Parapuram
2	Variyath
3	Randathani
4	Kizhakepuram
5	Tharalad
6	Manjachola
7	Kallingal
8	Paravannur Chola
9	Padathepeedika
10	Paravannur
11	Ayirani
12	Kadungathukundu
13	Kalpakanchery
14	Thottayi
15	Kananchery
16	Paleth
17	Varambingal
18	Kallingalparamba
19	Kundamchina

=== Law and Order ===
Kalpakanchery police station has jurisdiction over seven villages namely Kalpakanchery, Valavannur, Ponmundam, Cheriyamundam, Perumanna-Klari, Athavanad, and Tirunavaya. The station was established in 1919, under British Administration. It comes under Tirur court.

== Connectivity ==
- Railway Station: Tirur railway station is just 10 kilometres (6.2 mi) away from the town. Almost every train stops here.
- Road: Kalpakanchery is well connected to the other cities by road, National Highway-66 passes through the town. There are regular buses plying to other cities including Malappuram, Kozhikode, Kochi, Thrissur, and Coimbatore. There are a few private buses offering over night journeys to Bangalore, Trivandrum, and Coimbatore.
- Nearest Airport: The Karipur International Airport is approximately 30 kilometres (19 mi) away.

== Notable people ==
- Azad Moopen
