= GVHSS Kalpakanchery =

School in Kerala, India

Govt. Vocational Higher Secondary School, Kalpakanchery
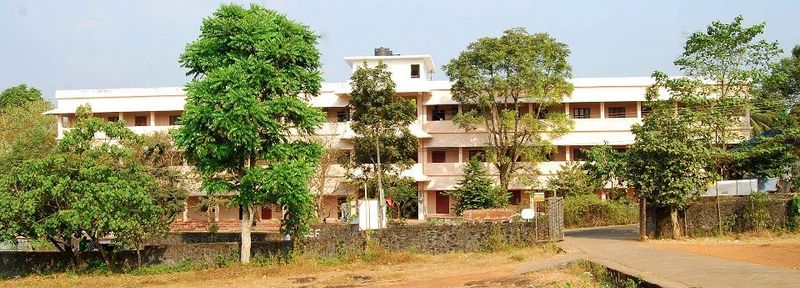
- Higher Secondary Block

Location
- Kalpakanchery, Kerala, 676551; India; 10.937900°N 75.977155°E

Information
- Other name: Government Vocational Higher Secondary School Kalpakanchery
- Type: High school/higher secondary school/ Vocational Higher Secondary School
- Established: 1 June 1920; 106 years ago
- School board: Higher Secondary Schools - Kerala Education Department
- School district: Malappuram
- Category: Government
- School number: 11150
- School code: Higher secondary - 19022
- Grades: 5-12
- Gender: Co-Education
- Capacity: 3000+
- Language: English, Malayalam

Government Vocational Higher Secondary School (GVHSS) Kalpakanchery is a Vocational Higher Secondary school in Kalpakanchery, in the Indian state of Kerala. Established in 1920, it is one of the oldest schools in Malappuram.

== History ==
The school was functioning as a center in Melangadi, Kalpakanchery in 1920. It became an elementary school in 1933 at Kadungathukund. It was upgraded to a High School in 1958. The school had become the center of literacy for people across the district. The higher secondary section of the school opened in 2000.

The first LP school in Kalpakancheri was established by Malabar Wana British Government after the reign of Tipu Sultan. At that time, the first president of Kalpakancheri panchayat, Kochunni Moopan, known as Alikutty Moopan, established the LP School at Angadi, later elevated to a UP School. The school was taken over by the government and shifted to Kadungathukund. After that it was upgraded to a High School. The school produced many prominent figures in politics, culture and education. During the 1980s, the institution gained the reputation for enrolling the largest number of Muslim girls in the district. At that time the school was working on a shift system.

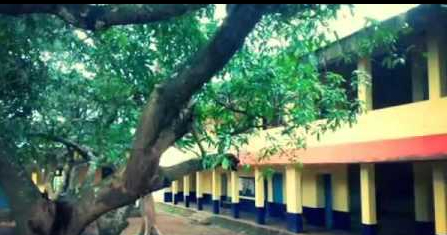
Government Vocational Higher Secondary School, Kalpakanchery

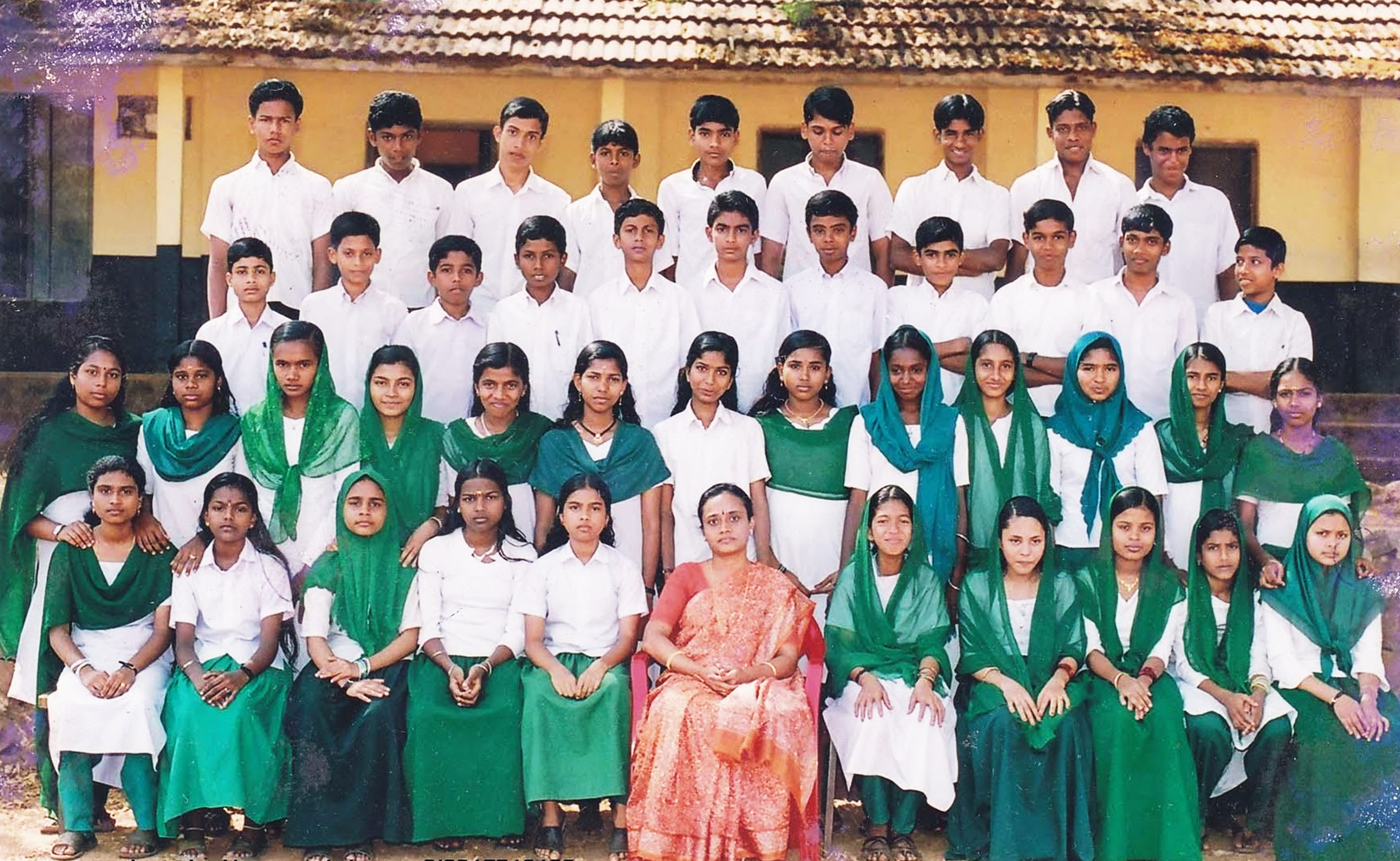
10th-B Class photo on the grounds of the Government Vocational Higher Secondary School - 2007

=== Achievements ===
SSLC exam scores
Year	Percentage
2008-2009	86
2009-2010	89
2010-2011	89
2011-2012	91
2012-2013	93
2013-2014	95
2014-2015	97
2015-2016	98
2016-2017	99
2022-2023	100
2023-2024	100

== Notable people ==
- Azad Moopen - healthcare entrepreneur
- Kurukkoli Moideen - politician from Kerala who represents Tirur Assembly constituency
