= Healthcare in the United Arab Emirates =

Life expectancy at birth in the United Arab Emirates

The United Arab Emirates has enacted federal legislation to require universal healthcare. Free healthcare is provided for Emiratis, while health insurance is mandated for citizens of other countries. Employers and sponsors are required to provide health insurance for the expatriate worker or the sponsored person. In the UAE, employers must also provide health insurance for up to one spouse and three dependents, while in Dubai expats are required to provide insurance for their dependents.

Standards of health care are considered to be generally high in the United Arab Emirates, resulting from increased government spending during strong economic years. According to the UAE government, total expenditures on health care from 1996 to 2003 were AED 1,601,384,360.05 (USD$436 million). According to the World Health Organization (WHO), in 2004, total expenditures on health care constituted 2.9 percent of gross domestic product (GDP), and the per capita expenditure for health care was USD$497. Healthcare is free for UAE citizens and there are low-cost options for non-citizens.

The World Bank ranked Dubai and Abu Dhabi as being the second and third, respectively, most popular medical tourism destinations in the region, behind Jordan. In the first half of 2015, Dubai had attracted 260,000 medical tourists, of the total of 630,831 medical tourists who visited 26 hospitals that year, 46% of whom had travelled from outside of the UAE.

== Origins of health care in the UAE ==
The start of modern health care in the United Arab Emirates can be traced to the days when the area was known as the Trucial States. In 1943, a small healthcare centre was opened in the Al Ras area of Dubai. In 1951, under the patronage of Sheikh Saeed bin Maktoum, the Ruler of Dubai, the first phase of the Al Maktoum Hospital was built and continued over succeeding years until a 157-bed hospital was completed. In 1960, Sheikhs Shakhbut and Zayed of Abu Dhabi visited an American mission in Muscat and were so impressed by what they saw that they invited the couple in charge, Pat and Marian Kennedy, to open a clinic in Al Ain, which they did in the November of that year. This became officially known as the Oasis Hospital, unofficially as the “Kennedy Hospital” to local people. In 1966, a small outpatient department opened in Abu Dhabi, followed a year later by the appointment of Dr Philip Horniblow with a brief to develop a national health service. This led the then ruler of Abu Dhabi, Sheikh Zayed, to open a new hospital, the Central Hospital, in 1968.

== Health care systems ==
The UAE had 40 public Hospitals in 2007, compared with only seven in 1970. The Ministry of Health undertook a multimillion-dollar program to expand health facilities and hospitals, medical centres, and a trauma centre in the seven emirates. A state-of-the-art general hospital opened in Abu Dhabi with a projected bed capacity of 143, a trauma unit, and the first home health care program in the UAE. To attract wealthy UAE nationals and expatriates who have traditionally travelled abroad for medical care, in 2010, Dubai completed Dubai Healthcare City, a hospital free zone to offer international-standard advanced private healthcare and provide an academic medical training centre. 12 million people visit Dubai every year for healthcare services.

=== Electronic health records ===
Abu Dhabi is leading the way in using national Electronic health record data as a live longitudinal cohort in the assessment of risk of cardiovascular disease.

=== Emirate of Abu Dhabi ===
Effective January 2006, all residents of Abu Dhabi are covered by a new comprehensive health insurance program; costs to be shared between employers and employees. Prior to 2007, government-owned health care facilities were managed by the General Authority for Health Services (GAHS). In 2007, this authority was restructured into:

- Abu Dhabi Department of Health which is responsible for regulating the healthcare industry and developing Abu Dhabi's health policy.
- Abu Dhabi Health Services Company (SEHA) is responsible for managing government-owned healthcare facilities in Abu Dhabi. SEHA manages, in 2008, 57 primary health care centers; 13 hospitals; three maternal and child health centers; three specialized dental centers; one centre for autism; and five specialised facilities, including rehab, a blood bank and an herbal center.
- The Ministry of Health and Prevention (MoHAP) initiated a campaign to combat dengue fever by establishing nine dedicated, specialized teams, which successfully eliminated 409 mosquito breeding sites, conducted 1,200 surveys related to mosquitoes, and set up an insect laboratory. Over 309 blood samples were analyzed as part of the campaign. 134 additional health facilities were also established to provide appropriate health and treatment services for dengue fever patients.

=== Other Emirates ===
- Dubai Health Authority (DHA): for public and private healthcare facilities in the Emirate of Dubai
- Dubai Healthcare City (DHCC): for private healthcare facilities with Dubai Healthcare City.
- Ministry of Health and Prevention (MoHAP): for public and private healthcare facilities in the Emirates of Sharjah, Ajman and the rest of the north Emirates, also few public facilities in Dubai like Al Baraha Hospital and Al Amal Psychiatric Hospital.

Surveys are conducted under the supervision of Dubai Health Authority (DHA) which is empowered to set and implement the policies and strategies for health.

A survey initiated in 2012 by DHA with the intention of surveying all healthcare facilities in Dubai in order to set up Dubai Clinical Services Capacity Plan 2020 (DCSCP). From September 2 to October 25, 2012, the Emirate's first comprehensive survey of health care services was carried. The purpose of the study was to identify the gaps in Dubai healthcare market and in planning future health care services in Dubai.

== See also ==
- Health in the United Arab Emirates
- Abortion in the United Arab Emirates
