= C. Mammutty =

Indian politician

Member of Kerala Niyamasabha
- In office 2011–2021
- Preceded by: P. P. Abdullakkutty
- Succeeded by: Kurukkoli Moideen
- Constituency: Tirur (State Assembly constituency)

Personal details
- Born: 10 February 1960 (age 66) Kelloor
- Party: Indian Union Muslim League
- Spouse: Laila
- Children: Four daughters
- Website: http://www.cmammutty.com/

C. Mammutty is a member of 13th and 14th Kerala Legislative Assembly. He belongs to Indian Union Muslim League and represented Tirur (State Assembly constituency) from 2011 to 2021. He was previously elected to Kerala Legislative Assembly in 2001.

== Positions held ==
- Entered politics through M.S.F. and was its Branch Secretary (1971)
- Taluk Secretary (1975), Taluk President (1977), District Treasurer (1978), District General Secretary (1979), District President (1980) and State General Secretary (1982–85) of Muslim Students Federation - MSF
- Member, State Youth Welfare Board (1985–88)
- Editor, M.S.F. Review Magazine (1982–88)
- Union Councillor, Calicut University (1981)
- Union Secretary and Students Council Secretary, Calicut University (1982)
- State General Secretary, Muslim Youth League (1988-1999)
- Chief Editor, 'Thoolika Magazine' (1988–99)
- Joint Secretary, Muslim League, Wayanad (1989)
- Chairman, Hantex (1993–96)
- Member, All India Handloom Director Board (1993–96)

== Personal life ==
He was born on 10 February 1960 at Kelloor. He has a master's in arts and bachelor's in law. He is a businessman. He is married to Laila and has four daughters.
