= Ayyaya =

Village in Kerala, India

Ayyaya, India is a small village in the state of Kerala, India, located in the Tirur, Malappuram district.

== Naming ==
The name Ayyaya means "father" in the language of Telugu. This facet of a familial group is included in the practices of tharadavu.

== Geography ==
The town Tirur is located 9 km from Ayyaya by way of State Highway No.71 and provides the nearest railway station. SH71 also provides direct access to National highway No.66. The northern stretch NH66 connects to Goa and Mumbai and the southern stretch connects to Cochin and Trivandrum. The nearest airport is located 34.5 km away at Kozhikode. The Vellachal Bust Station is located in Ayyaya, at the intersection of Vellachal - Ozhur and Korad Roads.

The town is located less than 5 miles from the Western coast of India, the Arabian Sea. It is also located around 2000 feet from the headwaters from the Karingapara River, which eventually joins several other streams and flows into the sea.

Local buildings include the Ayyaya Putthan Palli mosque, Vailathur Rabbit Farm, and the C P Pocker Haji Memorial Higher Secondary School.

It is located at about 70 m elevation.

== Educational institutions ==
There are two main schools in Ayyaya:

Name	Type	Sector
AMUP School, Ayyaya, Ozhur	UP School	Aided
C P Pocker Haji Memorial Higher Secondary School	Higher Secondary	Aided
AMLP School, Ayyaya	Lower primary	Aided
