= Puthiyakadpuram =

Puthiyakadpuram is the coastal area of west Thirur municipality in Malappuram district of Kerala state, India. It is naturally important place in Niramaruthur Panchayath, the west side is protected by "Arabian Sea" and East with "kanolikanal".

== Transportation ==
Puthiyakadappuram or New Beach village connects to other parts of India through Tirur town. National highway No.66 passes through Tirur and the northern stretch connects to Goa and Mumbai. The southern stretch connects to Cochin and Trivandrum. Highway No.966 goes to Palakkad and Coimbatore. The nearest airport is at Kozhikode. The nearest major railway station is at Tirur.
