= Kurukkoli Moideen =

Indian politician

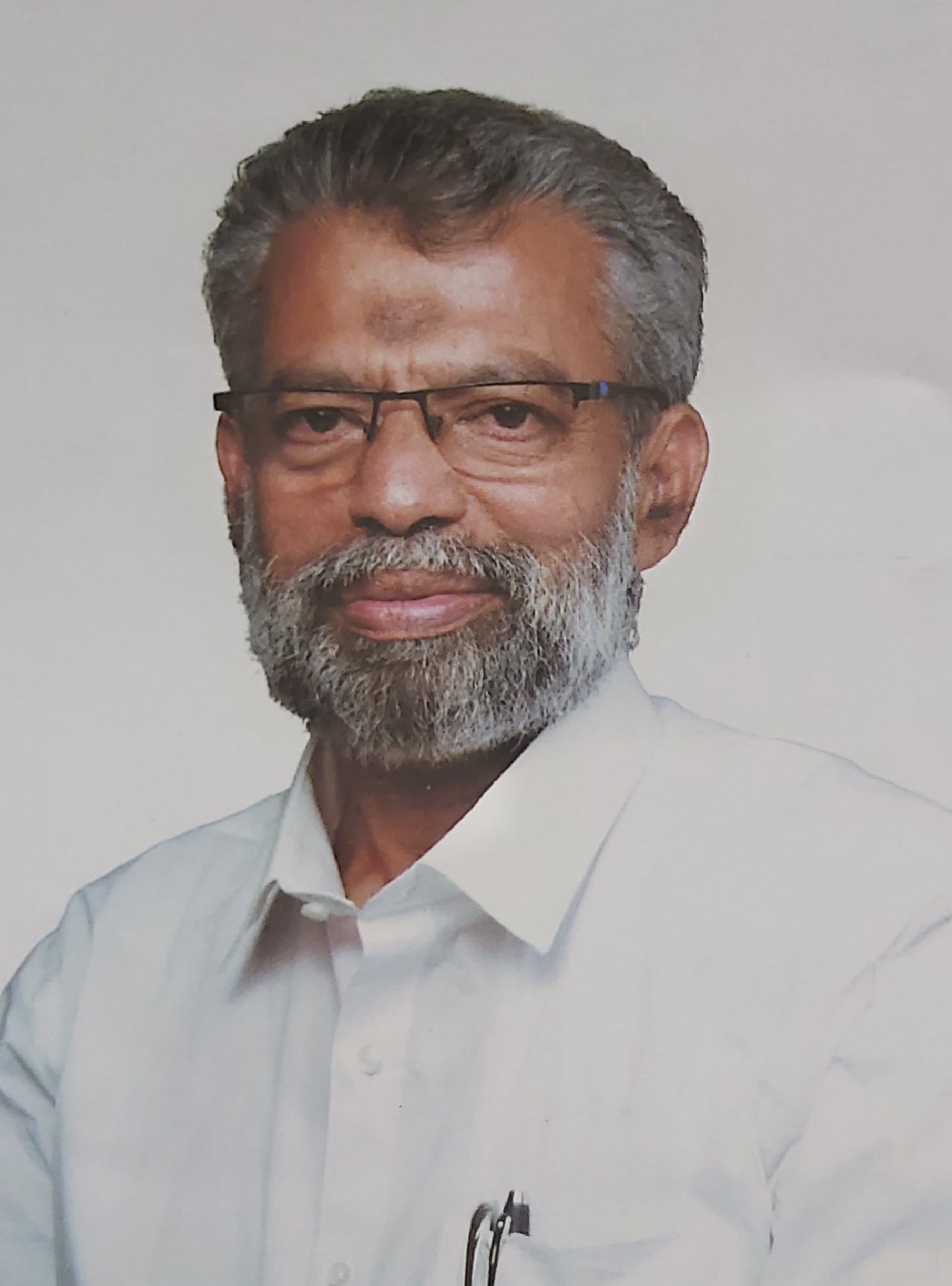

Member of the Kerala Legislative Assembly for Tirur
- Incumbent
- Assumed office May 2021
- Preceded by: C. Mammutty

Personal details
- Born: 1 November 1959 (age 66)
- Party: Indian Union Muslim League
- Spouse: Nafeesa
- Occupation: Business

Kurukkoli Moideen is a politician from Kerala, India. He represents Tirur assembly constituency in 15th Kerala State Legislative Assembly. He belongs to Indian Union Muslim League.

== Personal life ==
Kurukkoli Moideen was born on 1 November 1959 at Valavannur in Malappuram district, Kerala. His father is Kunjalan. His wife Nafeesa is a home-maker. He did his secondary education from GVHSS Kalpakanchery.

== Political career ==
Kurukkoli Moideen entered politics through his activism in Muslim Students Federation. He then became an active politician from Indian Union Muslim League. In 2010, he won elections to Valavannur Grama Panchayath. He has served as Tanur Block Panchayat President in 2015 and as the chairman of district panchayat standing committee. In May 2021, he won the Kerala Assembly Elections from Tirur (State Assembly) constituency.

He has assumed various organisational positions in Indian Union Muslim League. It includes the state presidency of IUML's Swathanthra Karshaka Sangham and the editorship of Swathanthra Karshakan, a magazine published by IUML's farmers front. He has also made contributions in cooperative movement. He has held the presidency of Valavannur Service Co-operative Bank and vice presidency of Malappuram District Co-operative Bank.

He supports the demand for the formation of Tirur district in Kerala by taking out the coastal regions in Malappuram. He says, a new district would attend the question of development deficit in Malappuram district substantively. He supports the demand for the construction of a Tirur-Nilambur metro on the Tirur-Nilambur route to solve the traffic congestion in the Malappuram metropolitan area. For this, a proposal has been introduced in the Kerala Legislative Assembly.

=== 2021 Kerala State Assembly Election ===
Kurukkoli Moideen defeated Gafoor P. Lillis from CPI(M) in 2021 assembly elections in Tirur (State Assembly) constituency. He secured a vote share of 48.21% and a winning margin of 7214 votes.

2021 Kerala Legislative Assembly election: Tirur
Party	Candidate	Votes	%	±%
IUML	Kurukkoli Moideen	82,314	48.21%	▲2.00
LDF	Gafoor P. Lillis	75,100	43.98%	▲1.3
BJP	Adbul Salaam	9,097	5.33%%	▼0.41
SDPI	Ashraf	2,712	1.9%	▲0.96
Independent	Moideen Meenthrathakath	477	0.28%	N/A
NOTA	None of the above	417	0.24%	N/A
Margin of victory		7,214	4.93%	▲14.14
Turnout		1,70,742	78.36%	▲2.38
IUML hold		Swing	▲2.00	
