= Padinjarekkara Beach =

Beach in Kerala, India

Padinjarekkara Beach Azhimugam Beach
- Beach
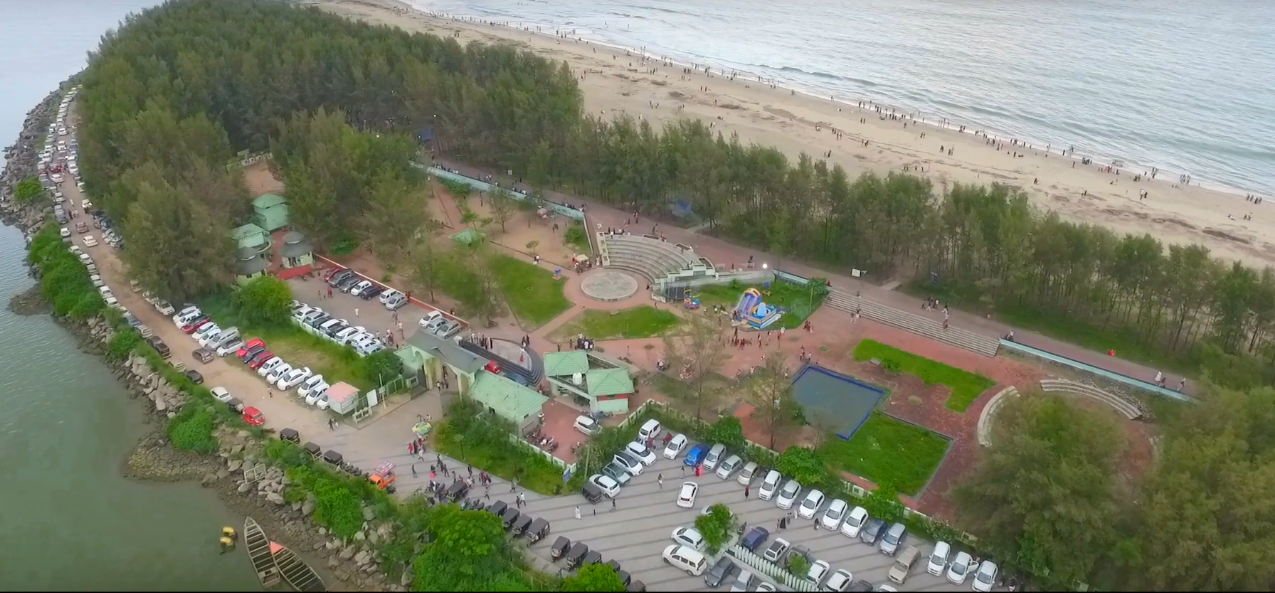
- Padinharekkara Sky view

- Location within India Location within Kerala
- Coordinates: 10.794°N 75.909°E
- Location: Padinjarekkara, Tirur, Kerala

Dimensions
  - Length: 1,600+ m
- Access: Bus Station - 16.1 m, Railway Station - 17.4 km, Ferry Terminal - 3.1 km

Padinjarekkara Beach, also known as Azhimugam Beach, is a beach and (Azhimugam) tourist destiny at Tirur, Malappuram district in the Indian state of Kerala. Padinjarekkara Beach is the first 'Kite flying event ' in Kerala.

== Events and attractions ==
=== Events ===
- Kite flying event

=== Attractions ===
- Paramotoring

== Gallery ==
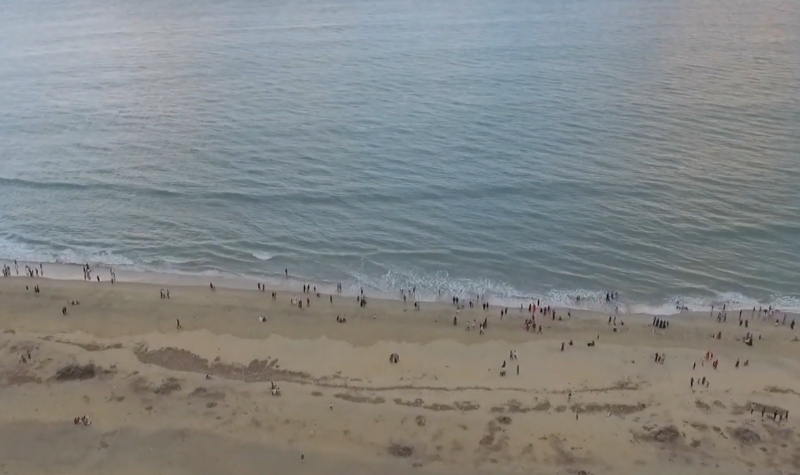

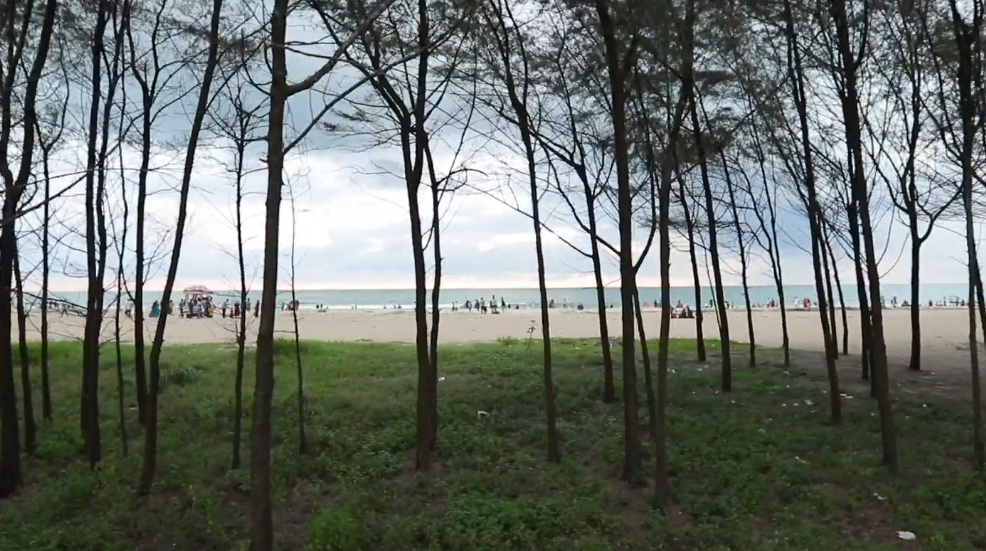
