= Alisha Moopen =

Healthcare executive based in Dubai

- Education: University of Michigan; Harvard University
- Occupation: Healthcare executive
- Title: Managing Director and Group CEO of Aster DM Healthcare
- Parent: Azad Moopen (father)

Alisha Moopen is a healthcare executive based in Dubai, serving as the Managing Director and Group CEO of Aster DM Healthcare's Gulf Cooperation Council (GCC) business. Founded by her father, Azad Moopen, the healthcare group operates across seven countries. She became the deputy managing director in 2019 and took charge of its GCC operations following the separation of its India and GCC businesses in 2024.

== Early life and education ==
Moopen is the eldest daughter of Azad Moopen, a physician and entrepreneur who founded Aster DM Healthcare, and grew up in Dubai.

She holds a degree in finance and accounting from the University of Michigan and qualified as a chartered accountant with the Institute of Chartered Accountants of Scotland. She also studied global leadership and public policy at Harvard University.

== Career ==
Moopen began her career in consulting at Ernst & Young in the United Kingdom. She later took up a senior finance position at Medcare Hospital in Dubai, which is operated by Aster DM Healthcare, and moved into an operational role a year later.

Moopen joined Aster DM Healthcare as a Director in 2013 and served as Deputy Managing Director from 2019 to 2023. She established a programme to train female employees for leadership positions at the company.

A Harvard Business School teaching case published in 2021 examined budgeting decisions she faced during the COVID-19 pandemic. During the pandemic, she worked on video consultation services and field hospital initiatives in India.

In April 2024, Aster announced the completion of the separation of its Indian and GCC businesses. A consortium led by Fajr Capital acquired a 65% stake in the GCC business, while the Moopen family retained 35% along with management and operational rights. At the time, Moopen was Managing Director and Group Chief Executive Officer of the GCC business.

== Recognition ==
The World Economic Forum selected Moopen as a Young Global Leader in 2018. She was included in Business Today's Most Powerful Women selection for 2022. In 2024, she received the Pravasi Bhushan award, presented by the Governor of West Bengal, C. V. Ananda Bose. Forbes Middle East ranked her ninth on its 2025 list of the region's 100 most powerful businesswomen.

== Personal life ==
Moopen is married and has three children.
