= Valavannur =

Grampanchayat in Malappuram District, Kerala, India

- Village
- Location in Kerala, India Valavannur (India)
- Coordinates: 10.930°N 75.966°E
- Country: India
- State: Kerala
- District: Malappuram
- Panchayat formation: 1962; 64 years ago

Government
  - Type: Grama Panchayat
  - Body: Valavannur Grama Panchayat

Area
  - Total: 15.28 km^{2} (5.90 sq mi)

Population (2011)
  - Total: 33,159
  - Density: 2,170/km^{2} (5,600/sq mi)

Languages
  - Official: Malayalam

Human Development
  - Sex ratio (2011): 1174 ♀/1000♂
  - Literacy (2011): 94.19%
- Time zone: UTC+5:30 (IST)
- PIN: 676551
- Telephone code: 0494
- Vehicle registration: KL-55
- Nearest towns: Tirur; Kottakkal; Valanchery
- Niyamasabha constituency: Tirur
- Block Panchayat: Tanur
- Website: valavannur.com

Valavannur is a Grama Panchayat in the Malappuram District of the Indian state of Kerala The town is located 21 kilometres (13 mi) south-west of Malappuram.

== Places ==
- Valavannur Juma Masjid
- Cheravannur North Juma Masjid
- Kadungathukundu Mahallu Juma Masjid

== Education ==
- Ansar Arabic College Valavannur
- Ansar English School Valavannur

== Important towns ==
Kadungathukundu town lies in two Panchayats, Kalpakanchery and Valavannur. Kadungathukundu is also an educational hub.

== Demographics ==
As of 2011 India census, Valavannur had a population of 33159 with 15255 males and 17904 females.

== See also ==
- Kalpakanchery
- Kurukkoli Moideen
