= Anna Qabale Duba =

Kenyan nurse

Anna Qabale Duba is a female Kenyan nurse and an epidemiologist known for her work fighting against cultural practices such as female genital mutilation and early marriages.

== Early life and career ==
Duba was born in Torbi, a village in Marsabit County, Kenya. She was the youngest child in a polygamous family of 19 siblings and 3 mothers, of which her mother was the first. At the age of 12, Duba was subjected to female genital mutilation and escaped forced early marriage at age 14. Duba was the only educated child in her family. She attended Kenya Methodist University where she received a bachelor's degree in nursing. She went on to receive an M.S. degree from Moi University in Kenya. In 2016 she was a Mandela Washington Fellows in the United States. She also promotes the development of pastorialist's community in Kenya.

== Awards ==
In year 2022, Duba was crowned the first recipient of the Aster Guardians Global Nursing Award and used the funding to support educational options in her village. In year 2019, she won the Global Citizens' People's Choice Award in New York. She was also the former Miss Tourism Kenya.
