= Abortion in the United Arab Emirates =

Abortion in the United Arab Emirates (UAE) is only legal in five instances: if the pregnancy is the result of rape; if the pregnancy is a result of incest; at the request of the couple after the approval of a regulatory committee; if the continuation of the pregnancy puts the woman's life in danger; if the fetus has a serious congenital disorder.

In addition, the abortion must be performed within the first 120 days of pregnancy. The regulatory committee must be composed of an obstetrics and gynaecology specialist, a psychiatry specialist, and a representative from the Public Prosecution according to The Ministry of Health and Prevention. Non-citizen pregnant women must hold a valid UAE residency permit for a minimum of one year. Prior to 2024, the UAE did not permit abortions in cases of rape or incest. The legislation change aimed to reduce illegal and unsafe abortions. Since the change, abortion laws within the country have been described as less restrictive than some American states which do not permit abortions in cases of rape or incest, following the overturning of Roe v. Wade.

== Legality ==
Abortion law within the country is based on Sharia law (Islamic law), and was described as restrictive in 2007. Due to an absence of legal framework at the time detailing the cases in which abortions were allowed, very few abortions were carried out legally. Following the issue of the Medical Liability Law signed by Sheikh Khalifa bin Zayed Al Nahyan clarifying the circumstances in which abortions were allowed, the number began to increase, averaging at about 25 abortions per year in Corniche Hospital Abu Dhabi from 2013 to 2015.

Since then, substantial progress has been made in broadening the conditions under which abortions are permitted. As of 2019, the UAE is one of three countries in the Middle East and North Africa to extend circumstances in which abortion is allowed. In addition, abortion laws within the country have been described as less restrictive than some American states following the overturning of Roe v. Wade. UAE Federal Penal Code No. 3 of 1987 regulates the provisions of abortion under the "infringement on human life and bodily integrity". Abortion is defined as an any act that may lead to the death of a foetus or its exit from the womb before the natural date of birth. Under article 40 of the UAE Penal Code, whoever intentionally aborts may face imprisonment. The law does not punish for the crime of abortion unless it is intentional, so the crime is not committed by someone who accidentally causes a pregnant woman to miscarry, even in grave error. The Penal Code does not address the criminalization of induced abortion resulting in death; but article 87 of the Penal Code states that if multiple crimes are committed, the crime with the most severe penalty must be considered. In a 2021 case where a man beat his pregnant wife leading to the possibility of losing the foetus, the man was found guilty of assault and was ordered to pay AED 15,000. Such incidents have led to questioning on the possibility of legal loopholes. Assisting in an abortion illegally is a criminal offence punishable of up to seven years in prison.

Although abortions are currently permitted only if the pregnancy is under 120 days, many medical professionals in the country have advocated for a change in the law to allow abortions beyond this period, citing the inability to detect certain deformities before 120 days.

== History ==
Unwanted pregnancies have led to women in the UAE illegally procuring abortions or abandoning babies. A 2011 report by Gulf News found that the illegality and inaccessibility of abortion resulted in women purchasing cheap ulcer medication to end unwanted pregnancies. In an interview with a Filipino expatriate who sold such pills, she stated that demand for the tablets had grown due to social and moral values shifting while laws had not. The report found that such tablets did not guarantee an induced abortion, with failure in 15–20% of cases, and could result in death through bleeding or infection in rare cases. The demand for such pills were attributed to article 356 of the UAE Penal Code enforcing imprisonment and then deportation to mothers of children born out of wedlock. Such abortion pills sold on black markets can cost as much as AED 5000, while the price of such pills in most European countries is only AED 160. There have been several instances of arrests involving illegal abortions.

In October 2023, a legislation change allowed women to undergo abortions without spousal consent and permitted private licensed clinics to perform the procedure. In June 2024, it was announced that the circumstances in which an abortion could be obtained had extended to include rape and incest.
