= Philip Horniblow =

Philip James Horniblow, OBE (19 May 1928 – 13 August 2020) was a British Army officer, medical administrator, and mountaineer.
