= Health in the United Arab Emirates =

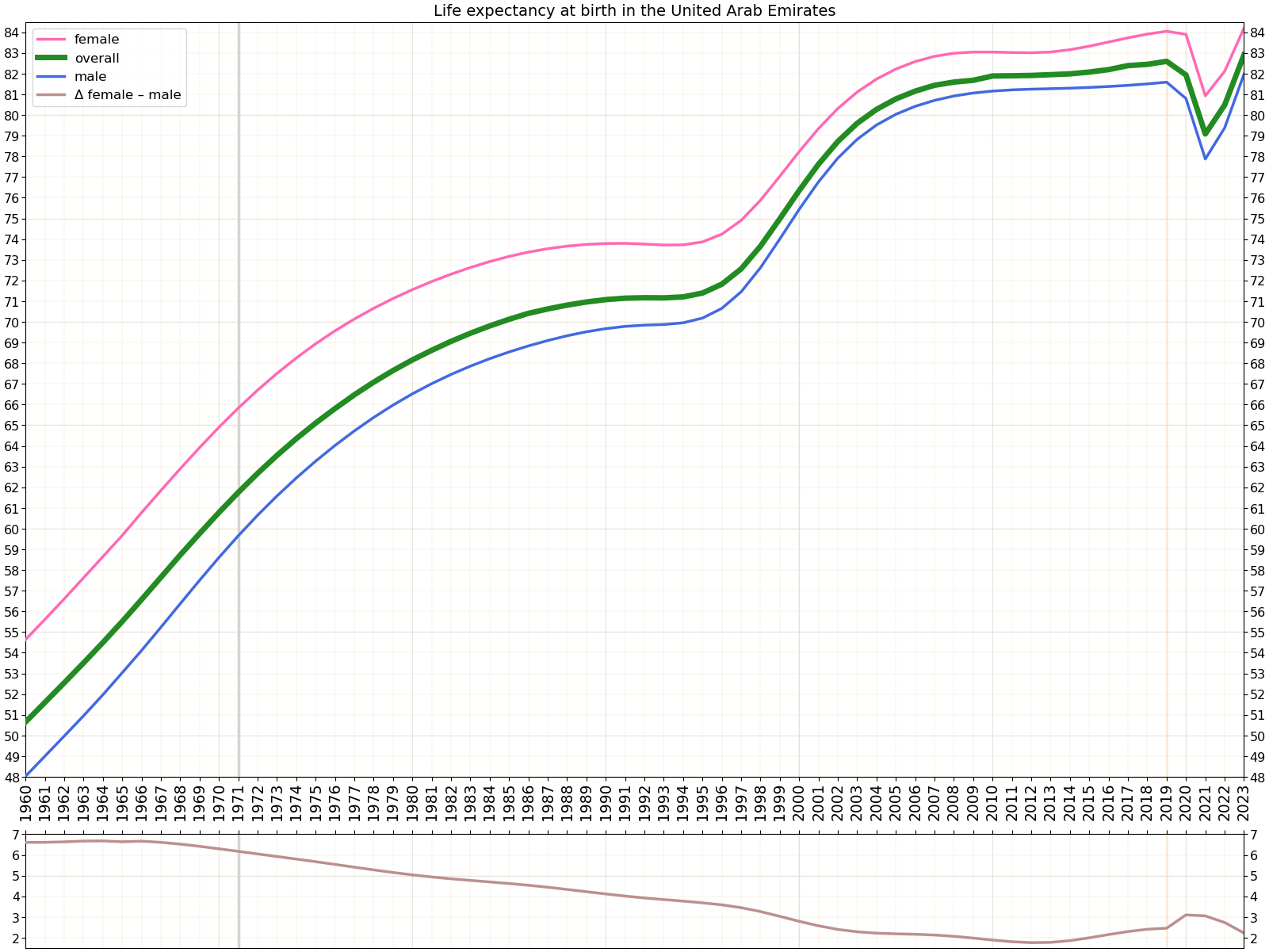
Life expectancy in the United Arab Emirates

Cardiovascular disease is the principal cause of death in the UAE, constituting 28 percent of total deaths; other major causes are accidents and injuries, malignancies, and congenital anomalies.

== Genetic Disorders ==
In 2009, 119 genetic disorders were identified among Emiratis and 241 among Arab citizens and expatriates combined in the UAE. This is the second-highest incidence of genetic disorders in the Arab world (after Oman). Autosomal recessive disorders are common in the UAE. Hemoglobinopathies are one of the most common disorders among the UAE nationals. Beta-thalassemia constitutes a major public health problem in the UAE. During 1989-2004, more than 850 patients have been registered at the Dubai Genetics and Thalassemia Center. Surveys have shown that the UAE exhibits one of the highest carrier frequencies of β-thalassemia in the Persian Gulf region which is 8.5%. Pre-marital medical examinations in the UAE, excluding the HAAD, include blood group tests, sickle cell anaemia, hepatitis B and C, German measles, haemoglobin variance, HIV/AIDS, thalassaemia, and syphilis.

The Health Authority – Abu Dhabi introduced premarital screening and counselling in 2011. 56,226 men and women preparing for marriage were tested for genetic and infectious disorders were tested between 2011 and the end of 2014. in 2014 16,247 people were tested, 342 were Beta-thalassaemia carriers, 8 had sickle-cell anaemia, 205 were sickle-cell anaemia carriers, 36 had syphilis and 140 had hepatitis B.

== HIV/AIDS ==
In 1985 the UAE established a national program to prevent transmission of acquired immune deficiency syndrome (AIDS) and to control its entry into the country. According to World Health Organization estimates, in 2002−3 fewer than 1,000 people in the UAE were living with human immunodeficiency virus (HIV)/AIDS.

== Obesity ==
Obesity is a growing health concern with health officials stating that obesity is one of the leading causes of preventable deaths in the United Arab Emirates. According to Forbes, United Arab Emirates ranks 18 on a 2007 list of fattest countries with a percentage of 68.3% of its citizens with an unhealthy weight.

== Diabetes ==
One out of every four citizens of the United Arab Emirates has diabetes, at a rate of roughly 20% for residents, 25% for Emirati nationals. UAE Ministerial Council declared 2009 "Anti-diabetes Year" on January 11, 2009.

== 2009 flu pandemic ==
- May 24: First case confirmed.
- June 25: 8th confirmed H1N1 case
- July 21: 110 H1N1 cases in the country, of which 30 originated within inside. The government has announced urgent steps to tackle the virus, including setting up thermal scanners at malls and giving companies the right to cancel residence visas of employees who contract it abroad.
- July 27: Community outbreaks confirmed in United Arab Emirates
- July 31: 110 cases.
- August 21: MoH announces UAE's first swine flu death.

== Emirate of Dubai ==
A number of surveys have been conducted contributing in establishing comprehensive health promotion program and chalking out prevention and curative strategies. On 27 June 2010, The Dubai Health Authority (DHA) and Dubai Statistics Centre (DSC) collaboratively completed first most comprehensive Dubai Household Health Survey (DHHS). The survey covering 5,000 households provided a unique and unprecedented assessment of issues concerning health. Among 5,000 households, there were 2500 UAE National Households, 25oo Expatriate and 700 individuals from labor camps with the purpose of finding out the detailed information on issues such as healthcare utilization, health status, health spending and treatment abroad. According to the Head of Research and Performance Management in DHA’s Health Policy Strategy sector Dr. Eldaw Abdalla Suliman, the collected data will be analyzed over 18 months that will help in identifying and addressing Dubai’s health care issues. The Primary Healthcare Services Sector (PHCSS) of Dubai Health Authority started a health and Socio-economic survey intended to cover 3,000 families in beginning to understand health issues and risk factors affecting population of Dubai. A survey unveiled that 40% of school children in UAE are overweight and 15% are obese. The reasons attributed to these issues were growing trend among children to consume too much fast food and less physical activities. 30 minutes of exercise was suggested and led to initiating physical activities programs in schools of Dubai. A survey by DHA in 2012 covered about 5,000 residents, Emiratis and Expatriates revealed that education and chronic disease are the major factors in enhancing the risk of developing the mental and physical disabilities. Women reported more severe disability problems. According to the survey, there is a direct link between chronic disease and functional disabilities. The various factors taken into account were age, gender, nationality, income and other parameters.

A 2014 survey on 1,000 residents shows that unfit in UAE think they are healthy and reality is totally different. More than half the respondents are either overweight or obese and barely exercise. Inadequate sleeping habits, consumption of tobacco and smoking, carbonated beverages, increasing intake of junk food and lack of exercise is maximizing diabetes and hypertension. DHA has already warned people with heart diseases by considering hypertension a silent killer. A recent UAE mall study reveals that two thirds of women don’t exercise and one third are obese. The study on nearly 5,000 women consisted of questionnaire and tests identified the main indicators of health issues including smoking, high blood pressure, high blood sugar and cholesterol and body mass index. The collected data can be implemented by medical community in the Middle East for research efforts.

== See also ==
- Healthcare in the United Arab Emirates
