= Tirur =

Municipality in Kerala, India

- Municipality
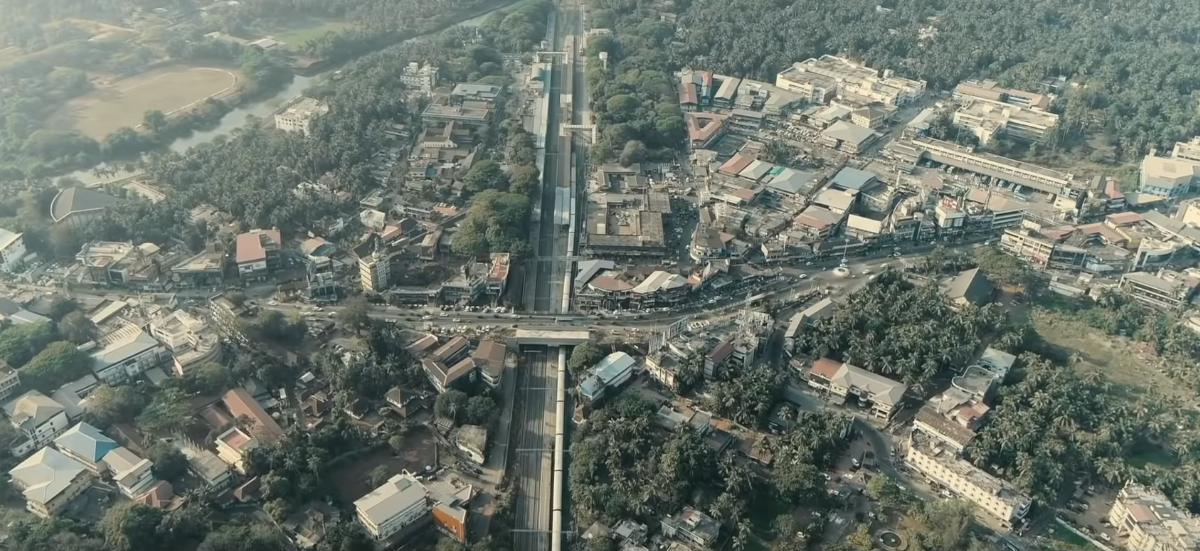
- A skyview of Tirur junction

- Location in Kerala, India Tirur (India)
- Coordinates: 10.9°N 75.92°E
- Country: India
- State: Kerala
- District: Malappuram

Government
  - Type: Municipality
  - Body: Tirur Municipality
  - Chairman: Ibrahim Haji Keezhedath (IUML)
  - Vice Chairperson: Sindhu Mangalassery (INC)

Area
  - Total: 16.55 km^{2} (6.39 sq mi)
- Elevation: 2 m (6.6 ft)

Population (2011)
  - Total: 56,058
  - Density: 3,387/km^{2} (8,773/sq mi)

Languages
  - Official: Malayalam, English
- Time zone: UTC+5:30 (IST)
- PIN: 676101,676102
- Telephone code: 0494
- Vehicle registration: KL-55
- Website: tirurmunicipality.lsgkerala.gov.in/en

Tirur (Malayalam: [t̪iɾuːr]) is a major municipal town in Tirur Taluk, Malappuram district, in the Indian state of Kerala, spread over an area of 16.55 square kilometres (6.39 sq mi).

It is one of the major business centers in Malappuram district and is situated 26 kilometres (16 mi) west of Malappuram and 52.5 kilometres (32.6 mi) south of Kozhikode, on the Shoranur–Mangalore section under Southern Railway.

Tirur is a major trading centre for electronic devices and seafood in Northern Kerala and has an average elevation of 2 metres (6 ft 7 in) above the sea level.

== History ==
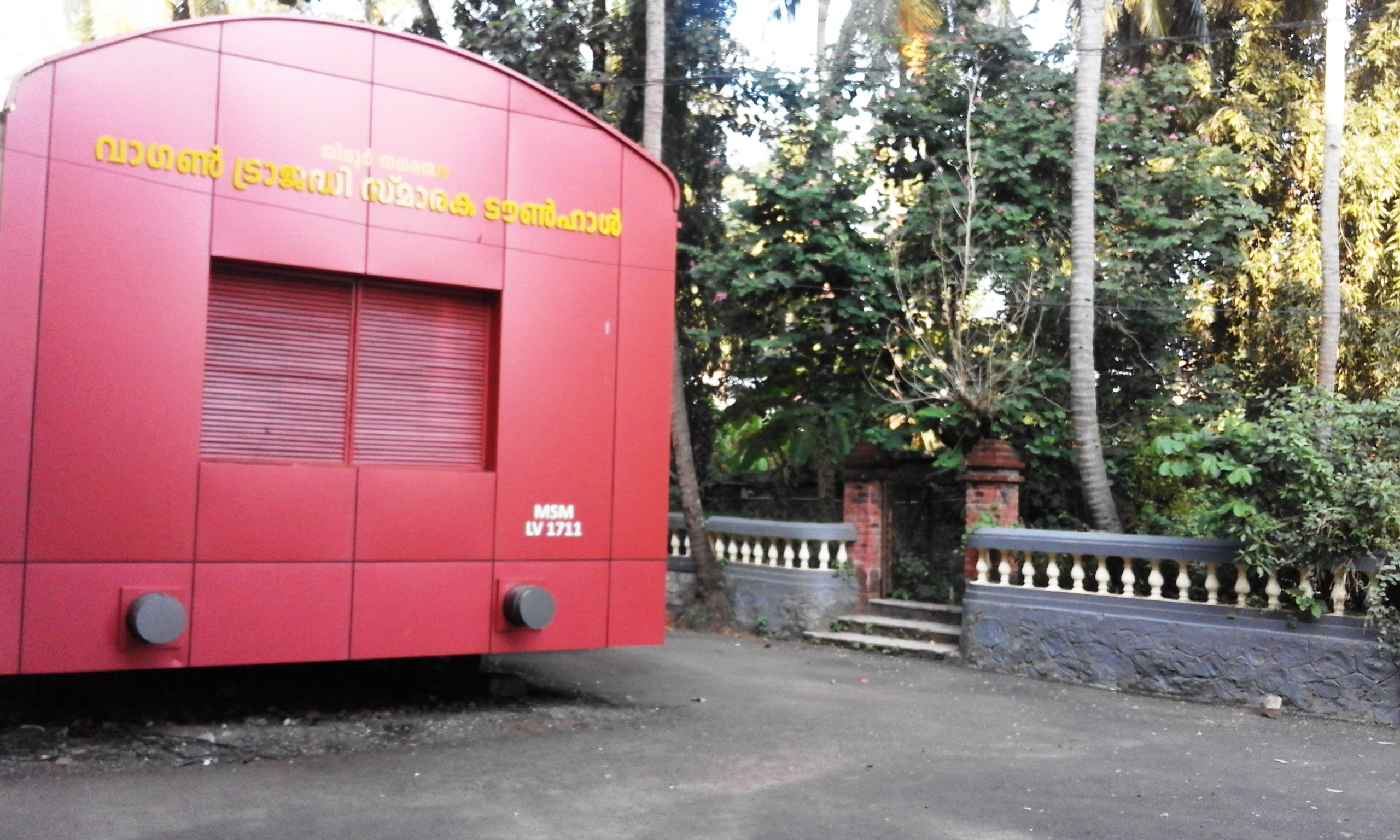
Wagon Tragedy Memorial Hall

The medieval Kerala school of astronomy and mathematics was mainly centred in and around present-day Tirur Taluk. Puthiyangadi region in Tirur served as the headquarters of the medieval feudal principality of Tanur, who were allied on various occasions to the Zamorins of Calicut, prior to the East India Company rule in the region (1792–1858) and subsequent British Raj (1858–1947). Tirur railway station, built in 1861, is the oldest railway station in Kerala.

== Demographics ==
As of 2001 India census, Tirur had a population of 53,650, of which 48% are male and 52% female. Tirur has an average literacy rate of 95%, higher than the national average of 71.0%: male literacy is 96%, and female literacy is 94%. In Tirur, 13% of the population is under six years of age. Tirur Assembly constituency is part of Ponnani (Lok Sabha constituency).

== Transportation ==
Tirur railway station

- Railway station: Tirur railway station is one of the major railway stations in northern Kerala. Almost every train stops here, connecting the district to the rest of the country. It is also the oldest railway station in the state. The first railway line in Kerala was established in 1861 from Beypore to Tirur. It is 19 miles long (30.5 km), which was commissioned by the southwest line of the Madras railway company.
- Road: Tirur is well connected to the other cities by road, even though no National Highway passes through the town. The Chamravattom bridge connects Kochi with Kozhikode. There are regular buses plying between Tirur and nearby major towns and cities like Malappuram, Ponnani, Manjeri, Puthanathani, Valanchery, Kuttippuram, Kottakkal, Tanur, Parappanangadi, Kozhikode, Guruvayur, Thrissur, Kochi, Thiruvananthapuram, Alappuzha, Kottayam, Coimbatore, Bangalore and all major cities. There are a few private buses offering overnight journeys to Bangalore.
- Nearest airport: Calicut International Airport is approximately 35 kilometres (22 mi) away.

== Educational institutions ==
There are many educational institutions in Tirur region.

Name	Type	Sector
Thunchath Ezhuthachan Malayalam University, Thunchan Parambu Tirur	University	Govt.
Thunchan Memorial Government College, Vakkad	Post Grad. College	Govt.
Cochin College of Engineering and Technology, Athippatta-Valanchery	Professional College	Self-financing
MES College of Engineering, Kuttippuram	Professional College	Self-financing
Ansar Arabic College (AAC), Valavannur	Post Grad. College	Government-Aided
SSUS Regional Centre Tirur, Thazhethara	Post-grad. College	Private
Kerala State Electronics Development Corporation (KELTRON) Knowledge Centre, Naduvilangadi	Professional	Govt.
Seethi Sahib Memorial Polytechnic College, Tirur	Polytechnic	Government-Aided
Food Craft Institute	Professional	Govt.
MDPS	ITI	Govt.
IHRD Extension Centre	Professional	Govt.
MES Central School, Tirur	High School	Private
Bharatiya Vidya Bhavan English School, Tirunavaya	High School	Private
MET High School, Alathiyur	High School	Private
NSS English School, Tirur	High School	Private
TIC Secondary School	High School	Private
Fathima Matha English School	High School	Private
JMHSS Tirur	High School	Private
K.H.M.H.S.S Alathiyur,	Higher secondary School	Aided
MET Tirur Central School	High School	Private
Bafakhy YatheemKhana Vocational Higher Secondary School, Valavannur, Kadungathukund	Higher Secondary School	Aided
MSM Higher Secondary School, Kallingaparamba	High School	Aided
Govt. HSS, Cheriyamundam	High School	Govt.
Govt. Girls HSS, B. P. Angadi	High School	Govt.
Govt. Boys HSS	High School	Govt.
Govt. HSS, Ezhur	High School	Govt.
Govt. HSS, Niramaruthur	High School	Govt.
NMHSS, Thirunavaya	High School	Private
GVHSS, Paravanna	High School	Govt.
Vallathol AUP School, Mangalam	Aided School	Aided
A.M.U.P School, Areekkad	UP School	Aided

Tirur Municipality

== Notable people from Tirur ==
=== Tirur region ===
- Abdurahiman Randathani - politician and former MLA.
- Achyutha Pisharadi - a Sanskrit grammarian, astronomer and mathematician.
- Adil Ibrahim - actor.
- Azad Moopen - doctor and businessman.
- B. M. Kutty - journalist.
- C. Radhakrishnan - writer and film director.
- Damodara Nambudiri - mathematician.
- Dileep K. Nair - Educationist.
- Govinda Bhattathiri - mathematician.
- Hemanth Menon - actor.
- K. V. Ramakrishnan, poet.
- Kalamandalam Kalyanikutty Amma - Resurrector of Mohiniyattam.
- Kurukkoli Moideen, Politician and MLA.
- Kuttikrishna Marar - literary critic.
- Malayath Appunni - poet and children's writer.
- Melpathur Narayana Bhattathiri - mathematician and Sanskrit poet.
- Mohammed Irshad - Footballer.
- Mohamed Salah - footballer.
- N. Samsudheen - Politician and MLA.
- P. Nandakumar - Politician and MLA.
- Parameshvara Nambudiri - mathematician.
- Pulapre Balakrishnan - Economist and Educationalist.
- Ranjith Padinhateeri - biological physicist.
- Ravi Vallathol - actor.
- Salman Kalliyath - Footballer.
- Sadheer Ali Tirur - Poet and Politician.
- T. M. Nair - Political activist.
- Thunchaththu Ezhuthachan - poet.
- Tirur Nambissan - Kathakali singer.
- V. Abdurahiman - Minister of Kerala.
- Vaidyaratnam Triprangode Moossad - physician.
- Vallathol Narayana Menon - poet.
- Vijayan - actor.

=== Kottakkal region ===
- Vaidyaratnam P. S. Warrier - physician.
- K C Manorama Thampuratti (eminent Sanskrit poet)
- K. C. Manavedan Raja (Zamorin of Calicut during 1932–1937)
- M. K. Vellodi (Indian civil servant, diplomat, former Cabinet Secretary)
- Dr. K. C. K. E Raja, former Vice Chancellor Kerala University and Director General of Health Services.
- Sangita Madhavan Nair, Actress
- U. A. Beeran
- Jayasree Kalathil, Researcher.
- P. K. Warrier
- Kottakkal Sivaraman (eminent Kathakali artist)
- V. C. Balakrishna Panicker
- Kottakkal Madhu (Kathakali singer)
- M. P. Abdussamad Samadani (politician, MLA, former Member of Parliament)
- Sachin Warrier (playback singer and composer)

=== Valanchery region ===
- Azhvanchery Thamprakkal - Former feudal lords.
- K T Jaleel, politician and former minister.
- Zakariya Mohammed, director, scriptwriter and actor.
- Unni Menon, playback singer.
- Shweta Menon, actress.
- Aneesh G. Menon, actor.
- Edasseri Govindan Nair, poet.
- K. V. Ramakrishnan, poet.
- Iqbal Kuttippuram, Screenwriter.
- Kuttippuram Kesavan Nair, poet.
- M. T. Vasudevan Nair, poet.
- V. P. Sanu, politician.
- Ahmad Kutty, North American professor.
- Faisal Kutty, Lawyer, law professor, public speaker, orator.

== Gallery ==
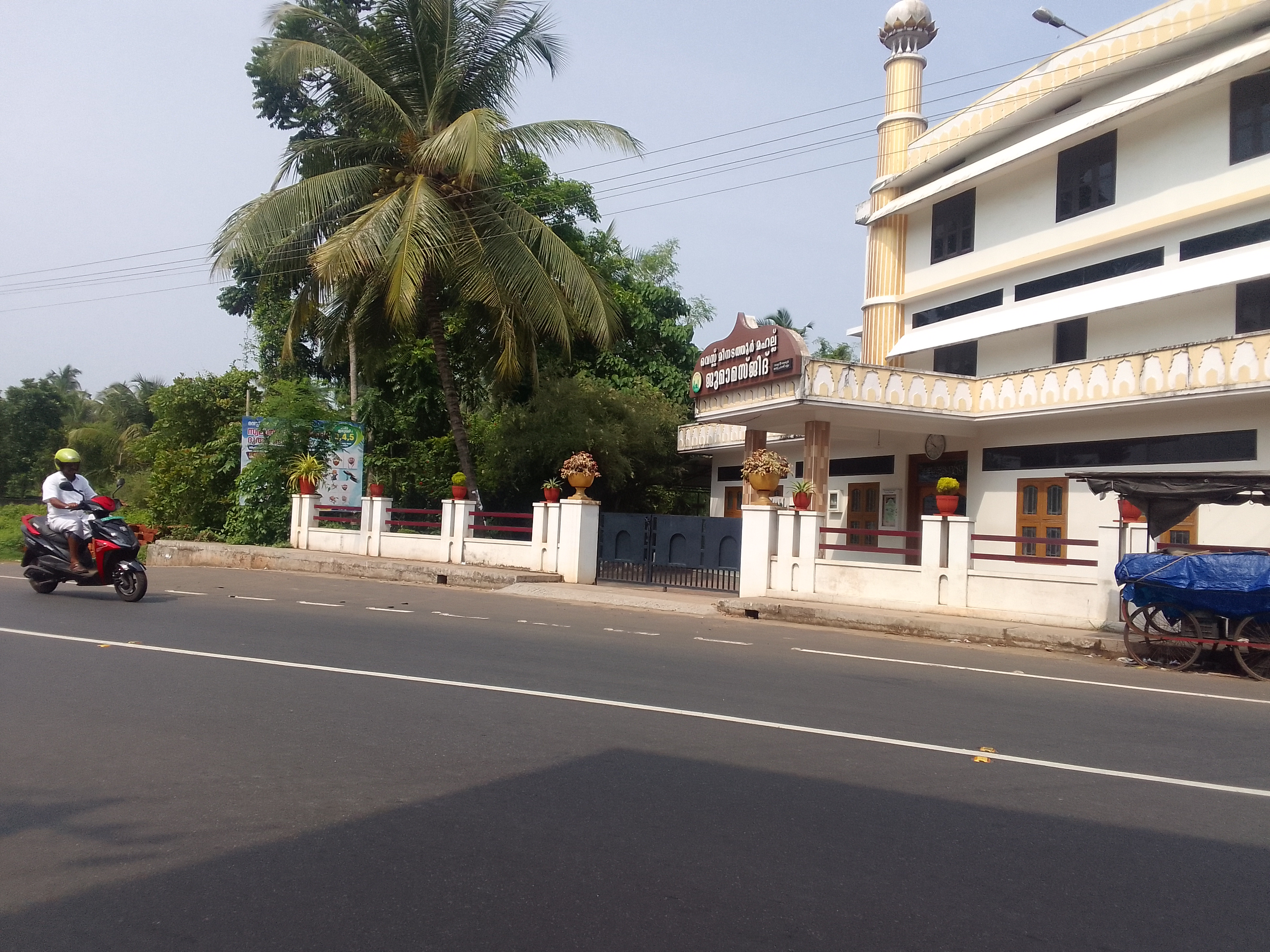

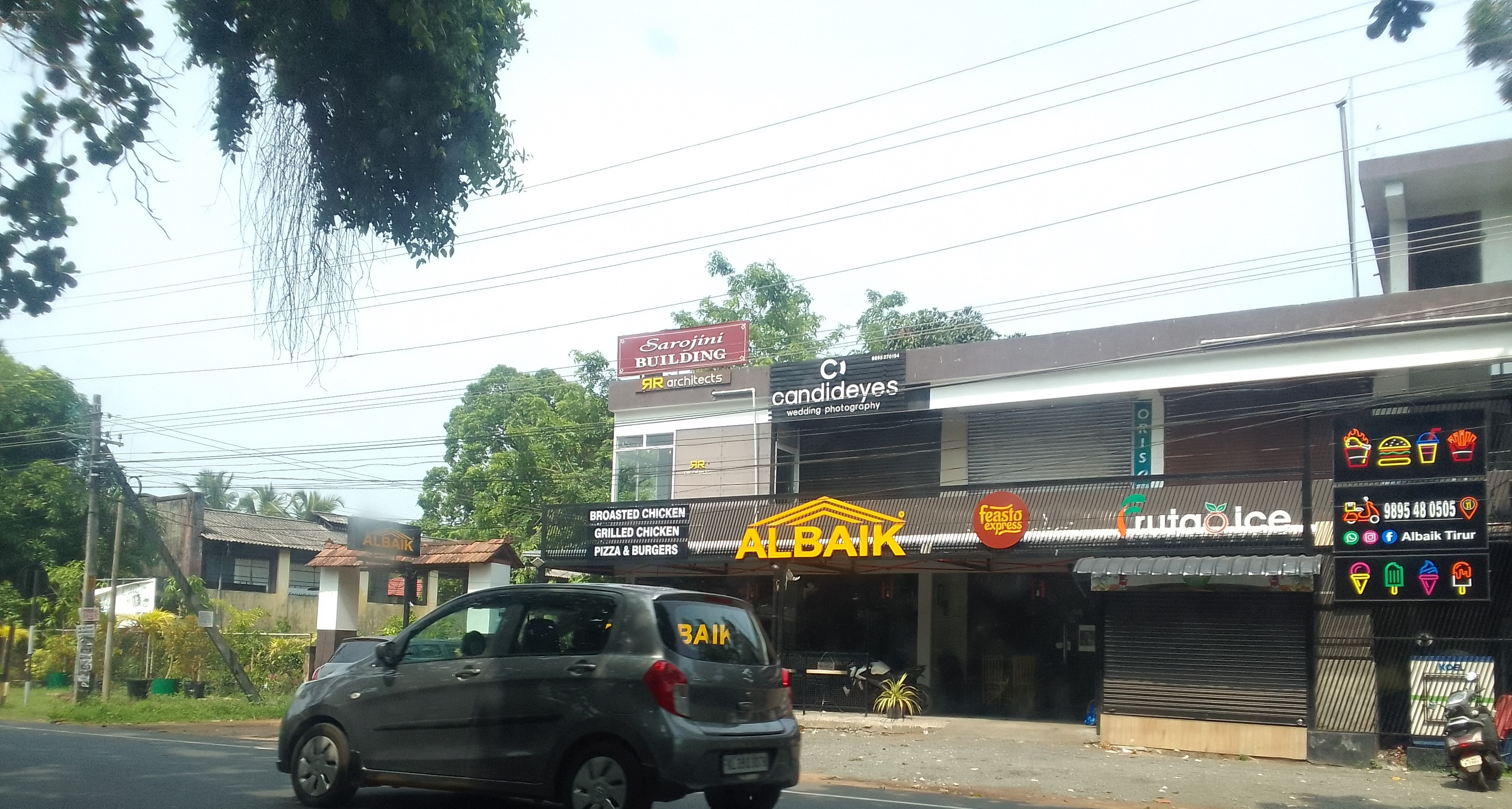

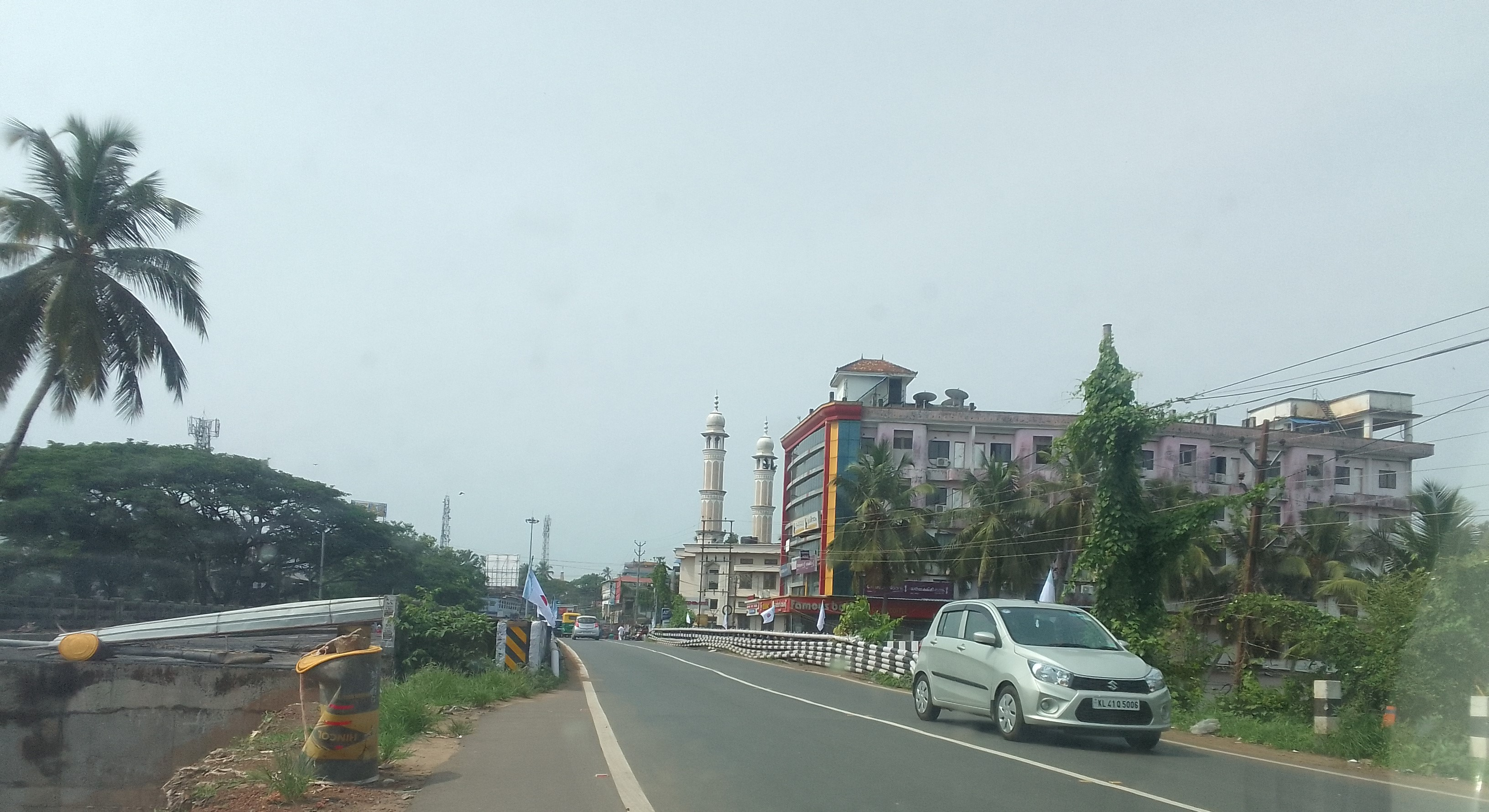

== See also ==
- Ayyaya
- Niramarutur
- Padinjarekkara Beach
- Puthiyakadpuram
- Tunchan Parambil
- Thunchath Ezhuthachan Malayalam University
- Vairankode Vela
