= Azad Moopen =

Indian physician (born 15 April 1953)

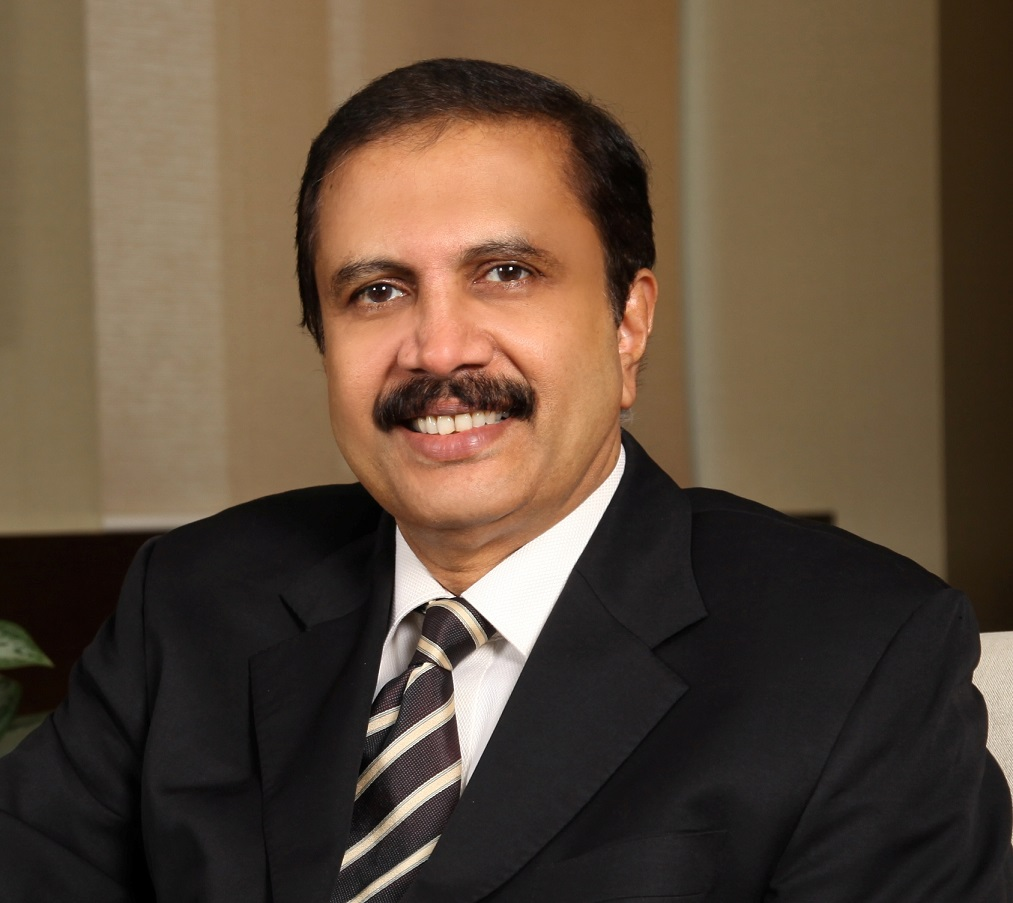
- Born: 28 July 1953 (age 73); Kalpakanchery, Malappuram district, Kerala, India
- Education: Government Medical College, Kozhikode; Delhi University
- Occupations: Businessman; Doctor; Investor
- Board member of: Aster DM Healthcare (Chairman and Managing Director); NORKA-Roots (Director); National Committee on Healthcare (Chairman); Confederation of Indian Industry (3. Chairman); Indian Business and Professional Council (IBPC) Dubai (Governing Board Member); Abu Dhabi University (Member, Executive Advisory Board); Social Advancement Foundation of India (SAFI)(Executive Committee Member); All Kerala Medical Graduates Association (AKMG) UAE (Founder President)
- Awards: Pravasi Bharatiya Samman (2010); Padma Shri (2011)

Azad Moopen (born 15 April 1953) is an Indian healthcare entrepreneur. He is the developer of many healthcare facilities in Asia-Pacific. He is also the chairman and managing director of Aster DM Healthcare, a healthcare conglomerate in the Middle East and India founded in 1987.

== Early life and education ==
Azad Moopen was born on 28 July 1953 in the Indian village Kalpakanchery in Malappuram district of Kerala. He was son of Late Mandayapurath Ahmed Unni Moopen, a noble, freedom fighter and social leader. He did his Primary School education from GVHSS Kalpakanchery, Azad Moopen is a gold medalist in MBBS and a Post Graduate in General Medicine from Government Medical College, Kozhikode in Kerala. He is also a Diploma holder in Chest Diseases from Delhi University India.

=== Family ===
Moopen is married to Naseera Azad and has three daughters - Alisha Moopen, Ziham Moopen and Zeba Moopen.

== Career ==
Moopen started his career in 1982 as a Medical Lecturer at Government Medical College, Kozhikode but decided to relocate to Dubai in 1987.

Starting with a single-doctor clinic in Dubai in 1987, Aster DM Healthcare grew into a global healthcare conglomerate of more than 377 facilities spread across eight countries in a span of 34 years.

Aster DM Healthcare is one of the largest integrated healthcare service providers in the GCC and India. Along with providing medical care to millions across many countries, Aster DM Healthcare now provides direct employment to more than 20,500 people which includes approximately 2,998 doctors and counting.

=== Healthcare development in India ===
Moopen has been involved in the development of healthcare facilities in India. MIMS hospitals directly employ about 3,000 people.

He participated in establishing the 600-bed tertiary care Malabar Institute of Medical Sciences (MIMS) hospital at Kozhikode in Kerala in 2001. This was the first multi-specialty hospital in India to receive National Accreditation Board for Hospitals & Healthcare Providers accreditation in 2007. The second 150-bed MIMS hospital was set up at Kottakkal in Malappuram district in 2009.

MIMS Charitable Trust under his leadership established a rural health centre at the backward Vazhayur Panchayat in Malappuram district in 2008 and adopted 7,000 BPL members for comprehensive free out-patient and in-patient care. The trust is adopting the BPL population in the three wards around MIMS in the Corporation of Kozhikode and also plans to conduct a breast and cervical cancer screening programme.

=== Other activities ===
Moopen was the Gulf area convener of the Malabar Airport Development Action Committee, which spearheaded the efforts for the establishment of Kozhikode International Airport through a public–private partnership initiative in the 1990s. This is the first airport set up with such private participation in the country. He is the founding chairman of the Association of Kerala Medical Graduates and the Association of Indian Muslims in the UAE. He is also one of the promoters of Credence High School, Dubai, a secondary school he co-founded along with others in 2014.

Moopen is the vice chairman of the Social Advancement Foundation of India. He is involved with the charities Aster DM Foundation and Dr. Moopen Family Foundation.

== IPO listing ==
In February 2018, Aster DM Healthcare announced its initial Public Offer IPO and had fixed a price Rs 180 to Rs 190 for the public offer. Azad Moopen believes the company will take a decision later to seek listing on other exchanges like London or Dubai.

== Awards and recognitions ==
- Padma Shri Award by the Government of India (2011)
- Pravasi Bharatiya Samman by the Government of India (2010)
- Arab Health Award for "Outstanding Contribution of an Individual to the Middle East Healthcare Industry" (2010)
- Best Doctor Award by the Government of Kerala (2009)
- Dubai Service Excellence Award (2004) by the Government of Dubai, United Arab Emirates for the Group
- Kerala Ratna Award by Keraleeyam presented by Shri K G Balakrishnan, Hon. Chief Justice of India, in New Delhi (2008) (Section - Reports 2008–2009)
- Aslam Kshema Award by Kshema Foundation for outstanding effort to help economically deprived people (2009)
- Lifetime Achievement Award by FICCI Healthcare Excellence Awards (2018)
- Honored with the 'Lifetime Achievement Award' at the 9th Entrepreneur India Awards in 2019
- Received the 'Visionary CEO of the Year Award' in recognition of his contribution at the CEO Middle East Awards by Arabian Business in 2019
- Awarded with a fellowship of the Royal College of Physicians (FRCP), UK in 2019, for his significant contribution to the medical and healthcare profession.
- Honored with the 'Lifetime Achievement Award' at the Gulf Indian Leadership Summit in 2018
- Recognized as one of the '100 Most Inspiring Leaders in the Middle East' by Arabian Business Magazine in 2018
- Listed #6 in the 'Top 100 Indian Business Leaders in UAE' by Forbes in 2017
- Arabian Business Achievement Award from the ITP Publishing Group in 2010

== See also ==
- Aster DM Healthcare
