= Aster MIMS =

Hospital in Kozhikode, Kerala, India

Geography
- Location: Mini Bypass Road, Opp Kovilakam Residency Govindapuram, Kozhikode, Kerala, India, India
- Coordinates: 11°14′45.2″N 75°47′53.34″E

Organisation
- Type: General

History
- Opened: 2001; 25 years ago as MIMS in 2015; 11 years ago rebranded as Aster MIMS

Links
- Website: Aster MIMS Calicut, Aster MIMS Kannur, Aster MIMS Kottakkal
- Lists: Hospitals in India

Aster Malabar Institute of Medical Sciences (Aster MIMS) is a super-specialty hospital located in Kozhikode, Kerala, India. A NABH-accredited hospital, Aster MIMS was established to offer advanced medical treatment of international standards at affordable rates. MIMS has also established a 425-bed super speciality hospital in Chala, Kannur and 200-bed hospital at Kottakkal.

It was the first multi-specialty hospital in the country to gain NABH accreditation.

== Key people ==
- Dr Azad Moopen, Chairman
- SM Syed Khalil, Director
- Dr. Abdulla Cherayakkat, Managing Director
- Mr. U Basheer, executive director.

There are over 1500 employees.
