= Tirur Assembly constituency =

Constituency of the Kerala legislative assembly in India

Tirur
- Constituency No. 45 for the Kerala Legislative Assembly
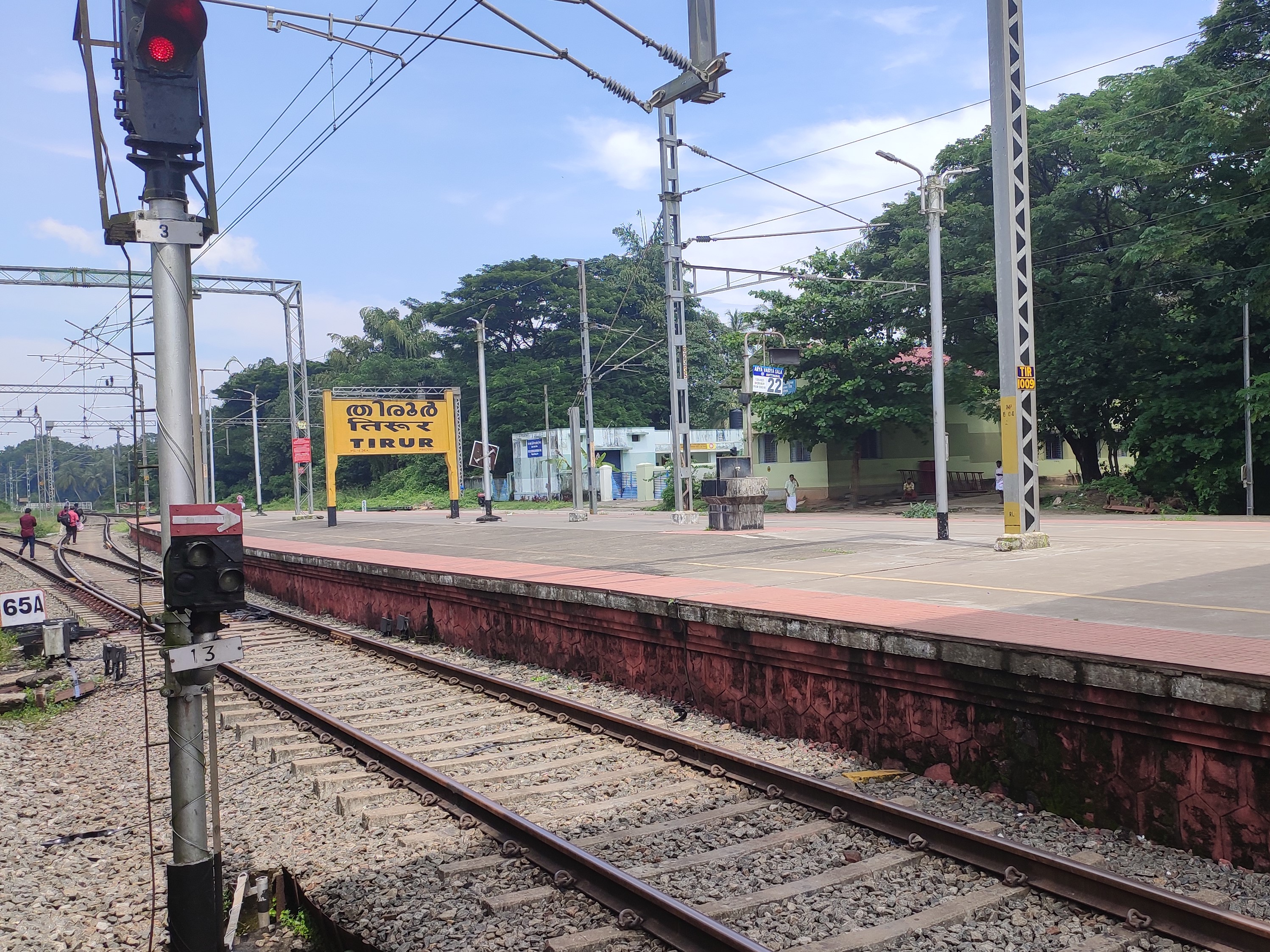
- Tirur railway station, the oldest railway station in Kerala (1861)

Constituency details
- Country: India
- Region: South India
- State: Kerala
- District: Malappuram
- Established: 1951
- Total electors: 2,05,287 (2016), 2,55,441 (2026)
- Reservation: None

Member of Legislative Assembly
- 16th Kerala Legislative Assembly
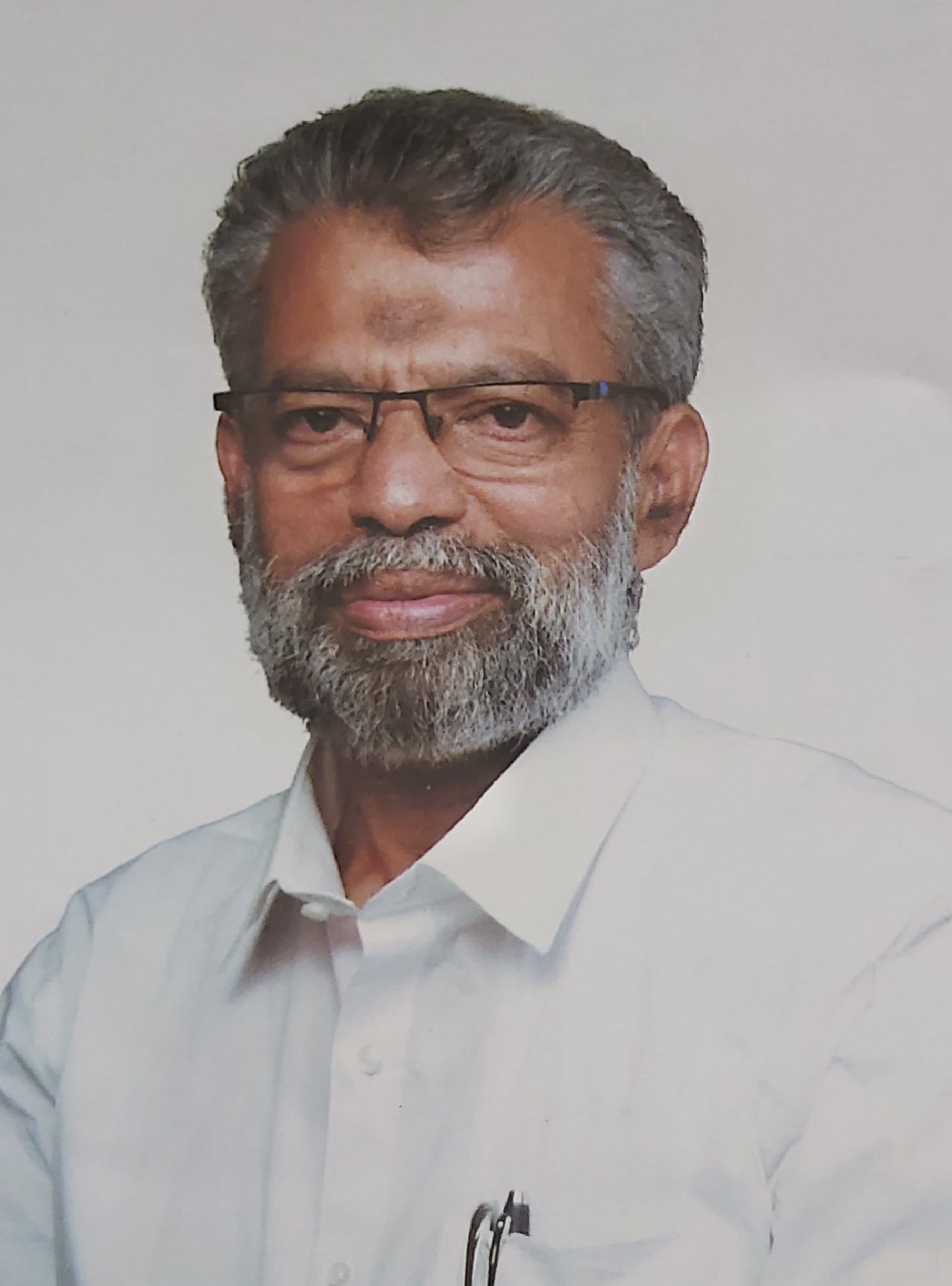
- Incumbent Kurukkoli Moideen
- Party: IUML
- Alliance: UDF
- Elected year: 2026

Tirur State assembly constituency is one of the 140 state legislative assembly constituencies in Kerala in southern India. It is also one of the seven state legislative assembly constituencies included in Ponnani Lok Sabha constituency. As of the 2026 Assembly elections, the current MLA is Kurukkoli Moideen of IUML.

== Local self-governed segments ==
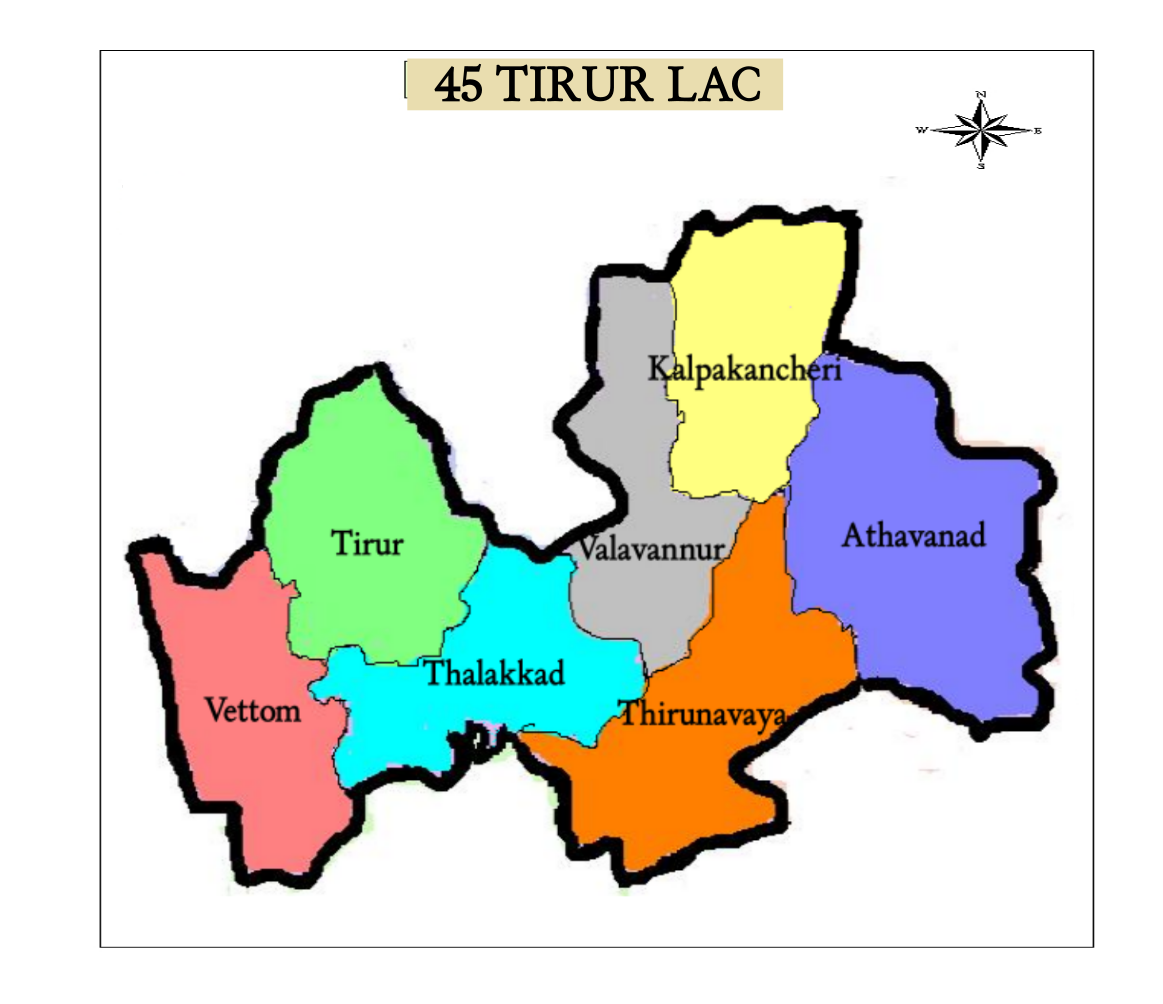
Map of Tirur Assembly constituency

Tirur Assembly constituency is composed of the following local self-governed segments:

| Sl no. | Name | Status (Grama panchayat/Municipality) | Taluk |
|---|---|---|---|
| 1 | Tirur | Municipality | Tirur |
| 2 | Valavannur | Grama panchayat | Tirur |
| 3 | Kalpakanchery | Grama panchayat | Tirur |
| 4 | Vettom | Grama panchayat | Tirur |
| 5 | Thalakkad | Grama panchayat | Tirur |
| 6 | Thirunavaya | Grama panchayat | Tirur |
| 7 | Athavanad | Grama panchayat | Tirur |

Tirur Assembly constituency

== Members of Legislative Assembly ==
The following list contains all members of Kerala Legislative Assembly who have represented Tirur Assembly constituency during the period of various assemblies:

| Year | Member | Political party |
|---|---|---|
| 1957 | K. Moideenkutty Haji | Indian Union Muslim League |
| 1960 | K. Moideenkutty Haji | Indian Union Muslim League |
| 1967 | K. Moideenkutty Haji | Indian Union Muslim League |
| 1970 | K. M. Kutty | Indian Union Muslim League |
| 1977 | P. T. Kunhi Mohammed | Indian Union Muslim League |
| 1980 | P. T. Kunhi Mohammed | Indian Union Muslim League |
| 1982 | P. T. Kunhi Mohammed | Indian Union Muslim League |
| 1987 | K. Moideenkutty Haji | Indian Union Muslim League |
| 1991 | E. T. Muhammed Basheer | Indian Union Muslim League |
| 1996 | E. T. Muhammed Basheer | Indian Union Muslim League |
| 2001 | E. T. Muhammed Basheer | Indian Union Muslim League |
| 2006 | P. P. Abdullakkutty | Communist Party of India (Marxist) |
| 2011 | C. Mammutty | Indian Union Muslim League |
| 2016 | C. Mammutty | Indian Union Muslim League |
| 2021 | Kurukkoli Moideen | Indian Union Muslim League |
| 2026 | Kurukkoli Moideen | Indian Union Muslim League |

== Election results ==
Percentage change (±%) denotes the change in the number of votes from the immediate previous election.

2026 Kerala Legislative Assembly election: Tirur
| Party | Candidate | Votes | % | ±% |
|---|---|---|---|---|
| IUML | Kurukkoli Moideen | 106,108 | 53.45 | ▲5.24 |
| CPI(M) | V. Abdurahiman | 81,971 | 41.29 | ▼2.69 |
| BJP | K. Narayanan Master | 8,634 | 4.35 | ▼0.98 |
| NOTA | None of the above | 608 | 0.31 | ▲0.07 |
| AAP | Kabeer Alias Shameer Kuttur | 340 | | |
| Independent | Moideen Koomulli Parambil | 312 | | |
| SUCI(C) | Dr. S. Aleena | 224 | | |
| Independent | Abdurahiman S/o Kunjeen | 130 | | |
| Socialist | Siyad Koodiyath | 125 | | |
| Independent | Abdurahiman S/o Kunjava | 57 | | |
| Margin of victory | | 24,137 | 12.16 | ▲7.93 |
| Turnout | | 1,98,509 | 77.71 | ▲3.30 |
| IUML hold | | Swing | ▲3.97 | |

=== 2021 ===
2021 Kerala Legislative Assembly election: Tirur
| Party | Candidate | Votes | % | ±% |
|---|---|---|---|---|
| IUML | Kurukkoli Moideen | 82,314 | 48.21% | ▲2.00 |
| LDF | Gafoor P. Lillis | 75,100 | 43.98% | ▲1.3 |
| BJP | Abdul Salam | 9,097 | 5.33%% | ▼0.41 |
| SDPI | Ashraf | 2,712 | 1.9% | ▲0.96 |
| Independent | Moideen Meenthrathakath | 477 | 0.28% | N/A |
| NOTA | None of the above | 417 | 0.24% | N/A |
| Margin of victory | | 7,214 | 4.93% | ▲14.14 |
| Turnout | | 1,70,742 | 78.36% | ▲2.38 |
| IUML hold | | Swing | ▲2.00 | |

=== 2016 ===
There were 2,05,287 registered voters in Tirur Assembly constituency for the 2016 Kerala Assembly election.

==== By political party ====
2016 Kerala Legislative Assembly election: Tirur
| Party | Candidate | Votes | % | ±% |
|---|---|---|---|---|
| IUML | C. Mammutty | 73,432 | 46.85% | ▼8.00 |
| LDF | Gafoor P. Lillis | 66,371 | 42.34% | ▲6.14 |
| BJP | M. K. Devidasan | 9,083 | 5.79% | ▲1.40 |
| WPOI | Ganesh Vaderi | 2,001 | 1.28% | N/A |
| SDPI | Ibrahim Tirur | 1,828 | 1.17% | ▼0.96 |
| PDP | Adv. Shameer Payyanangadi | 1,276 | 0.81% | ▼0.62 |
| Independent | E. K. Gafoor | 791 | 0.50% | N/A |
| NOTA | None of the above | 692 | 0.44% | N/A |
| Margin of victory | | 7,061 | 4.51% | ▼14.14 |
| Turnout | | 1,56,754 | 76.36% | ▲0.38 |
| IUML hold | | Swing | ▼8.00 | |

==== By local self-governed segment ====
The results of the 2016 Assembly election by local self-governed segment is as follows:

| No. | Segment | UDF Votes | | LDF Votes | | NDA Votes | | Lead | Alliance | Margin | |
|---|---|---|---|---|---|---|---|---|---|---|---|
| 1 | Valavannur | 8602 | 46.30% | 8096 | 43.58% | 999 | 5.38% | C. Mammutty | UDF | 506 | 2.72% |
| 2 | Kalpakanchery | 9739 | 54.21% | 7015 | 39.05% | 269 | 1.50% | C. Mammutty | UDF | 2724 | 15.16% |
| 3 | Tirur | 14457 | 46.08% | 13531 | 43.13% | 2078 | 6.62% | C. Mammutty | UDF | 926 | 2.95% |
| 4 | Vettom | 9700 | 45.53% | 8674 | 40.72% | 1892 | 8.88% | C. Mammutty | UDF | 1026 | 4.81% |
| 5 | Thalakkad | 7896 | 39.94% | 9041 | 45.73% | 1702 | 8.61% | Gafoor P. Lillis | LDF | 1145 | 5.79% |
| 6 | Tirunavaya | 12022 | 48.44% | 10382 | 41.83% | 985 | 3.97% | C. Mammutty | UDF | 1640 | 6.61% |
| 7 | Athavanad | 10813 | 48.04% | 9414 | 41.83% | 1146 | 5.09% | C. Mammutty | UDF | 1399 | 6.21% |
| TOTAL | | 73432 | 46.85% | 66371 | 42.34% | 9083 | 5.79% | C. Mammutty | UDF | 7061 | 4.51% |

=== 2011 ===
There were 1,66,314 registered voters in Tirur Assembly constituency for the 2011 Kerala Assembly election.

2011 Kerala Legislative Assembly election: Tirur
| Party | Candidate | Votes | % | ±% |
|---|---|---|---|---|
| IUML | C. Mammutty | 69,305 | 54.85% | |
| CPI(M) | P. P. Abdullakutty | 45,739 | 36.20% | |
| BJP | P. T. Ali Haji | 5,543 | 4.39% | |
| SDPI | A. K. Majeed Master | 2,696 | 2.13% | |
| PDP | Alikutty Alias Bappu Puthanathani | 1,802 | 1.43% | |
| Independent | Mohandas | 781 | 0.62% | |
| BSP | T. Ayyappan | 487 | 0.38% | |
| Margin of victory | | 23,566 | 18.65% | |
| Turnout | | 1,26,353 | 75.98% | |
| IUML gain from CPI(M) | | Swing | | |

=== 1952 ===
1952 Madras Legislative Assembly election: Tirur
| Party | Candidate | Votes | % | ±% |
|---|---|---|---|---|
| IUML | K. Uppi Saheb | 17,088 | 41.89% | |
| INC | K. Ahmad Kutty | 14,715 | 36.08% | 36.08% |
| CPI | K. Damodaran | 6,438 | 15.78% | |
| Socialist Party (India) | E. Raman Menon | 2,547 | 6.24% | |
| Margin of victory | | 2,373 | 5.82% | |
| Turnout | | 40,788 | 47.11% | |
| Registered electors | | 86,582 | | |
| IUML win (new seat) | | | | |

== See also ==
- Tirur Municipality
- Malappuram district
- List of constituencies of the Kerala Legislative Assembly
- 2016 Kerala Legislative Assembly election
