= Mangalam, Tirur =

Mangalam
- Village
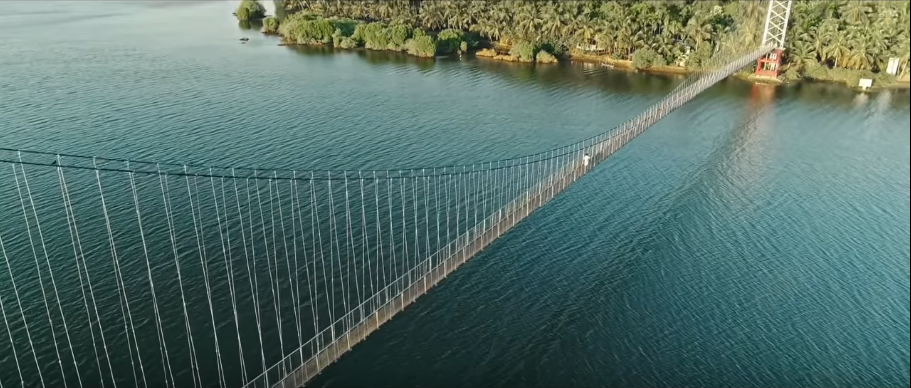
- Kootayi hanging bridge

- Location in Kerala, India Mangalam (India) Mangalam (Asia)
- Coordinates: 10.845°N 75.919°E
- Country: India
- State: Kerala
- District: Malappuram
- Panchayat formation: 30 September 2000; 25 years ago

Government
  - Type: Grama Panchayat
  - Body: Mangalam Grama Panchayat
  - President: CP Kunjutty
  - Vice president: K Pathummakutty

Area
  - Total: 12.12 km^{2} (4.68 sq mi)

Population (2011)
  - Total: 33,442
  - Density: 2,759/km^{2} (7,150/sq mi)

Languages
  - Official: Malayalam

2011 Census
  - Sex ratio (2011): 1123 ♀/1000♂
  - Literacy (2011): 91.51%
- Time zone: UTC+5:30 (IST)
- PIN: 676561, 676562
- Telephone code: 0494
- Vehicle registration: KL-55
- Nearest towns: Tirur

Mangalam is a coastal village in Tirur Taluk, Malappuram district, Kerala, India. The village is located 9 kilometres (5.6 mi) south-west to the town of Tirur, 16 kilometres (9.9 mi) away from Ponnani, and 17 kilometres (11 mi) south to Tanur. Kootayi, known for its picturesque beach, is an important town in the jurisdiction of Mangalam Grama Panchayat.

== History ==
Mangalam was a part of the Vettathunad in the medieval period, like most of the other villages in the Tirur Taluk. Vettathunad, also known as the Kingdom of Tanur, was a coastal city-state kingdom in the Malabar Coast. It was ruled by the Vettathu Raja, who was a dependent of the Zamorin of Calicut. Vettathunad was known for its trade relationship with the Arab merchants in the medieval period. The Kshatriya family of the Vettathu Rajas became extinct with the death of the last Raja on 24 May 1793. It was a part of the Malabar District during the British rule. Vallathol Narayana Menon, a renowned Malayalam poet, was born at Mangalam. The family of Mohammed Abdur Rahiman also traces back to here.

Mangalam Grama Panchayat, the local administrative body of the region, was formed on 30 September 2000 by bifurcating the Vettom Grama Panchayath.

== Geography ==
Mangalam is located at 10.845°N 75.919°E. The Tirur River, which flows through the village, divides the village into two parts - the coastal Kootayi on the western part and the Mangalam-Chennara town on the eastern part. Kootayi is better known for its beach and is one of the major fishing centres in the district. Mangroves are seen in the coastal area.

== Demography ==
As of the 2011 India census, Mangalam had a population of 33,442 with 15,754 males and 17,688 females. The literacy rate of the village in 2011 was 91.51%. Malayalam is the most spoken language. Mangalam has been a multi-ethnic and multi-religious town since the early medieval period.

== Transportation ==
- Railway Station: The Tirur railway station is just 9 kilometres (5.6 mi) away from the town. Almost every train stops here.
- Road: Mangalam is well connected to the other cities by road through the Tirur town. There are regular buses plying between Tirur and cities like Malappuram, Kozhikode, Ernakulam, Guruvayur, Thrissur, Kochi, Trivandrum, Alappuzha, Kottayam, Coimbatore, Bangalore and all major cities. There are a few private buses offering over night journey to Bangalore.
- Nearest Airport: The Karipur International Airport is approximately 43 kilometres (27 mi) away.

== Civic administration ==
The region is administered by the Mangalam Grama Panchayat. It is composed of 20 wards. The Panchayat is bounded by Vettom and Thalakkad to the north, Triprangode to the east, Purathur to the south and Arabian Sea to the west. Hajara Majeed of IUML was the last president, and A. K. Saleem who belongs to Congress was the vice-president in the Panchayat. Mangalam comes under Thavanur (State Assembly constituency), which comes under the Ponnani (Lok Sabha constituency).

Mangalam Grama Panchayat

Mangalam Local body election (2020)
Ward	Name	Party	Alliance	Member
1	Ashanpadi	IUML	UDF	P. P. Sabeeb Master
2	Pulluni North	CPI(M)	LDF	Saleem Pasha
3	Pulluni South	Ind.	OTH	Muhammad Basheer
4	Thottiyilangadi	IUML	UDF	K. T. Rafi Master
5	Mangalam South	CPI(M)	LDF	Nisha Rajeev
6	Punnamana	Ind.	UDF	Subaida Saheer
7	Chennara West	INC	UDF	Pathummakutty. K
8	Chennara East	CPI(M)	LDF	Sabitha Soman
9	Valamaruthur West	CPI(M)	LDF	P. Vasudevan
10	Valamaruthur East	INC	UDF	Arifa Kavungal
11	Kavanchery	IUML	UDF	Mathoor Noorjahan
12	Kurumbadi	IUML	UDF	Sabna
13	Perunthiruthi East	IUML	UDF	Kunhutty
14	Perunthiruthi West	INC	UDF	Ibrahimkutty
15	Kootayi South	CPI(M)	LDF	Nafeesamol Marakkare Purakkal
16	Kootayi Town	IUML	UDF	Ramla Teacher
17	Kootayi West	CPI(M)	LDF	Sameena. K
18	Arayan Kadappuram	IUML	UDF	Balan
19	Kootayi Paris	Ind.	OTH	Zainul Abideen Arayante Purakkal
20	Kootayi North	IUML	UDF	Ismayil Pattath

=== Law and Order ===
The Mangalam village comes under the jurisdiction of Tirur Police Station, which started functioning on 1 May 1963. T. P. Farshad is the present Inspector of the Tirur police station.

== Notable people ==
- Vallathol Narayana Menon
- Mohammed Abdur Rahiman (the roots of his family comes to Mangalam)

== See also ==
- Chamravattam
- Ponnani
- Purathur
- Tirur
- Triprangode
- Vettom
