= Kingdom of Tanur =

Medieval kingdom in southwest India

Kingdom of Tanur Vettathunad (Malayalam) Tanur Swaroopam (Malayalam) Prakashabhu (Sanskrit) Kingdom of Light (English)
- Before 12th century CE–1793
- Capital: Tanur; Bettathu Pudiyangadi (B. P. Angadi); 10.97°N 75.87°E
- Common languages: Malayalam
- Government: Kingdom
- History
  - Established: Before 12th century CE
  - Death of last Raja: 24 May 1793
- Today part of: Malappuram, Kerala, India

The Kingdom of Tanur (also referred to as Vettathunadu, Vettam, Tanur Swaroopam, and Prakashabhu; or the Kingdom of Light) was a feudal principality on the Malabar Coast of the Indian subcontinent during the Middle Ages. It was governed by the Tanur dynasty, a Hindu ruling family that claimed Kshatriya status. The kingdom encompassed parts of the coastal taluks of Tirurangadi, Tirur, and Ponnani in present-day Malappuram district, including locations such as Tanur, Tirur (historically known as Trikkandiyur) and Chaliyam. The kingdom also contained the coastal villages of Kadalundi and Chaliyam in the southernmost region of Kozhikode district.

The rulers of Vettathunadu were long-standing feudatories of the Zamorin of Calicut. With the arrival of the Portuguese on the Malabar Coast, the Vettathunadu kings began to manoeuvre between the Portuguese and the Zamorin. They were among the first vassals of Calicut to stand up against the Zamorin with Portuguese support. In 1546, Francis Xavier visited Tanur and the Keraladeshpuram Temple located there.

In 1549, a ruler of Vettathunadu converted to Christianity under Portuguese influence. This conversion marked a shift in the kingdom's alliance, allowing the Portuguese to construct a fortress at Chaliyam.

In the 17th century, the Queen of Cochin adopted some Vettathunadu princes. This adoption included parts of the Chovvaram (Sukapuram) village, which was one of the 64 historic villages of Nambudiris. The adoption contributed to tensions among the regional powers and principalities.

The Tanur royal family became extinct following the death of the last king on 24 May 1793. Afterwards, the kingdom came under control of the English East India Company. In 1842, the temple associated with the royal family was transferred to the Zamorin of Calicut, marking the end of the kingdom's independent identity.

The Vettathunadu rulers were renowned patrons of arts and learning. A Vettathunadu ruler is credited with introducing innovations toKathakali, which have come to be known as the Vettathu Sambradayam ('Vettathu tradition'). The region was also the birthplace of the famous poets Thunchaththu Ramanujan Ezhuthachan, celebrated as "the father of modern Malayalam", and Vallathol Narayana Menon, the founder of Kerala Kalamandalam.

The Kerala school of astronomy and mathematics flourished between the 14th and 16th centuries. Scholars from the school made significant advancements in addressing astronomical problems and independently developed a number of important mathematical concepts, including series expansion for trigonometric functions.

== Etymology and dominions ==
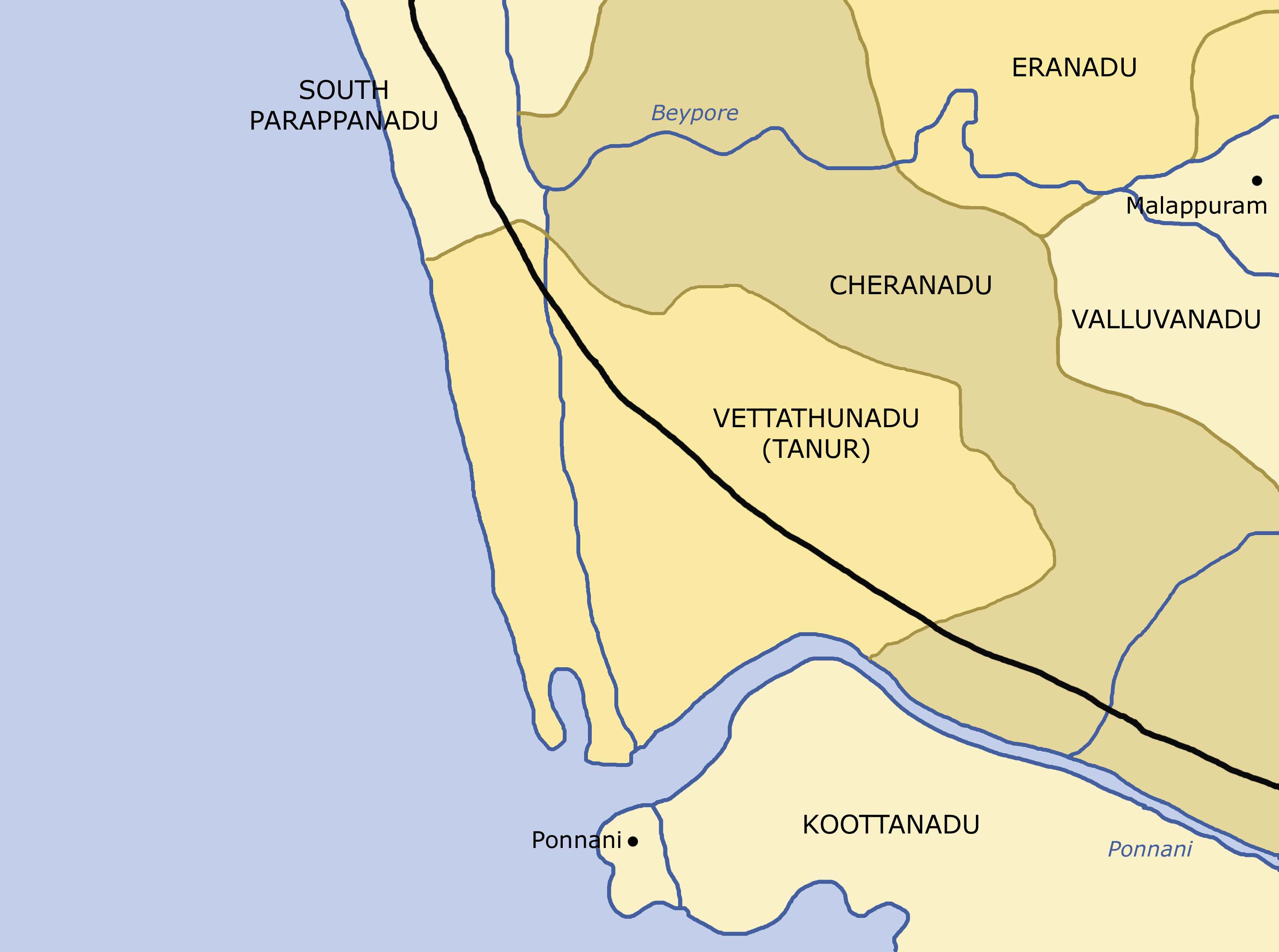
Erstwhile Vettathunadu Taluk in the Malabar District during British rule. It was merged with Ponnani Taluk in 1861; it later separated to form Tirur Taluk in 1957.

The name Tanur Swaroopam (Tanni-ur Swaroopam) is derived from three words in the Malayalam language: tanni refers to the tree bastard myrobalan, ur translates to "village", and swaroopam to "kingdom". In literary works, the kingdom is often referred to as Prakasa Bhu ('The Kingdom of Light'), and its ruler as Prakasa Bhu Palan. The king of Tanur Swaroopam was addressed raja, thampuran, or naduvazhi.

During the British arrival, the Kingdom of Tanur ('nadu') was divided into 21 administrative divisions called amsoms as documented by William Logan. Each amsom often had a central bazaar. The divisions were as follows:

- Anantavur (Cherulal)
- Chennara
- Clari (Kuttippala)
- Iringavur
- Kalpakanchēri (Kadungathukundu)
- Kanmanam (Thuvvakkad)
- Mangalam
- Mēlmuri
- Niramaruthūr
- Ozhūr
- Pachattiri
- Pallippuram
- Pariyāpuram
- Ponmundam (Vailathoor)
- Purathur
- Rayiramangalam
- Thalakkad (Betteth Puthiya Angadi)
- Thanalur
- Trikkandiyoor (Tirur)
- Triprangode
- Vettom

== Political history ==
=== Ancient history ===
Names, routes, and locations of the Periplus of the Erythraean Sea (1st century CE)

The ancient port of Tyndis, mentioned in the Periplus of the Erythraean Sea, was located on the northern side of Muziris and is believed to have been situated near Tanur. The exact location of Tyndis remains disputed, with suggested sites at Ponnani, Tanur, Beypore–Chaliyam–Kadalundi–Vallikkunnu, and Koyilandy. Notably, Ponnani marked the southern boundary of the kingdom of Tanur, while the Beypore–Chaliyam–Kadalundi–Vallikkunnu region was at its northern end. Tyndis was a major trade hub, second only to Muziris, facilitating trade between the Cheras dynasty and the Roman Empire.

Pliny the Elder, writing in the 1st century CE, noted that the port of Tyndis was located at the northwestern border of Keprobotos (Chera dynasty). During the Sangam period, the North Malabar region, lying north of the port at Tyndis, was ruled by the kingdom of Ezhimala. According to the Periplus of the Erythraean Sea, the region known as Limyrike began at Naura and Tyndis. However, Ptolemy identified only Tyndis as the Limyrike's starting point. Limyrike likely extended to Kanyakumari, corresponding approximately to the present-day Malabar Coast. The annual value of trade between Rome and this region has been estimated at around 50,000,000 sesterces. Pliny the Elder also mentioned that Limyrike was prone to attacks by pirates. Cosmas Indicopleustes identified it as a key source of peppers.

=== Pre-Portuguese history ===
The early history of Vettathunadu, prior to the arrival of the Portuguese armadas, remains largely obscure. According to legendary traditions, the origin of the dynasty is often dated back to the Chera period. The Chera Kingdom began to disintegrate in the early 12th century. During the following period of instability, most of the Chera lands were taken over by newly arrived Namboothris and Nair chieftains, who defeated the Tamil governors and vassals of the Chera administration. Many of these local rulers proclaimed independence.

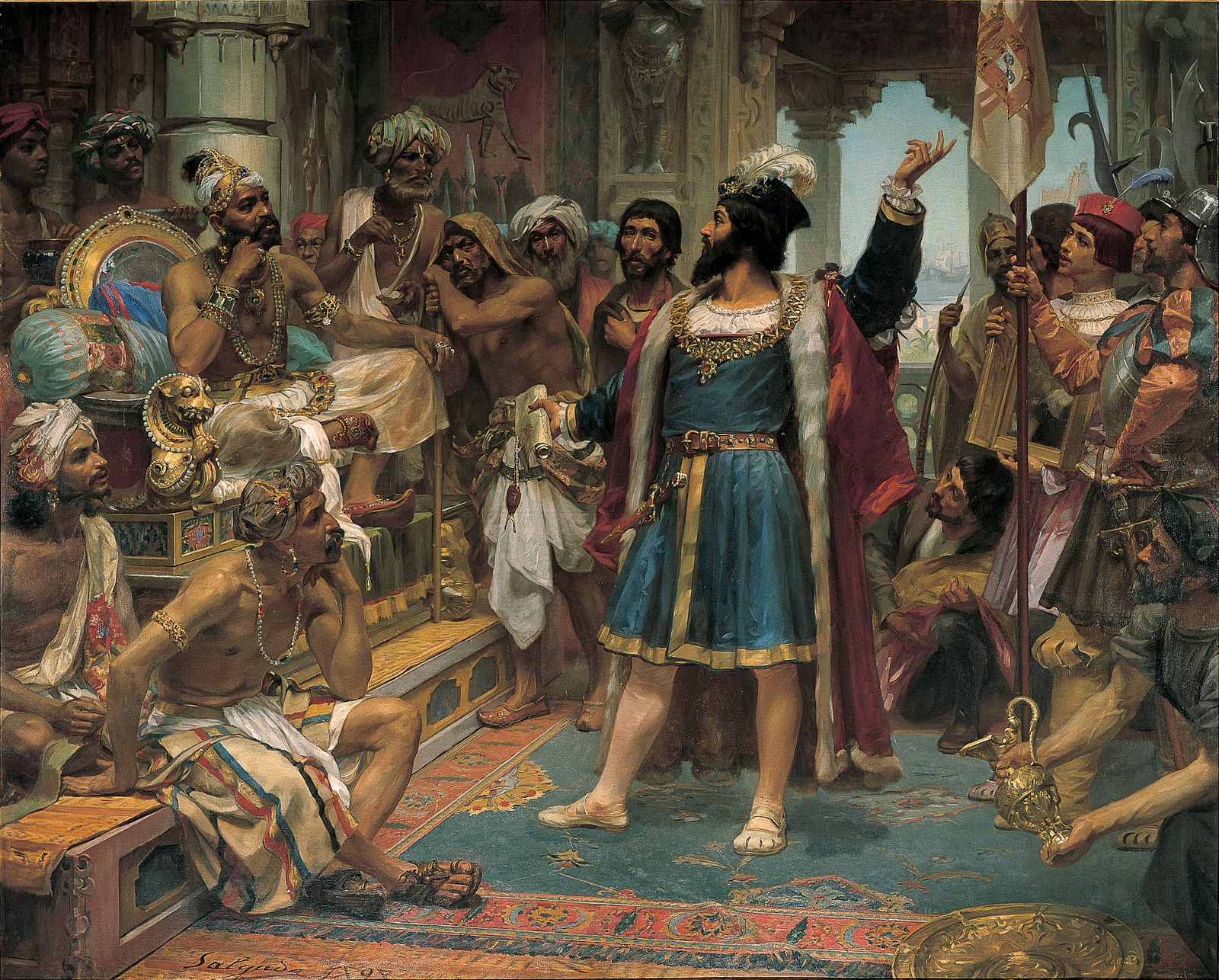
Vasco da Gama and Manavikraman Zamorin by Veloso Salgado (1864–1945)

The ruler of Vettathunadu was among the earliest Nair chieftains in Malabar to acknowledge the suzerainty of the Zamorin of Calicut. The neighbouring states of Parappanad and Beypore also became vassals of the Zamorin. Calicut annexed these regions probably between 1340 and 1350 AD. The primary objective of these conquests was not territorial expansion but rather control of strategic ports and the fertile paddy fields of the Bharathappuzha (Nila) river valley. While regions like Parappanad, Valluvanad, and Vettathunadu prospered due to their geographical advantage in maritime trade, the inland Eranad region suffered from limited access to the Arabian Sea and less fertile lands for paddy cultivation. Following the annexation the Zamorin himself prepared and attended a coronation function of the Vettathunadu king. This was a unique occurrence, as no other vassal state under the Zamorin received such attention. This may be interpreted as the Zamorin's strategy to solidify his authority over the parts, the Bharathappuzha river system, and its fertile valley.

The successors of the Zamorin, known as the Eralpads, governed the banks of the Bharathappuzha river after the annexation of territories formerly belonging to Vettathunadu and neighbouring principalities. During the Thirunavaya Wars, fought between the Cochin–Valluvanad alliance and Calicut, the rulers of Vettathunadu supported the Zamorin. Following the capture of Thirunavaya, the Zamorin declared himself Protector and assumed the sole right to conduct the famous Mamankam festival. As part of their allegiance, all feudatories, including the Vettathunadu king, were required to send flags to Thirunavaya during the festival as a symbol of respect for the Zamorin. During the Mamankam festival, the king of Vettathunadu held the right to stand on the right of the Zamorin of Calicut, while the Shah Bandar Koya of Calicut stood on the Zamorin's left.

After the puberty ceremony (thirandu-kalyanam) of the Zamorin princess (Thampurati), the Zamorin selected a suitable husband for his "anathiraval". They were generally chosen, for political and strategic reasons from the dynasties of Vettam, Berypore, Kurumburanad, and Kodungallur.

As the coronation ceremonies (Ari-yittu-vazhcha) of a new Zamorin, held after the death of his uncle, included a ritual where the Zamorin entered the pulakuli pond hand-in-hand with the raja of Punnattur. Until 1793, the Vettathunadu king also participated in the ceremony, holding the Zamorin's right hand, with the Punnattur king holding his left. The lord of Kalpakanchery (a region within Vettathunadu) was also present during the coronation of a new Zamorin.

=== Portuguese arrival ===
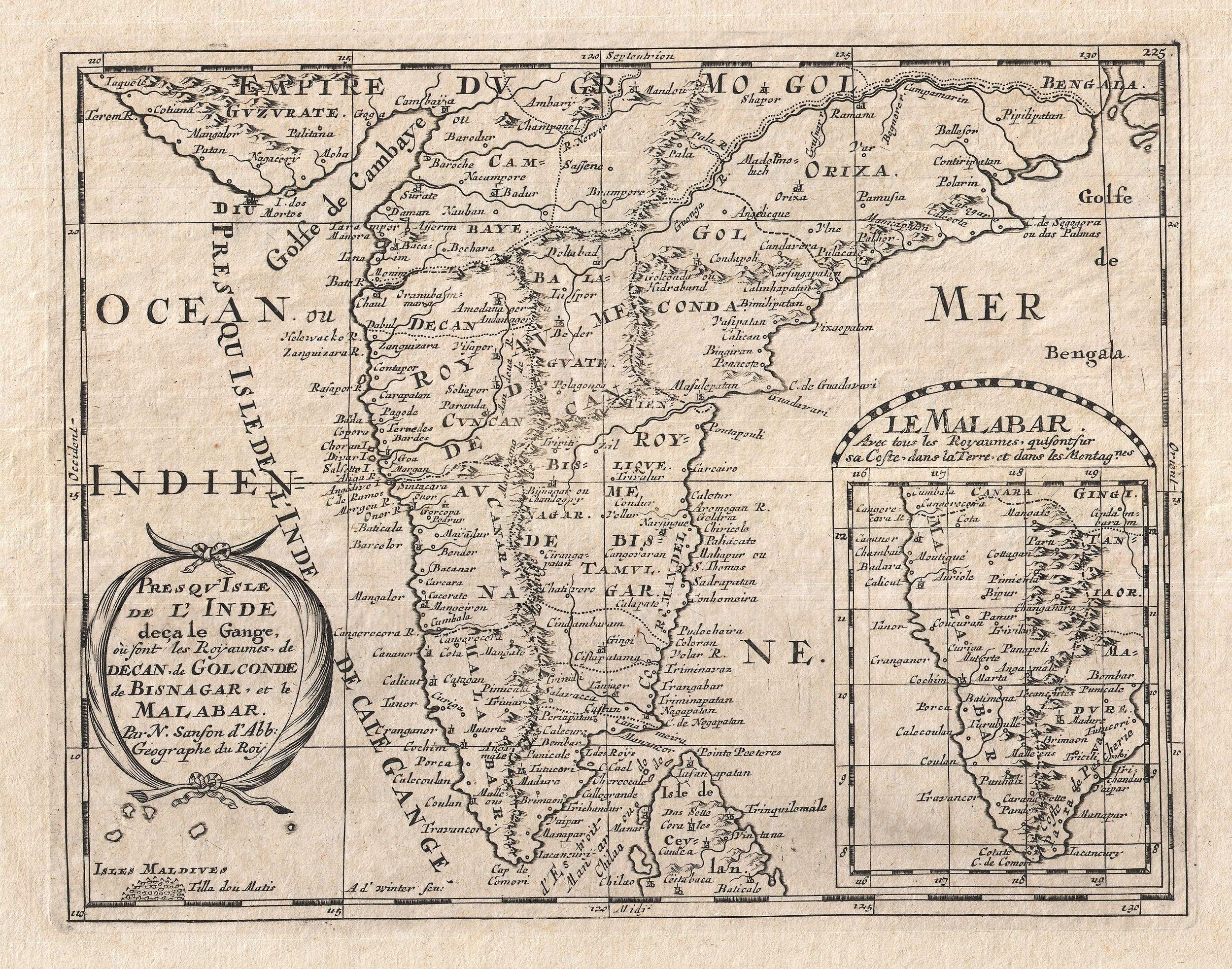
Map of India from 1652 (Tanur was a major port town on Malabar Coast)

The rulers of Tanur aligned with the Portuguese during the 16th and 17th centuries.

The Portuguese Armada, led by Vasco da Gama, first landed in Malabar in 1498. However, the Zamorin of Calicut soon expelled the Portuguese from his territories. The Portuguese quickly found local allies among some of the city-states on the Malabar Coast, such as Cochin, Cannanore, and Quilon. The ruler of Tanur (Vettathuraja), who was partially subject to the Zamorin at the time, also seized this opportunity to break away. Like the kings of Beypore and Chaliyam (Parappanad), he secretly opposed the policies of the Zamorin regarding the Kingdom of Cochin. Despite these alliances with the Portuguese, the Tanur forces under the king fought for the Zamorin in the Battle of Cochin (1504).

==== The Defection of Tanur ====
After the raid on Cranganore in October 1504, Lopo Soares de Albergaria, commander of the Sixth Portuguese Indian Armada, received an urgent appeal from the ruler of Tanur. The Vettathuraja, in conflict with his overlord, the Zamorin of Calicut, offered to submit Portuguese suzerainty in exchange for military assistance. The Vettathuraja reported that a Calicut column, personally led by the Zamorin, had been hastily assembled to counter the Portuguese hold on Cranganore. However, the forces of Tanur managed to block the Zamorin's passage at Tanur. Responding to his request, Lopo Soares dispatched Pêro Rafael with a caravel and a sizeable Portuguese armed contingent to aid Tanur. The combined forces defeated and dispersed Zamorin's column upon its arrival.

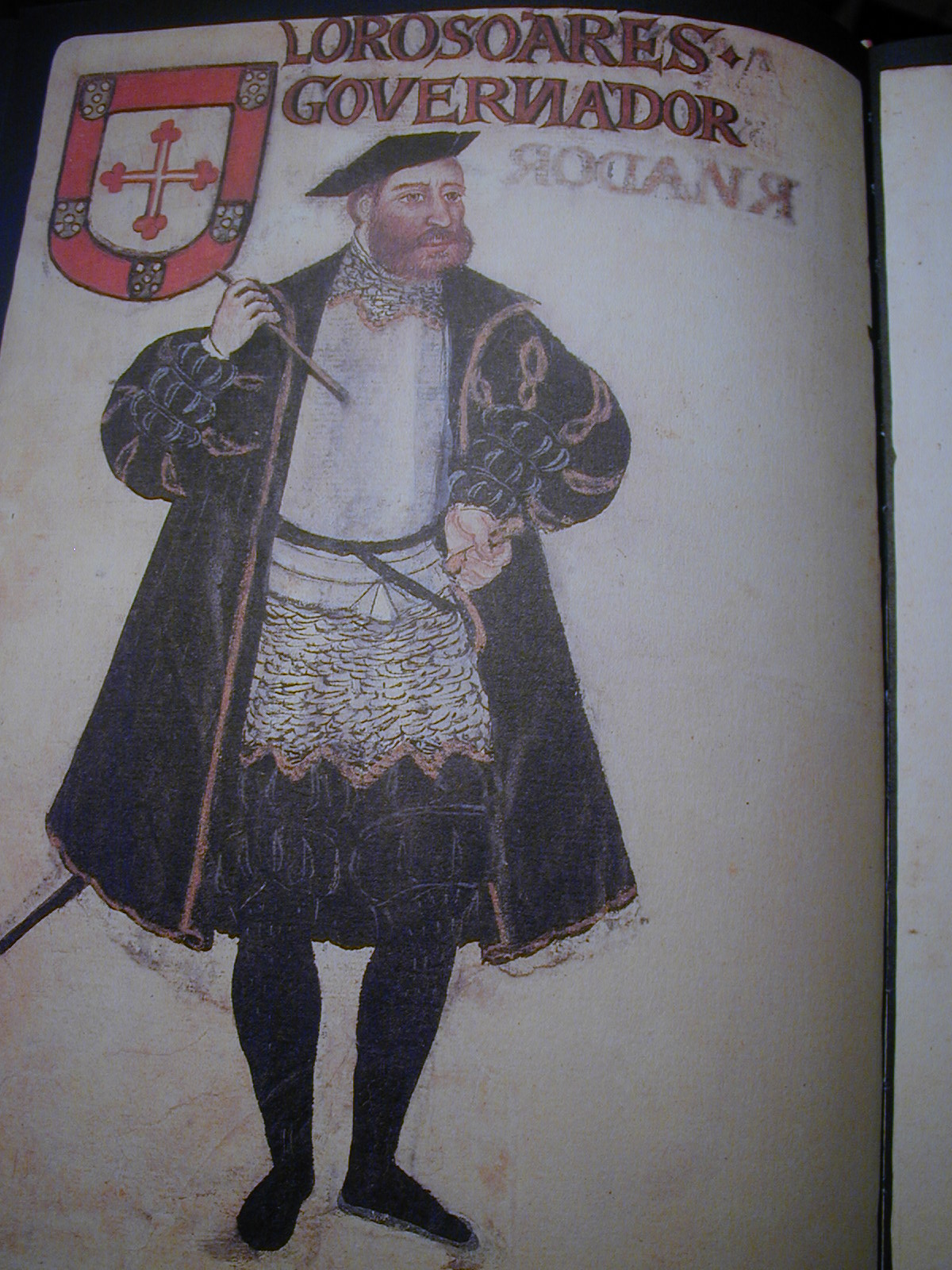
Governor Lopo Soares de Albergaria, in Livro de Lisuarte de Abreu

The raid on Cranganore and the defection of Tanur dealt serious blows to the Zamorin, pushing the frontline northward and placing the Vembanad lagoon out of the Zamorin's reach. The loss dashed any immediate hopes the Zamorin had of resuming his attempts to capture Cochin via the backwaters. Equally devastating were the battles at Cranganore and Tanur, involving significant numbers of Malabari captains and troops, which exposed the waning authority of the Zamorin.

On 31 December 1504, commander Lopo Soares de Albergaria set out from Cochin with plans to dock briefly at the port of Ponnani to pay respects to his newly aligned ally, the king of Vettam. During the negotiations for entry at the port, Lopo Soares received a message that redirected him to the Battle of Pandarane (modern-day Koyilandi). Later in 1505, the king of Vettam invited a small Portuguese force to his kingdom. Despite a growing alliance with the Portuguese, the king hesitated to openly defy the Zamorin. Instead, he sent the Portuguese back with numerous presents and a pledge of secret support against the Zamorin.

Describing the kingdom, Barbosa (1516) says:

Further on … are two places of Moors (Mappilas) 5 leagues from one another. One is called Paravanor, and the other Tanor, and inland from these towns is a lord (Vettathuraja) to whom they belong; and he (Vettathuraja) has many Nairs, and sometimes he rebels against the King of Calicut (Samoothiri). In these towns, there is much shipping and trade, for these Moors is great merchants.

Correa (1521) praises the kingdom's hospitality, saying:

…and the lord of Tanor (Vettathuraja), who carried on a great sea-trade with many ships, which trafficked all about the coast of India with passes from our (Portuguese) Governors, for he only dealt in wares of the country; and thus he was the greatest possible friend of the Portuguese, and those who went to his dwelling were entertained with the greatest honour, as if they had been his brothers. In fact, for this purpose he kept houses fitted up, and both cots and bed-steads furnished in our fashion, with tables and chairs and casks of wine, with which he regaled our people, giving them entertainments and banquets, insomuch that it seemed as if he were going to become a Christian…

Muslim merchants in the region remained steadfastly allied with the Zamorin of Calicut. In 1523, a bold merchant from Tanur demonstrated his loyalty by sailing a fleet of 8 ships and 40 boats from Calicut to the Red Sea before the eyes of the Portuguese viceroy Duarte de Menezes. At the time, Portuguese power in the region was too weak to respond to such actions. Following the death of the Portuguese viceroy Vasco da Gama in December 1524, tensions escalated. Shortly thereafter, some 100 ships, with the support of Zamorin, attacked Jewish and Christian settlements in Kodungallūr. This attacking Moplah party included men from Tānūr and Chāliyam. In 1528, a ship was wrecked off the coast of Vettam, and the king of Vettam provided shelter to the crew, refusing to surrender them to the Zamorin. Some sources indicate that the ship belonged to Portugal. However, the Tohfut-ul-Mujahideen identifies the ship as French:

And in the year (A.H.) 935, a ship belonging to the Franks was wrecked off Tanur. Now the Ray of that place affording aid to the crew, the Zamorin sent a messenger to him demanding of him the surrender of the Franks who composed it, together with such parts of the cargo of the ship as had been saved, but that chieftain having refused compliance with this demand, a treaty of peace was entered into with the Franks by him; and from this time the subjects of the Ray of Tanur traded under the protection of the passes of the Franks.

Then, envoys of Nuno da Cunha entered into a successful intrigue with the king of Vettam (the same king to be converted to Christianity later) to make a fort on the north bank of the Bharathappuzha river, opposite of Ponnāni town. However, the Portuguese were not successful as the ships bringing building materials were destroyed when trying to cross the dangerous river mouth during a storm.

In 1529, being joined by six brigantines and a galley, with 100 chosen men commanded by Christopher de Melo, the united squadron of Lope Vaz de Sampayo took a very large ship laden with pepper in the river Chale, though defended by numerous artillery and 800 men.

==== Battles at Chaliyam Fort ====
Siege and battles at Chaliyam Fort
- Part of Portuguese battles in the Indian Ocean
Date	1538-40, 1571
Location	Chaliyam, India
Result	Victory of Zamorin of Calicut, destruction of Chaliyam fort

Belligerents
Portuguese Empire; Tanur, Malappuram; Chaliyam	Zamorin of Calicut; Mappilas from Ponnani, Punur, Tanur and Parappanangadi

Commanders and leaders
Athed (?)	Zamorin of Calicut; Pattu Kunnhāli (Kunnhāli Marakkār III)

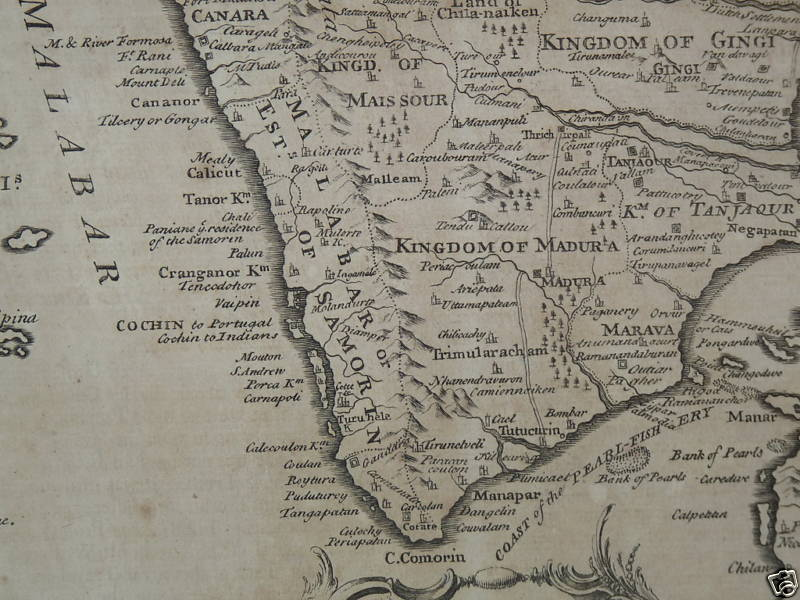
South India from a map by Emanuel Bowen, an English map engraver. Note that in the map, only Vettathunadu is shown with a separate boundary within the Kingdom of Samoothiri.

Chāliyam (also known as Chale) was a strategic Portuguese garrison between 1531 and 1571. Only 10 km south of Calicut, it was situated on a river that falls into the sea about three leagues from Calicut, and which is navigable by boats all the way to the foot of the Ghat mountains.

In 1531, the 'Christian convert' Vettam king permitted the construction of a Portuguese fort on Chaliyam island as a part of a peace treaty between the Zamorin (Samoothiri) and the Portuguese viceroy (the governor-general) Nuno da Cunha. Perplexed by his great losses continually sustained due to the Portuguese superiority at sea, the Samoothiri made overtures towards an accommodation and under Nuno da Cunha the Portuguese began retaining their lost supremacy. At this time, Chaliyam was controlled by the Parappanad raja named Urinama. Like the Vettathuraja, he also helped the Portuguese. These two kings were anxious to throw off their subjection to the Samoothiri and to ally with the Portuguese in hopes of becoming rich by participating in their trade.

Immediately upon procuring the consent of the Zamorin to construct the fort, Nuno da Cunha set out from Goa with 150 sail of vessels, in which were 3,000 Portuguese troops and 1,000 native Lascarines. So much diligence was used in carrying on the work—with even the gentlemen participating in the labour—that in 26 days it was in a defensible situation, being surrounded by a rampart nine feet thick and of sufficient height, strengthened by towers, bastions, and bulwarks. The rectangular-shaped fort was built to decline the Arab sea trade in the region. In 1532 with the help of the king of Vettam, a chapel was built at Chaliyam, together with a house for the commander, barracks for the soldiers, and storehouses for trade. The Portuguese captain Diego de Pereira, who had negotiated the treaty with the Zamorin, was left in command of this new fortress, with a garrison of 250 men; and Manuel de Sousa had orders to secure its safety by sea, with a squadron of 22 vessels.

The Samoothiri soon regretted allowing this fort to be built in his dominions, and endeavoured ineffectually to induce the rebellious kings—the Parappanatturaja, the Caramanlii (King of Beypore?), and by some records the Vettathuraja—to break with the Portuguese, even going to war against them.

==== Samoothiri's first attempt (1538–1540) ====
Within seven years, the Zamorin attacked Vettam and Chāliyam (Parappanad) in 1538. The king of Parappanād made unconditional peace with the Zamorin. The king of Vettam, after a protracted fight, was compelled to surrender some of his lands near Ponnāni and Chāliyam island; however, the Portuguese fort could not be destroyed. The Zamorin now had absolute control over the area around the fort. By 1540, the Zamorin entered into an agreement with the Portuguese and stopped the war, but skirmishes continued in the seas by Moplah navigators based at Ponnāni.

==== Conversion of Vettathuraja ====
From 1545, the Vettathuraja banked on the Portuguese to help him solidify his position vis-à-vis the Samoothiri. In his experience in dealing with the Portuguese, he presumed that converting to Christianity was the way to express his political alliance and client relationship. The Vettathuraja announced to the Portuguese religious specialists that his conversion had to remain secret in order not to lose his honour or his Caste. In fact, it was his close political (and religious ties) to the Portuguese that may have brought him certain disadvantages on the complicated checkerboard of power relations on the Malabar Coast. Jesuit records claim that the Vettathuraja thus played his own double game with the Portuguese and rival regional kings. The Vettathuraja demanded to preserve after conversion certain external signs of his caste, such as the Poonul, as well as other Hindu customs. The unanimous opinion of the ecclesiastics in Goa was that such dissimulation went against the decisions of the Church Fathers. The theologians in Goa were puzzled and undecided about the question as to whether or not to permit Vettathuraja to continue wearing the external signs of a Brahman.

An urgent ad hoc consultation headed by Governor Jorge Cabral debated this issue and drafted some of the first typically accommodationist propositions. It was the bishop, Juan de Albuquerque, who furnished Biblical examples on behalf of such accommodating practices.

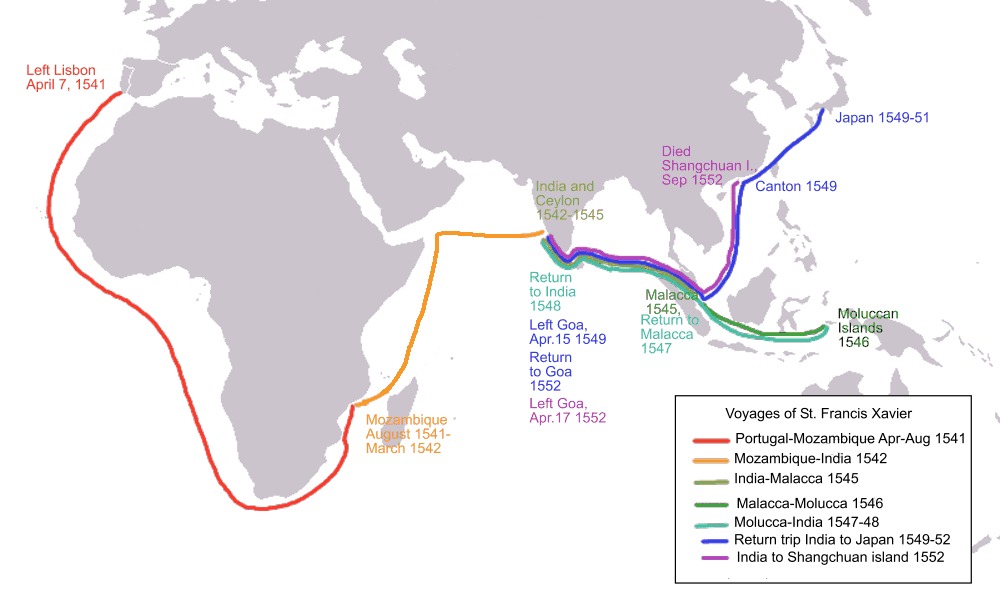
Voyages of St. Francis Xavier

Tanur town was one of the oldest Portuguese settlements in Kerala. In 1546, Saint Francis Xavier visited Tanur.

In 1549 the King of Vettam fell in the offers of the Portuguese and officially converted to Christianity. The conversion took place in Goa in a festive mood led by a Jesuit padre named António Gomes. Gomes was a Catholic missionary who arrived from Goa in October 1548. The offer was to make him the king of Kērala by defeating the Zamorin. The poor king believed them. At the time, the choice to convert the Vettathuraja—whose tiny realm was jammed between Samoothiri to the north, mostly hostile to Portuguese, and the fortress of Chaliyam, guarded by Portuguese soldiers—appeared both practical and providential. Jesuit records says that Vettathuraja himself begged to be converted and asked for a Christian priest to reside in Tanur.

After the conversion, he was called Dom João. Vettathuraja was not permitted in Goa. After various spectacular or secret negotiations, confinements and escapes, Vettathuraja did finally visit Goa in October 1549. He received a sumptuous and ostentatious reception. He was paraded in procession through Goa, accompanied by various musical instruments such as trombetas, kettledrums and shawms, as well as artillery discharges and church bells; Vettathuraja was dressed up by the Portuguese as they felt fitting for the king: "in honourable and rich clothes, with a very rich sword fastened [around the waist], with a rich dagger, one golden chain, black velvet slippers, a black velvet hat with a printed design".

But, a few days after, the king returned to Hinduism saying he did not have any gain. Once he regained his kingdom loaded with Portuguese gifts, Vettathuraja doffed his Portuguese clothes and in the long run disappointed Governor Cabral and the Jesuits. It was the politics of pepper that undid his friendship with the Portuguese. On 21 February 1550, Cabral wrote to the king of Portugal Dom João III doubting that Vettathuraja converted sincerely: "Jesuits who had so much confidence in conversion of Vettathuraja confess that they were deceived, but by caution, I have to dissemble with him". In addition, he cautioned that "the conversion to Christianity might produce 'discord' between the Samoothiri and Kochi and endanger the regular procurement of pepper in Kerala".

In fact, the Fourth Pepper War broke out sometime before June 1550 over a disputed territory—the island of Varutela—between the King of Kochi and the king of Vadakkumkur. A series of bloody encounters ensued and the Samoothiri allied with the Vettathuraja on the side of the king of Vadakkumkur, who was opposed to the King of Kochi and the Portuguese. After negotiations, rendered even more complicated by the appointment of the new Portuguese viceroy, Dom Affonso de Noronha, the conflict remained unsettled and the amuck runners of the deceased King of Vadakkumkur wreaked havoc in the town of Kochi. Consequently, the cargo of pepper was not sent to Lisbon until late February 1551.

Roughly from April until September 1549, Gomes partly resided in Tanur, and partly travelled southwards along the Malabar Coast. He had been officially sent by the bishop, Juan de Albuquerque, to instruct the Vettathuraja reputed to have been secretly converted to Christianity the previous year. By this time, the situation had somewhat changed: the Vettathuraja was secretly converted by the vicar in Chaliyam, João Soares, and the Franciscan Frey Vicente de Lagos, who gave the neophyte a metal crucifix to hang onto a thread, "hidden on his chest".

Gomes was allowed to build the church in Tanur, to baptise the Vettathuraja's wife as Dona Maria, and to perform Christian marriage rites for the kingly couple—all this was done in secret (ocultamente).

When Lopo Soares arrived at Cochin (1553) after his victory over the Samoothiri, the Vettathuraja sent him a complaint against the Samoothiri, begging for peace and help against the Samoothiri. In 1569 and 1570 there were again wars between the Portuguese and Zamorin's forces at Chāliyam fort. In these wars the notorious Moplah dacoit Kutti Pōker died fighting the Portuguese at Chāliyam fort.

==== Samoothiri's second attempt (1571) ====
In 1571, the Zamorin got a fresh chance against the Portuguese. With help from nearby Moplahs, he began besieging Chāliyam fort. The Moplah admiral Pattu Kunnhāli (Kunnhāli Marakkār III) led the navy of the Zamorin in the siege. Moplahs from Ponnani, Punur, Tanur, and Parappanangadi were in the fleet.

The Zamorin spent great amount of money in the siege. The seizing force dug many trenches around the fortress. At the end of the two months of siege, the Zamorin himself came to Chaliyam from Ponnani and began to command. The Portuguese were starving inside the garrison, since food sent from Cochin and Cannanore was being blocked.

After two months of siege, on the midnight of 15 September 1571, the Portuguese led by Athed surrendered to the alliance. They agreed empty the fortress on the condition that no one will be harmed. The Vettam king escorted the Portuguese in their return journey to Tanur. Then they were sent to Cochin.

The Zamorin destroyed the fort and the chapel—it has been his greatest problem ever since its construction in 1531. He sent most of the debris to Calicut and he gave the land to build a new mosque. As earlier decided, he gave Kottaparamba and the surrounding areas to the king of Parappanād, his ally in the siege.

Antonio Fernandes de Chaliyam (Chale) held an important command under Portuguese generals, and was raised to the dignity of a knight of the military Order of Christ. He was a convert from Chaliyam. Killed in action in 1571, Antonio Fernandes received a state funeral at Goa.

The Portuguese sailors burned Chāliyam town in 1572 as revenge.

=== Post-Portuguese history ===
By the 17th century, the Portuguese authority on the Malabar Coast significantly reduced with the emergence of the Dutch. Soon the small principalities in the region became puppets in the hands of the two colonial powers and fought each other. In 1658 the crown of Cochin became vacant and five princes from the Tānūr and Aroor dynasties were adopted to the palace by the regent of Cochin, Queen Gangādhara Lakshmi (1656–1658), and were given the right to succeed. This regent queen was under the influence of the Portuguese, and later the eldest member of the adoptees from Tanur, Rama Varma (1658–1662), was crowned. This incidence of adoption is mentioned in some of the local folk tales. However, Henric Vanrid has stated that the number of adoptions as four. Two of the five adopted were from Tanur, but there is no hint of how many people were adopted from Aroor and what happened to them later. Nonetheless, nine of them survived to be kings.

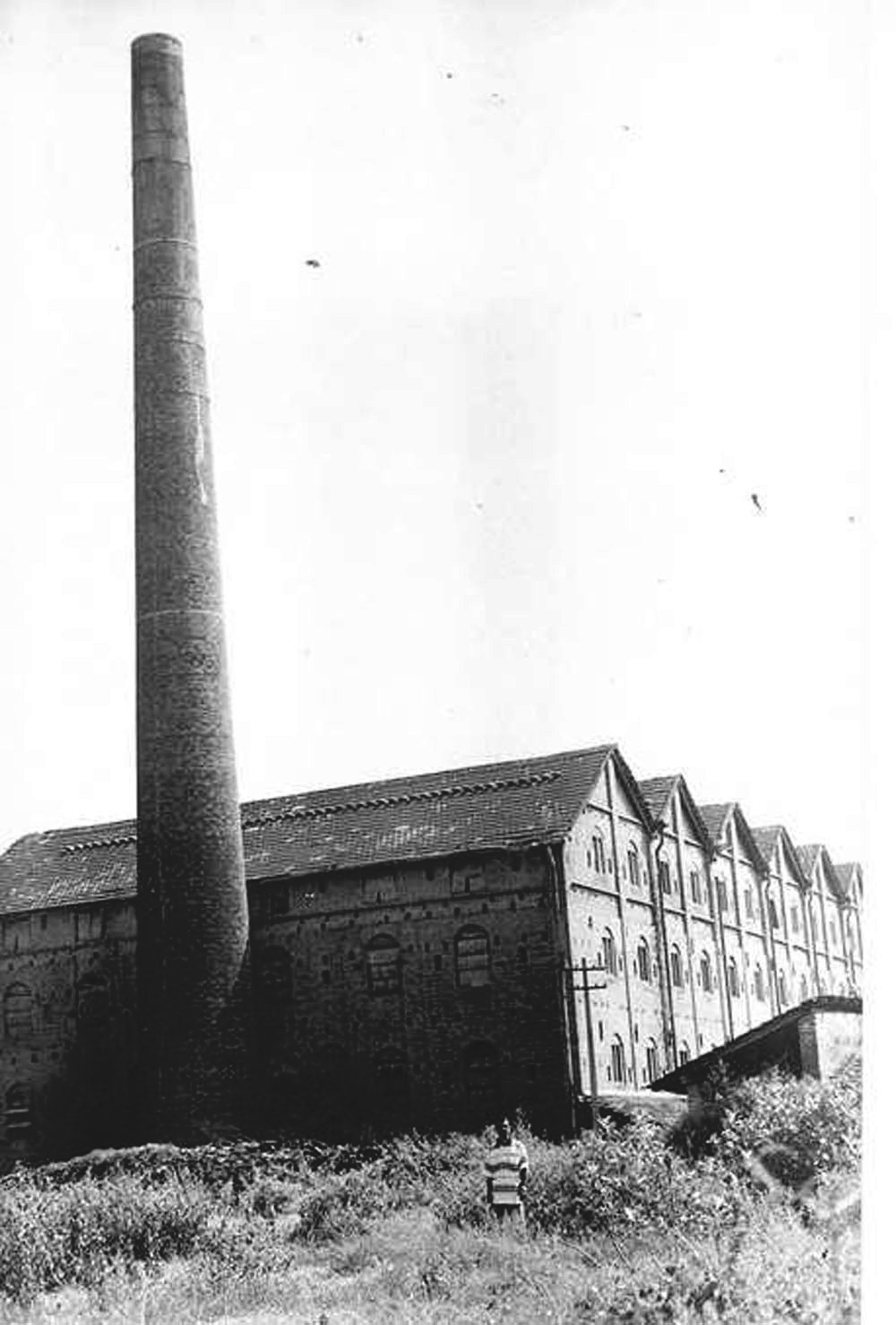
Codacal Tile Factory was run by the Commonwealth Trust at Codacal. Started in 1887, it was the second tile manufacturing industry in India.

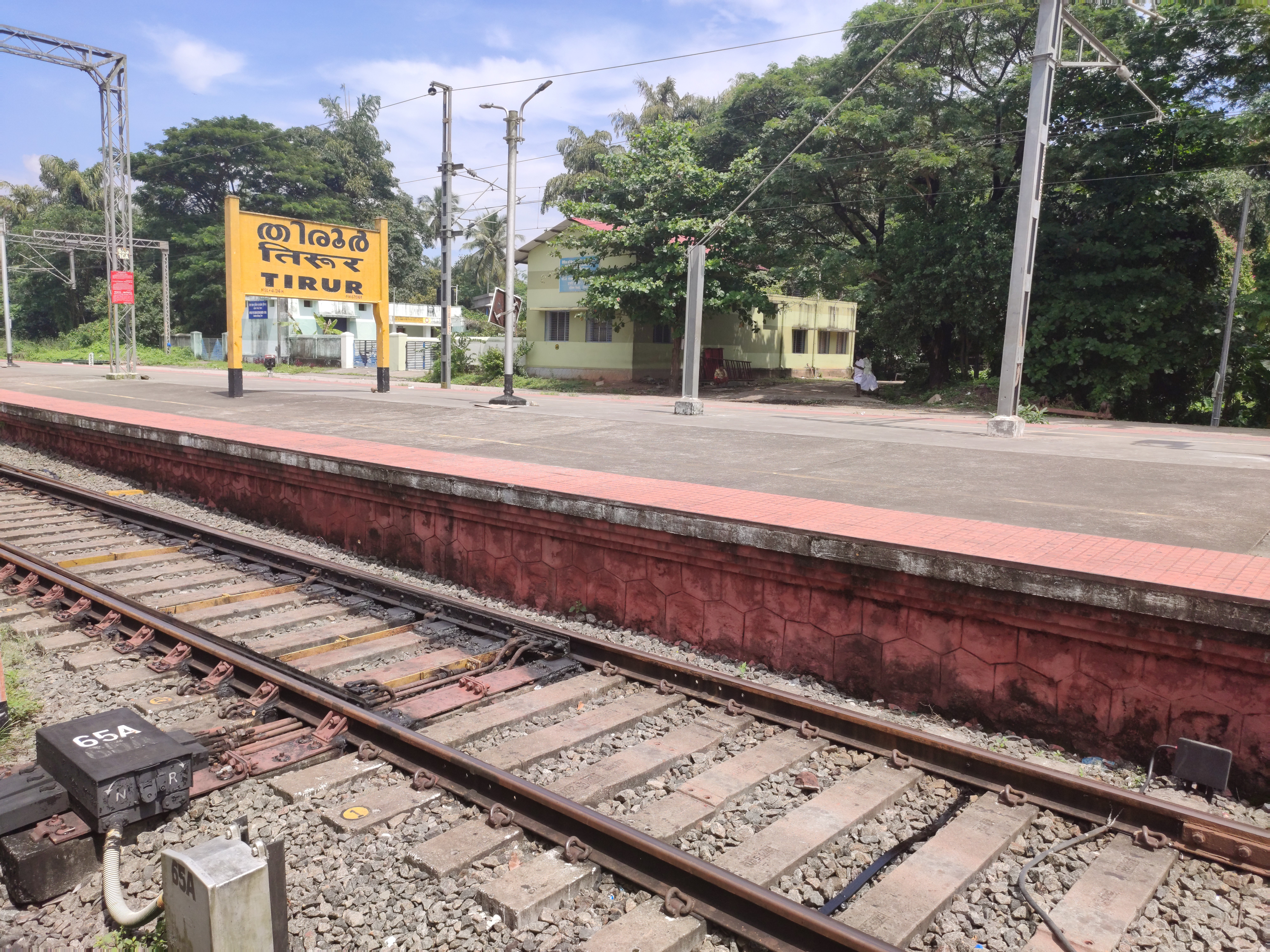
Tirur railway station, the oldest railway station of Kerala, opened in 1861

However, an elder branch (mūtta tāvazhi) of the Cochin dynasty itself ignored the adoptions and appealed to the Zamorin of Calicut for help. The leader of the elder branch was the dispossessed prince Vīra Kērala Varma. The Zamorin decided to help the elder branch and Āditya Varma, king of Vadakkumkūr, king of Edappally and ruler of Pāliyam rallied around the Zamorin in support of the elder branch's dispossessed prince. The king of Purakkad supported the ruling Tānūr princes. On the advice of the chief of Pāliyam, the dispossessed prince set sail to Colombo in Ceylon and asked help from the Dutch governor, Joan Maetsuycker, against the Portuguese-supported ruling princes. Later he sought exile in Colombo. The Dutch now found a huge chance of getting a major say in the politics of Malabar. In 1661, the Dutch led the allies of the dispossessed prince, with the armies of Zamorin of Calicut, against the Portuguese and the ruling Cochin king (Tānūr adoptee). The city of Cochin was attacked and the battle resulted in a disastrous failure of the Portuguese and Cochin rulers. Three of the Tānūr princes including Rama Varma killed in the war, Rani Gangadharalakshmi was sent to prison and the ruling king escaped to Eranākulam where he was given refuge by the king of Purakkad. After the death of Rama Varma and the other adopted prince Goda Varma (1662–1663), only survivor from Tanur, was crowned. On 7 January 1663, the Dutch attacked Cochin Port again and the prince surrendered to the Dutch. Vīra Kērala Varma (1663–1687) later crowned as the king of Cochin by the Dutch.

With the eclipse of the Portuguese influence in Malabar, the Kingdom of Tanur was reduced in status to one of the numerous petty states in the region. In the 18th century, the Kingdom of Mysore expanded its territory to the Malabar Coast; the Tanur royal family lost many of its members during the invasion of Mysore. By the treaty of Seringapatam, Mysore ceded Malabar to the English East India Company. On 14 August 1792, a minister of Tanur took over the kingdom for his king from the East India Company. With the death of the Vettam king on 24 May 1793, the Tanur dynasty came to an end. At the time, Joint Commissioners were carrying out revenue settlements of the kingdom as the beginning of the British occupation in Malabār. Since there was no heir to the throne, the British took over the rule again and soon absorbed Tanur into the newly formed Malabar District. The temple of the Tanur royal family was transferred to the Zamorin of Calicut in 1842.

== Ponnani Canal ==
The Ponnani Canal was constructed for the transportation of goods from Ponnani to the Tirur railway station. Basel Mission employees at Codacal mentioned the Ponnani Canal, saying:

''...nowadays a steamship travels between Ponani and Tirur through the Canal, where the most convenient railway station for Ponnani is to be found. The ticket costs only 4 annas, although the distance is 10 km...''

== Kerala school of astronomy and mathematics ==
The Kerala school of astronomy and mathematics flourished between the 14th and 16th centuries. In attempting to solve astronomical problems, the Kerala school independently created a number of important mathematics concepts, including series expansion for trigonometric functions. Their work, completed two centuries before the invention of calculus in Europe, provided what is now considered the first example of a power series (apart from geometric series). However, they did not formulate a systematic theory of differentiation and integration, nor is there any direct evidence of their results being transmitted outside Kerala.

The Kerala school has made a number of contributions to the fields of infinite series and calculus. These include the following (infinite) geometric series:

$\frac{1}{1-x} = 1 + x + x^2 + x^3 + \cdots \text{ for } |x|<1$

The Kerala school made intuitive use of mathematical induction, though the inductive hypothesis was not yet formulated or employed in proofs. They used this to discover a semi-rigorous proof of the result:

$1^p+ 2^p + \cdots + n^p \approx \frac{n^{p+1}}{p+1}$

for large n.

They applied ideas from (what was to become) differential and integral calculus to obtain (Taylor–Maclaurin) infinite series representations for $\sin x$, $\cos x$, and $\arctan x$. The Tantrasangraha-vakhya gives the series in verse, which when translated to mathematical notation, can be written as:

$r\arctan\left(\frac{y}{x}\right) = \frac{1}{1}\cdot\frac{ry}{x} -\frac{1}{3}\cdot\frac{ry^3}{x^3} + \frac{1}{5}\cdot\frac{ry^5}{x^5} - \cdots, \text{ where } \frac y x \leq 1.$
$r\sin \frac{x}{r} = x - x\cdot\frac{x^2}{(2^2+2)r^2} + x\cdot \frac{x^2}{(2^2+2)r^2}\cdot\frac{x^2}{(4^2+4)r^2} - \cdot$
$r \left( 1 - \cos \frac{x}{r} \right) = r \frac{x^2}{(2^2-2)r^2} - r \frac{x^2}{(2^2-2)r^2}\cdot \frac{x^2}{(4^2-4)r^2} + \cdots$

where, for $r = 1,$ the series reduce to the standard power series for these trigonometric functions, for example:

$\sin x = x - \frac{x^3}{3!} + \frac{x^5}{5!} - \frac{x^7}{7!} + \cdots$
$\cos x = 1 - \frac{x^2}{2!} + \frac{x^4}{4!} - \frac{x^6}{6!} + \cdots$

(The Kerala school did not use the "factorial" symbolism.)

The Kerala school made use of the rectification (computation of length) of the arc of a circle to give a proof of these results. (The later method of Leibniz, using quadrature (i.e. computation of area under the arc of the circle), was not yet developed.) They also made use of the series expansion of $\arctan x$ to obtain an infinite series expression (later known as Gregory series) for $\pi$:

$\frac{\pi}{4} = 1 - \frac{1}{3} + \frac{1}{5} - \frac{1}{7} + \cdots$

Their rational approximation of the error for the finite sum of their series are of particular interest. For example, the error, $f_i(n+1)$, (for n odd, and i = 1, 2, 3) for the series:

$\frac{\pi}{4} \approx 1 - \frac{1}{3}+ \frac{1}{5} - \cdots (-1)^{(n-1)/2}\frac{1}{n} + (-1)^{(n+1)/2}f_i(n+1)$
where $f_1(n) = \frac{1}{2n}, \ f_2(n) = \frac{n/2}{n^2+1}, \ f_3(n) = \frac{(n/2)^2+1}{(n^2+5)n/2}.$

They manipulated the terms, using the partial fraction expansion of $\frac{1}{n^3-n}$ to obtain a more rapidly converging series for $\pi$:

$\frac{\pi}{4} = \frac{3}{4} + \frac{1}{3^3-3} - \frac{1}{5^3-5} + \frac{1}{7^3-7} - \cdots$

They used the improved series to derive the rational expression $104348/33215$ for $\pi$, correct up to nine decimal places (i.e. $3.141592653$). They made use of an intuitive notion of a limit to compute these results. The Kerala school mathematicians also gave a semi-rigorous method of differentiation of some trigonometric functions, though the notion of a function, or of exponential or logarithmic functions, was not yet formulated.

== Veṭṭathu Tradition (Kathakali) ==
The so-called "Veṭṭathu Tradition" (Veṭṭathu Sampradayam) of the Kerala dance drama Kathakali is attributed to a Raja of Veṭṭathunāṭu (1630–1640). The Raja introduced several important developments into the presentation of Kathakali:

- Introduction of two professional background singers.
- Introduction of chengilas (cymbals) to beat the tala (rhythm).
- Introduction of chenda, a powerful drum played with sticks. Chendas were originally played in the outdoor temple ceremonies to accompany shadow puppets.
- Two singers, the Ponnikkaran and the Sinkidikkaran, were introduced to add the Thiranukuu. Thiranukuu is a method of introducing the evil characters of the play to the audience from behind a large satin curtain, held up at the front of the stage.

== Legacy ==
- T. Raman Nambeesan (1888–1983) wrote a historical novel called Keralesvaran (1926) about a ruler of Tanur.
- Chandrika Vithi, written by Muriyanattu Nampyar, mentions a Vettathu raja called 'Viraraya of Prakasa Kingdom'.

== See also ==
- Valluvanadu
- Ponnani
- Zamorin of Calicut
