= Thavanur Assembly constituency =

Constituency of the Kerala legislative assembly in India

Thavanur
- Constituency No. 47 for the Kerala Legislative Assembly
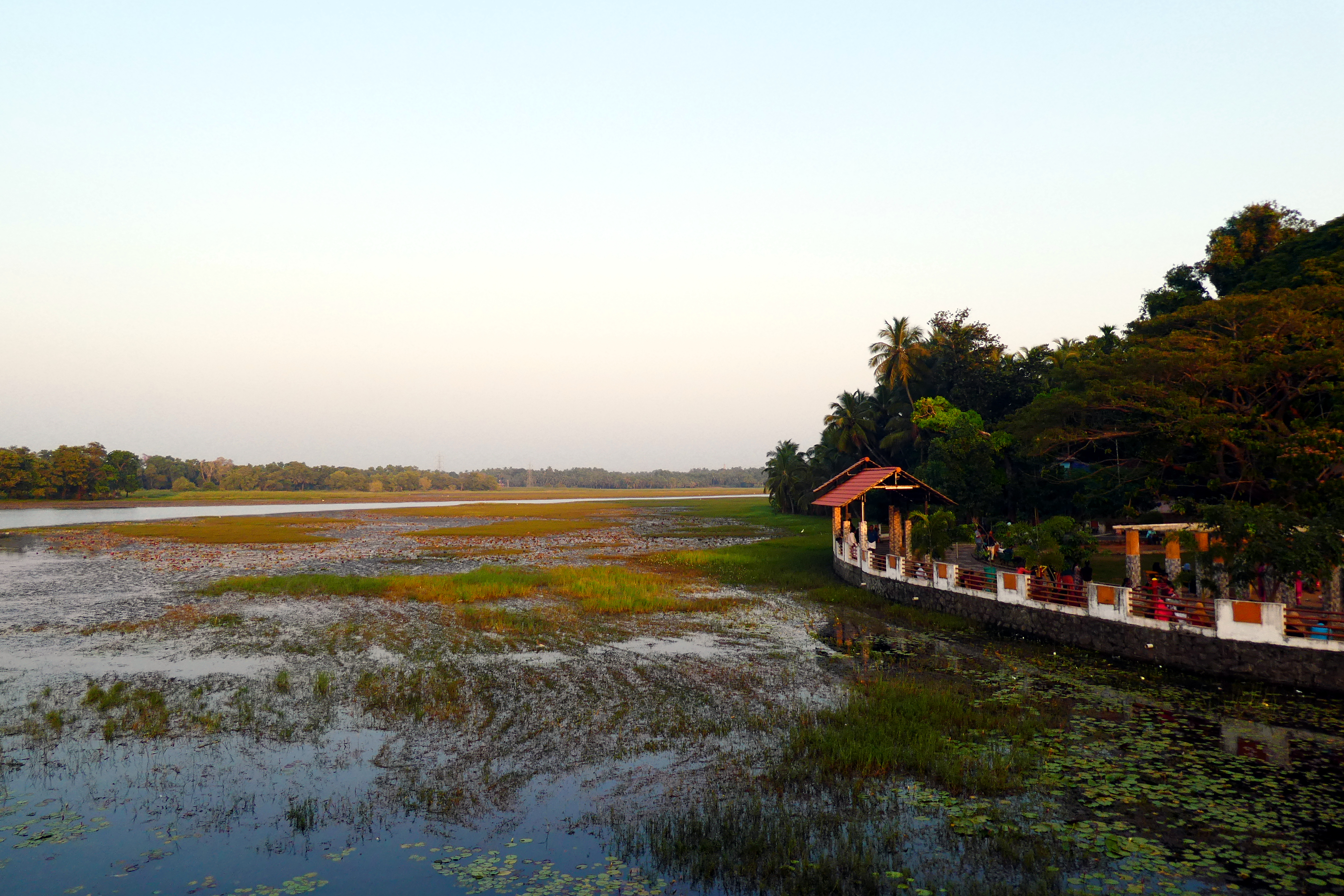
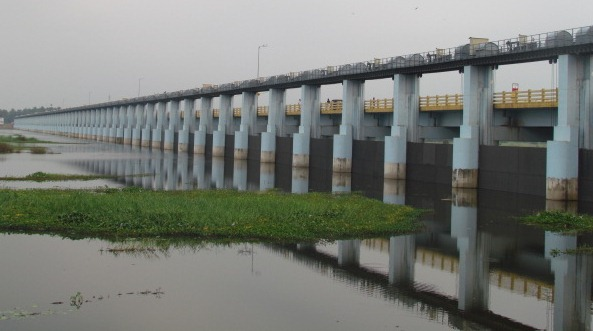
- Top to bottom: Beeyam Kayal Park near Edappal, and Chamravattom Regulator-cum-Bridge at Triprangode that connects Tirur Taluk with Ponnani town.

Constituency details
- Country: India
- Region: South India
- State: Kerala
- District: Malappuram
- Established: 2008
- Total electors: 1,99,960 (2021)
- Reservation: None

Member of Legislative Assembly
- 16th Kerala Legislative Assembly
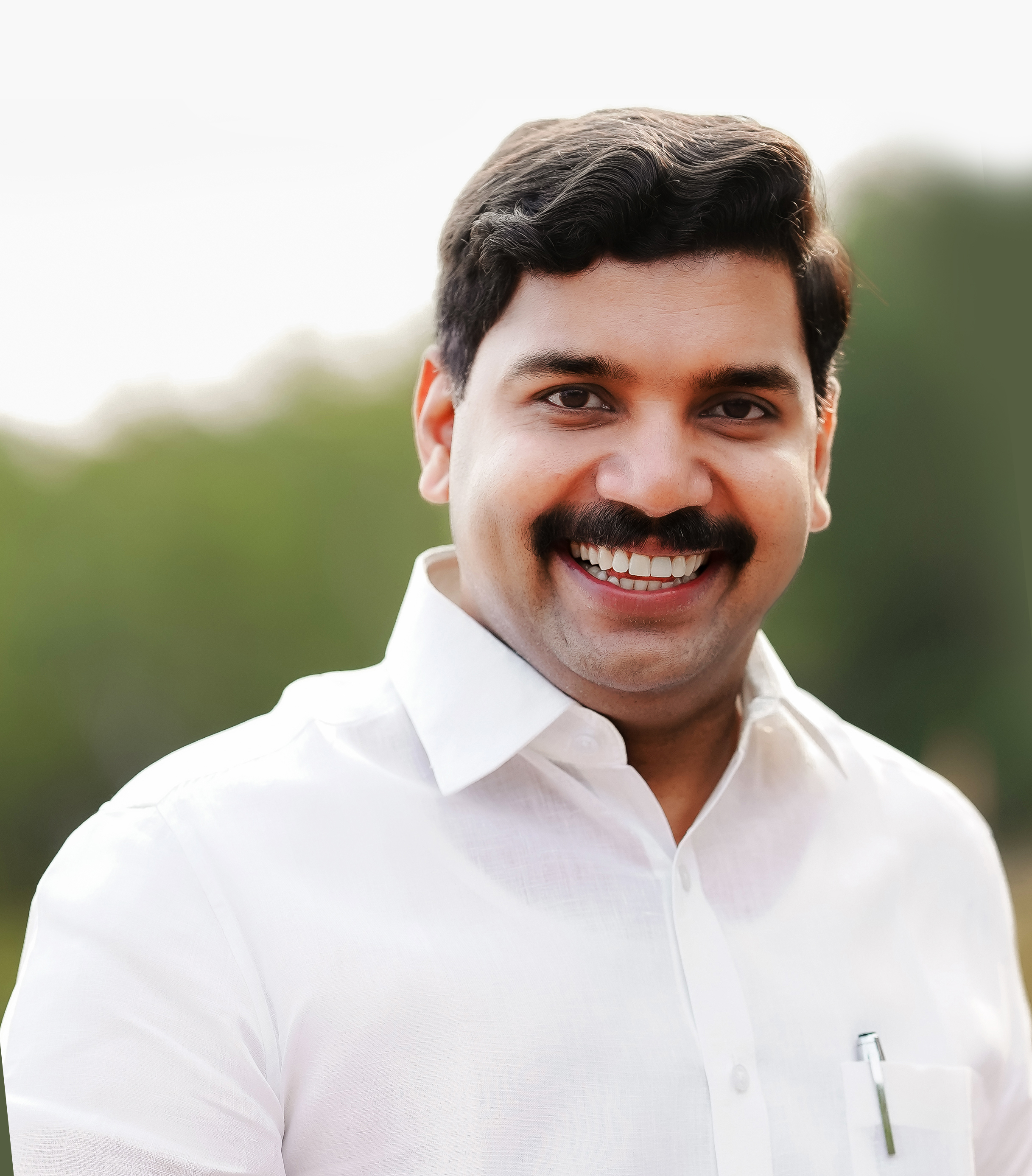
- Incumbent V. S Joy
- Party: Indian National Congress
- Elected year: 2026

Thavanur State assembly constituency is one of the 140 state legislative assembly constituencies in Kerala in southern India. It is also one of the seven state legislative assembly constituencies included in Ponnani Lok Sabha constituency. As of the 2026 Assembly elections, the current MLA is V. S Joy of INC.

== Local self-governed segments ==
Thavanur Assembly constituency is composed of the following local self-governed segments:

Sl no.	Name	Status (Grama panchayat/Municipality)	Taluk	Ruling alliance
1	Thavanur	Grama panchayat	Ponnani	UDF
2	Kalady	Grama panchayat	Ponnani	UDF
3	Vattamkulam	Grama panchayat	Ponnani	UDF
4	Edappal	Grama panchayat	Ponnani	UDF
5	Mangalam	Grama panchayat	Tirur	UDF
6	Triprangode	Grama panchayat	Tirur	UDF
7	Purathur	Grama panchayat	Tirur	UDF

Thavanur Assembly constituency

== Members of Legislative Assembly ==
The following list contains all members of Kerala Legislative Assembly who have represented Thavanur Assembly constituency during the period of various assemblies:

Key

LDF

Election	Niyama Sabha	Member	Party	Tenure
2011	13th	K. T. Jaleel	LDF Independent	2011 – 2016
2016	14th	K. T. Jaleel	LDF Independent	2016 - 2021
2021	15th	K. T. Jaleel	LDF Independent	2021-2026
2026	16th	V. S. Joy	INC	2026-

== Election results in local body elections ==
=== 2025 ===
SEGMENTS	LDF	NDA	UDF	IND	SDPI		LEADING ALLIANCE
THAVANUR	8705	2408	10426	1072	902	23513	UDF
KALADY	6314	2037	8113	717	962	18143	UDF
VATTAMKULAM	9302	3550	11218	360	389	24819	UDF
EDAPPAL	8269	5021	8045	800	0	22135	LDF
MANGALAM	7806	2150	11077	316	360	21709	UDF
TRIPRANGODE	13180	1212	14072	274	48	28786	UDF
PURATHUR	9354	2545	10114	231	0	22244	UDF
TOTAL	62930	18923	73065	3770	2661	161349	
%	39.00241092	11.72799336	45.28382574	2.336549963	1.649220014		

== Election Results ==
Percentage change (±) denotes the change in the number of votes from the immediate previous election.

=== 2026 ===
2026 Kerala Legislative Assembly election: Thavanur
Party	Candidate	Votes	%	±%
INC	V. S Joy	79,661		
LDF	K. T. Jaleel	65,014		
BJP	Ravi Thelath	16,039		
SDPI	Abdul Jaleel	2,021		
NOTA	None of the above	802		
Independent	Abdul Jaleel K. T.	349		
Margin of victory		14,647		
Turnout		1,63,886		
INC gain from LDF		Swing		

=== 2021 ===
There were 1,99,960 registered voters in Thavanur Assembly constituency for the 2021 Kerala Assembly election.

2021 Kerala Legislative Assembly election: Thavanur
Party	Candidate	Votes	%	±%
LDF	K. T. Jaleel	69,358	46.46	▼1.51
INC	Firos Kunnamparambil	67,794	44.77	▲8.81
BDJS	Ramesh Kottayapurath	9,914	6.55	▼4.62
SDPI	Hassan Chiyanoor	1,747	1.15	▼0.71
NOTA	None of the above	478	0.32	−
Independent	Jaleel	308	0.2	−
Independent	Vellarikkat Mohammed Rafi	227	0.15	−
Independent	Firos Kunnathparambil	194	0.13	−
Independent	Firos Paruvingal	175	0.12	−
Independent	Mohammed Firos Nurukkuprambil	152	0.1	−
Independent	Firos Nellamkunnath	79	0.05	−
Margin of victory		2,185	1.69	▼1.51
Turnout		1,51,426	75.72	▼1.16
LDF hold		Swing	▼1.51	

=== 2016 ===
There were 1,84,868 registered voters in Thavanur Assembly constituency for the 2016 Kerala Assembly election.

2016 Kerala Legislative Assembly election: Thavanur
Party	Candidate	Votes	%	±%
LDF	K. T. Jaleel	68,179	47.97	▲0.77
INC	Ifthiquarudheen Master	51,115	35.96	▼5.64
BJP	Ravi Thelath	15,801	11.12	▲5.31
SDPI	P. K. Jaleel Parakkuzhiyil	2,649	1.86	▼0.69
PDP	Ali Kadampuzha	1,077	0.76	−
WPOI	Muhammed Ponnani	1,000	0.71	−
Independent	Ifthikarudheen P. P.	601	0.42	−
NOTA	None of the above	473	0.33	−
Independent	Appunni O. V.	443	0.31	−
Margin of victory		17,064	12.01	▲6.41
Turnout		1,42,125	76.88	▼1.27
LDF hold		Swing	▲0.77	

=== 2011 ===
There were 1,56,486 registered voters in the constituency for the 2011 election.

2011 Kerala Legislative Assembly election: Thavanur
Party	Candidate	Votes	%	±%
LDF	K. T. Jaleel	57,729	47.20	
INC	V. V. Prakash	50,875	41.60	
BJP	Nirmala Kuttikrishnan Punnakkal	7,107	5.81	
SDPI	Nurul Hack	3,116	2.55	
Independent	T. A. Jaleel	820	0.67	
Independent	T. K. Jaleel	768	0.63	
BSP	Nanda Kumar	531	0.43	
Margin of victory		6,854	5.60	
Turnout		1,22,297	78.15	
LDF win (new seat)				

== See also ==
- Thavanur
- Malappuram district
- List of constituencies of the Kerala Legislative Assembly
- 2016 Kerala Legislative Assembly election
