= Purathur =

- Village
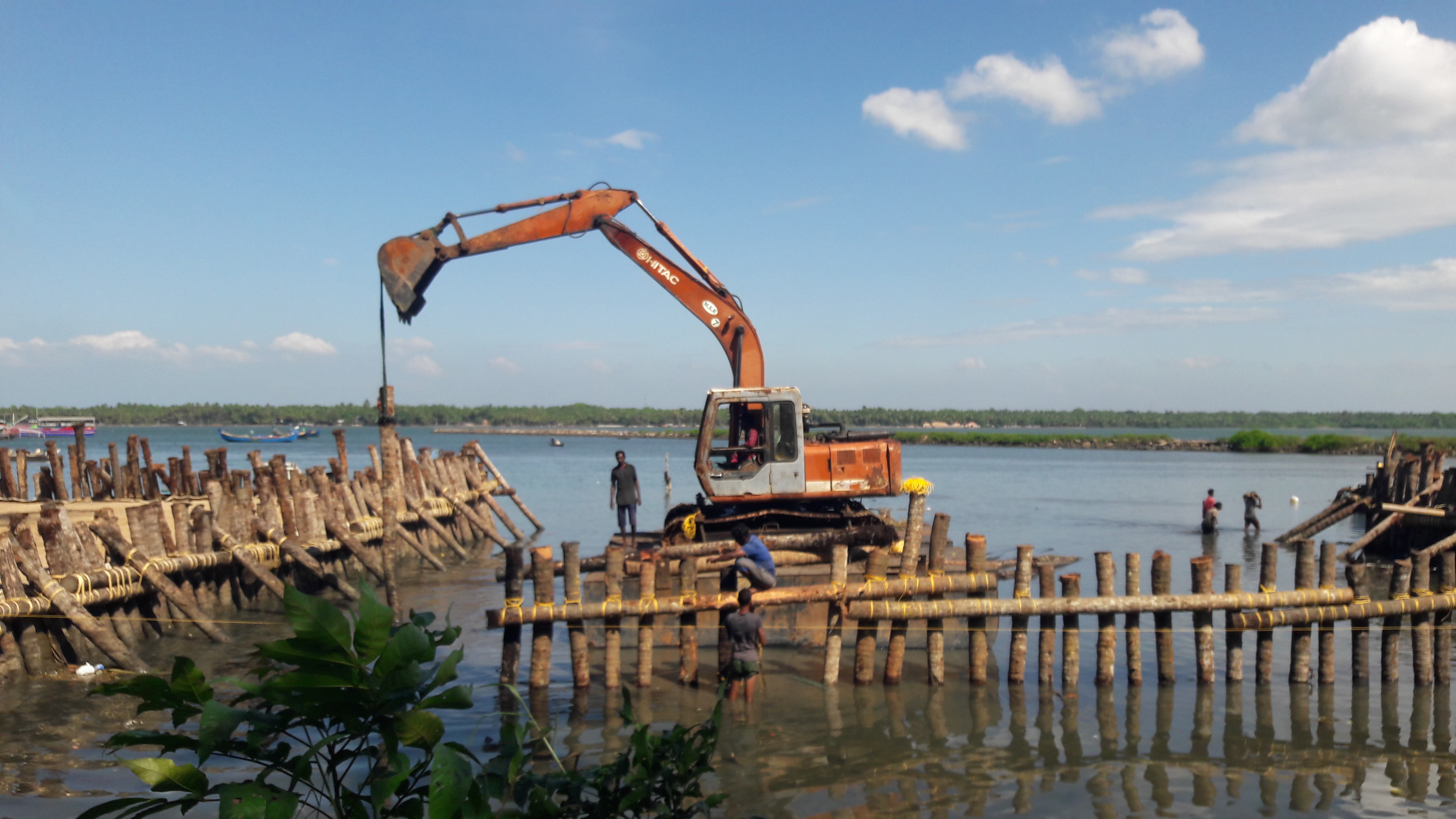
- Padinjarekara Azhimukham at Purathur where the river Bharathappuzha and Tirur River merge together and empties into Arabian Sea (Opposite side is Ponnani port)

- Location in Kerala, India
- Coordinates: 10°48′08″N 75°55′21″E
- Country: India
- State: Kerala
- District: Malappuram
- Established: December - 1964

Government
  - Body: Panchayath

Area
  - Total: 19.15 km^{2} (7.39 sq mi)

Population (2011)
  - Total: 31,915
  - Density: 1,667/km^{2} (4,316/sq mi)

Languages
  - Official: Malayalam, English
- Time zone: UTC+5:30 (IST)
- PIN: 676102 & 676561
- Telephone code: 0494-256
- Vehicle registration: KL-55

Purathur is a sandy coastal village and a Grama Panchayat in Tirur Taluk, Malappuram district in the state of Kerala, India. Bharathappuzha river and Tirur River merges together in Purathur and join with the Arabian Sea at Padinjarekara Azhimukham, which is also the southernmost tip of Purathur Gram panchayat. Opposite to Padinjarekara Azhimukham is Ponnani port. The village is located at the southernmost tip of Tirur Taluk and is bordered by historically important Ponnani port in Ponnani Municipality of Ponnani taluk to south (Opposite to Padinjarekara Azhimukham).

== Geography ==
Purathur Grama Panchayat is bounded by waterbodies. It is bounded by Arabian Sea to west, and Bharathappuzha River to southeast and south. On north, it is bounded by Mangalam Grama panchayat, and on the east by Triprangode Grama panchayat. The Tirur River, which passes through middle of village, separates the village into two parts - a coastal area and an inland area. Mangroves are widely seen in the coastal area. Migratory Birds also arrive here. A bird sanctuary at Purathur was proposed in 2010.

== Demographics ==
As of 2011 India census, Purathur village had a population of 31,915, of whom 15,062 were males while 16,853 were females. The population of children aged 0–6 was 4,290, which made up 13.44% of the total population of the village. The average sex ratio of Purathur village was 1,119, higher than the Kerala state average of 1,084. The child sex ratio for Purathur was 1,008, higher than the Kerala average of 964.

== Wards ==
Purathur Grama Panchayat

Purathur Grama Panchayat is composed of the following 20 wards:

Ward no.	Name	Ward no.	Name
1	Pandazhi	2	Muttannur
3	Muttannur East	4	Chirakkal
5	Maravantha	6	Athanipadi
7	Puthuppalli	8	Kuttikkad
9	Thrithaloor South	10	Ezhipadam
11	Kaloor	12	Munambam
13	Purathur	14	Kavilakkad South
15	Kavilakkad	16	Thrithallur
17	Edakkanad	18	Azhimukham
19	Padinjarekkara	20	Pandazhi

== Border local bodies ==
- East - Triprangode Panchayath, Bharathappuzha (Ponnani Municipality)
- West - Arabian Sea
- South - Bharatha puzha (Ponnani Municipality)
- North - Mangalam and Thripangode panchayaths

== Transportation ==
Purathur village connects to other parts of India through Kuttippuram town and Chamravattam. National highway No. 66 passes through Edappal and the northern stretch connects to Goa and Mumbai. The southern stretch connects to Cochin and Trivandrum. National Highway No. 966 connects to Palakkad and Coimbatore. Another connection point is Chamravattom, 4 km away from Purathur.

KSRTC buses run between Ernakulam-Malappuram, Tirur-Ponnani, Calicut-Guruvayur, Calicut-Ernakulam, Calicut-Alleppey, Calicut-Thiruvananthapuram, and Ponnani-Bangalore. A large number of KSRTC buses including super fast passenger, super fast, town-to-town, limited stop and ordinary buses run through Chamravattam.

The nearest airport is at Karippur (Kozhikode).

The nearest major railway station is located at Tirur.

== Temples ==
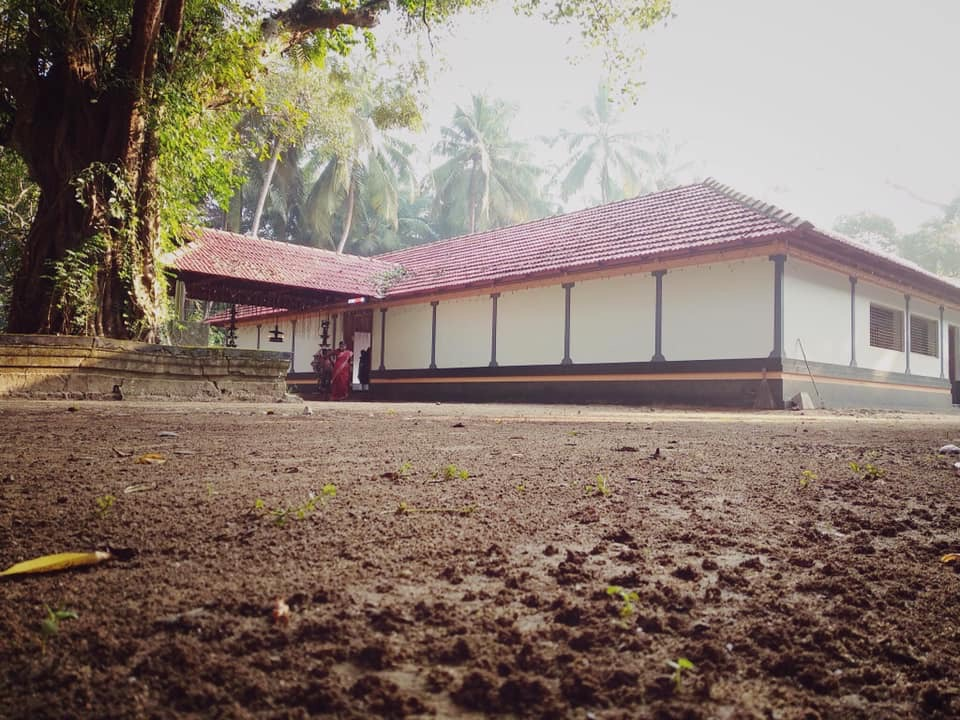
Bhayankavu Bhagavathi Temple

The Hindu Bhayankavu Bhagavathi Temple is the major temple in Purathur village. It is a sacred Bhagavathi temple on the Alathiyoor Pallikadavu Road in Edakkanad, about 14 km from Tirur town.

The temple is dedicated to the goddess Bhagavathi. Three main festivals are celebrated in Bhayankavu. The first one is on Thulam 1 (the middle of the month of October). The second one is known as 'Makarachovva' (the second Tuesday of Malayalam month 'Makaram'). The annual Thalappoli ritual in the temple is observed according to the Malayalam calendar in the Kumbham month.

== Tourism ==
The Tirur-Kootayi road ends at Padinjarekara (Purathur), better known as Padinjarekara Azhimugham, where the Bharathapuzha and Tirur Rivers converge to drain into the sea. This place is noted for migratory birds, gathering in their thousands during February - April. This beach is very near Tirur and is also known for its scenery. This beach has long been a destination for both domestic and international travellers as well as nature lovers.

== See also ==
- Mangalam
- Triprangode
- Chamravattam
- Ponnani
- Tirur Taluk
- Tirur River
- Bharathappuzha
- Kadalundi Bird Sanctuary
