= Thalakkad =

- Census town
- Location in Kerala, India Thalakkad (India)
- Coordinates: 10°53′0″N 75°56′0″E
- Country: India
- State: Kerala
- District: Malappuram

Population (2011)
  - Total: 35,820

Languages
  - Official: Malayalam, English
- Time zone: UTC+5:30 (IST)
- PIN: 676551
- Vehicle registration: KL-55, KL-10

Thalakkad is a census town in Malappuram district in the state of Kerala, India.

== Demographics ==
As of 2011 India census, Thalakkad had a population of 35,820, with 16,578 males and 19,242 females. KL-55 is the RTO vehicle registration code of Talakkad Panchayat.

== Important places in Thalakkad Panchayath ==
- B P Angadi town (Bettathu Pudiyangadi)
- Mangattiri bridge at Mangattiri over Tirur River

B P Angadi is a suburban town of Tirur Municipality. Thalakkad Grama panchayat can be considered as the southern portion of Tirur city.

== Wards of Thalakkad ==
Thalakkad Grama Panchayat

Thalakkad Grama Panchayat is composed of the following 19 wards:

Ward no.	Name	Ward no.	Name
1	Mangattiri	2	Kattachira
3	Karayil	4	Pullur
5	Pullural	6	Kanhirikol
7	Vadakkan Kuttoor	8	Thekkan Kuttoor
9	Mukkilapeedika	10	Vengaloor
11	Koloopalam	12	Kottathara
13	B P Angadi Town	14	Parassery East
15	Parassery West	16	Pookaitha
17	B P Angadi	18	Vadakke Angadi
19	Kallookadavu		

== Transportation ==
Thalakkad village connects to other parts of India through Tirur and Kuttippuram towns. National Highway No. 66 passes through Tirur, and the northern stretch connects to Goa and Mumbai. The southern stretch connects to Cochin and Trivandrum. Highway No. 966 leads to Palakkad and Coimbatore. The nearest airport is at Kozhikode, and the nearest major railway station is at Tirur.

== See also ==
- B P Angadi
- Thekkan Kuttur
- Pullur
- Pachattiri
- Vettom
- Tirur
