= V. S Joy =

Indian politician from Kerala (born 1986)

Adv. V. S. Joy
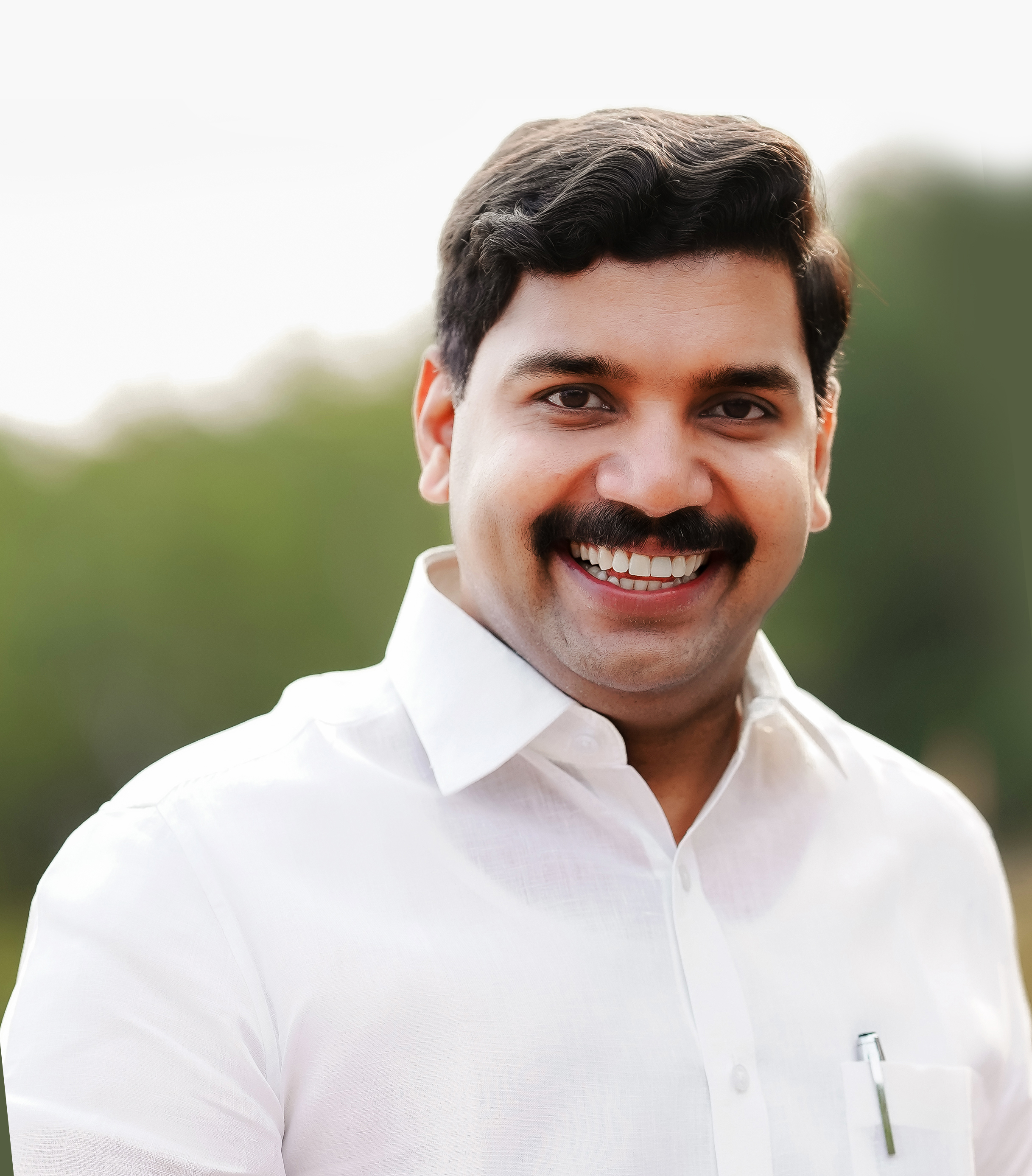

Member of the Kerala Legislative Assembly
- Incumbent
- Assumed office May 2026
- Preceded by: K. T. Jaleel
- Constituency: Thavanur

Personal details
- Born: V. S. Joy; 1986 (age 39–40) Malappuram district, Kerala, India
- Party: Indian National Congress
- Parent: Seviour (father)
- Education: LLB (Government Law College, Kozhikode)
- Occupation: Advocate, Politician
- Website: https://vsjoy.co.in/

Adv. V. Seviour Joy (born 1986) is an Indian politician and lawyer currently serving as the member of the legislative assembly (MLA) for the Thavanur constituency in the Kerala Legislative Assembly. A member of the Indian National Congress, he was elected in the 2026 Kerala Legislative Assembly election, ending the decade-long tenure of the incumbent, K. T. Jaleel.

== Early life and education ==
V. S. Joy was born in the Malappuram district. He completed his secondary education at the Board of Public Examination in 2002 and his higher secondary education in 2004. He pursued a legal career, obtaining his LLB from the Government Law College, Kozhikode in 2012. Before his election to the Legislative Assembly, he was an active member of the Kerala Students Union (KSU) and the Indian Youth Congress.

== Political career ==
Joy rose through the ranks of the Congress party's youth wings, eventually serving as the president of the Malappuram District Congress Committee (DCC).

In the 2026 Kerala Assembly elections, Joy was fielded by the Congress in Thavanur, a seat previously considered a stronghold for the LDF-backed Independent candidate K. T. Jaleel. Joy won the seat with a margin of 14,647 votes, polling a total of 79,661 votes. His victory was seen as a major success for the Congress party in the Malappuram district.

== Election results ==
=== 2026 Kerala Legislative Assembly election ===
Party	Candidate	Votes	%	±%	
	INC	Adv. V. S. Joy	79,661	48.61	+3.84
	Independent (LDF)	K. T. Jaleel	65,014	39.67	-6.79
	BJP	Ravi Thelath	16,039	9.79	+1.20
	SDPI	Abdul Jaleel (S/O Kadheeja)	2,021	1.23	-0.15
NOTA		1,148	0.70	-	
Margin of victory		14,647	8.94		
Total valid votes		1,63,883			
INC gain from Independent		Swing	+5.32		
