= Keraladeshpuram Temple =

Religion
- Affiliation: Hinduism
- District: Malappuram district
- Deity: Vishnu

Location
- Location: Thanur
- State: Kerala
- Country: India

Keraladeshapuram Temple in Thanur, Malappuram District is one of the oldest Hindu temples in Kerala state, South India, dating back to 3000 years.

The temple is dedicated to Hindu god Vishnu, and is situated about 3 km south of Thanur town. Thanur, a coastal town on the Malabar Coast, was one of the earliest settlements of the Portuguese explorers. It is believed that St. Francis Xavier visited the Keraladeshpuram Temple place in 1546 AD. It was a part of kingdom of Vettattnad in medieval times.

Now this temple is a part of the Malabar Devaswam board kerala. Keralrdesapuram is a place where the name Kerala was added even before the formation of Kerala. Keraladeshwarapuram itself is important in Hindu mythology. The place is located in the center of Kerala, which is believed to have been created by Parshuram's ax throwing.

== See also ==
- Thanur
- Malappuram district
