= Bhayankavu Bhagavathi Temple =

Hindu temple in Kerala, India

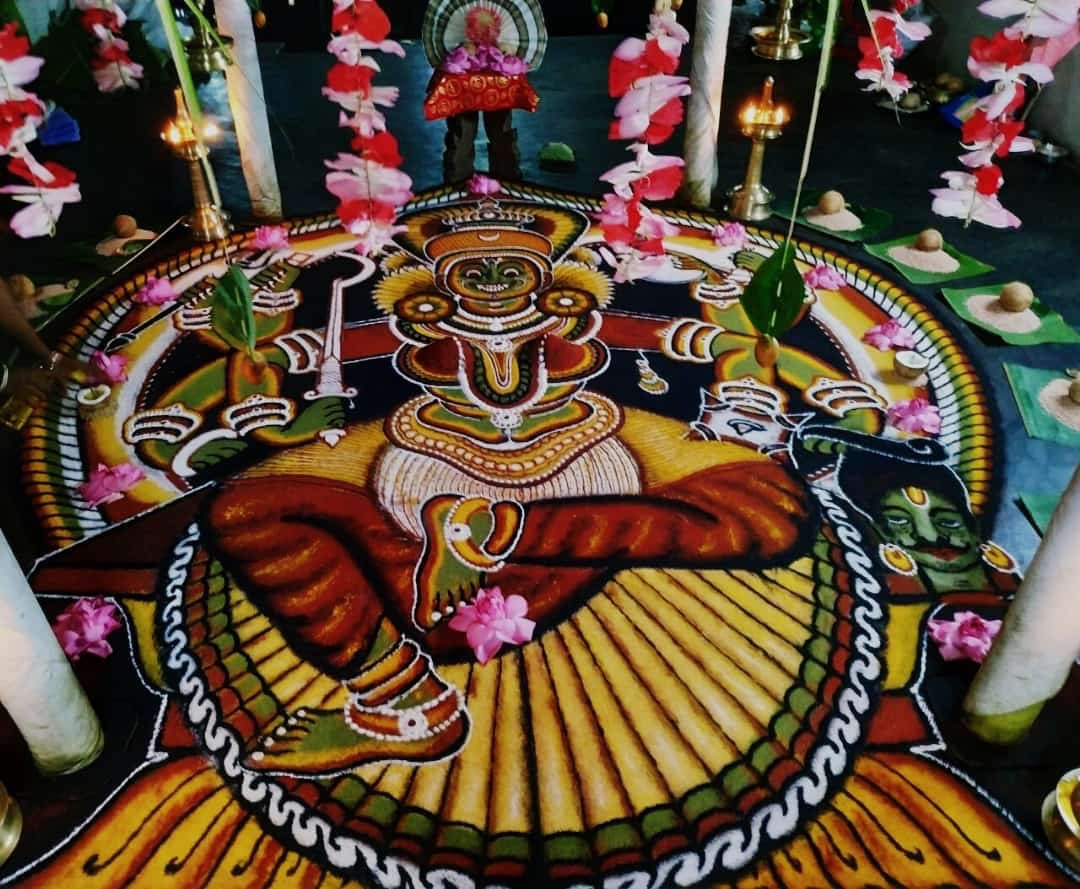

- Bhayankavu Bhagavathy Temple, Purathur, Malappuram, Kerala

Religion
- Affiliation: Hinduism
- District: Malappuram
- Deity: Bhagavati
- Festival: Thalappoli

Location
- Location: Purathur
- State: Kerala
- Country: India
- Coordinates: 10.818917°N 75.921749°E

Architecture
- Type: Architecture of Kerala

Specifications
- Temple: One
- Elevation: 28.07 m (92 ft)

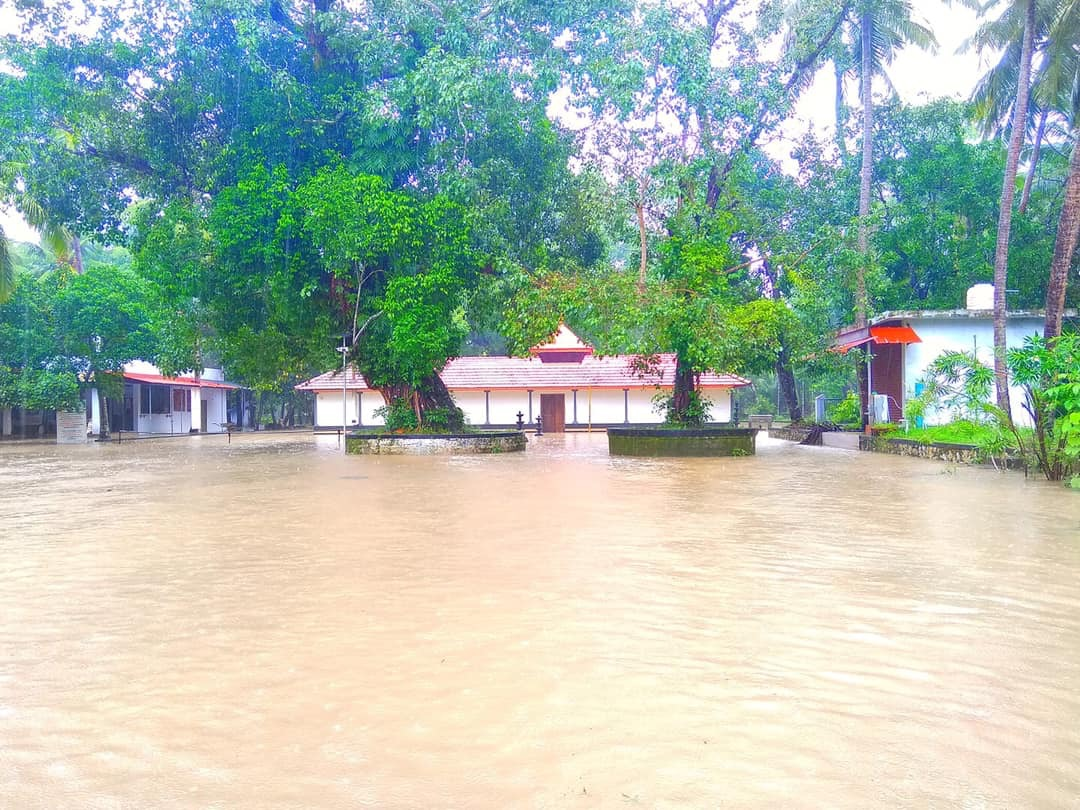
Bhayankavu Bhagavathi Temple during Kerala flood 2018

Bhayankavu Bhagavathi Temple is a very sacred Hindu Bhagavathi temple on the Alathiyoor Pallikadavu Road in Kavilakkad, Purathur, Tirur situated in Malappuram district, about 14 km from Tirur Railway Station.

== Deity ==
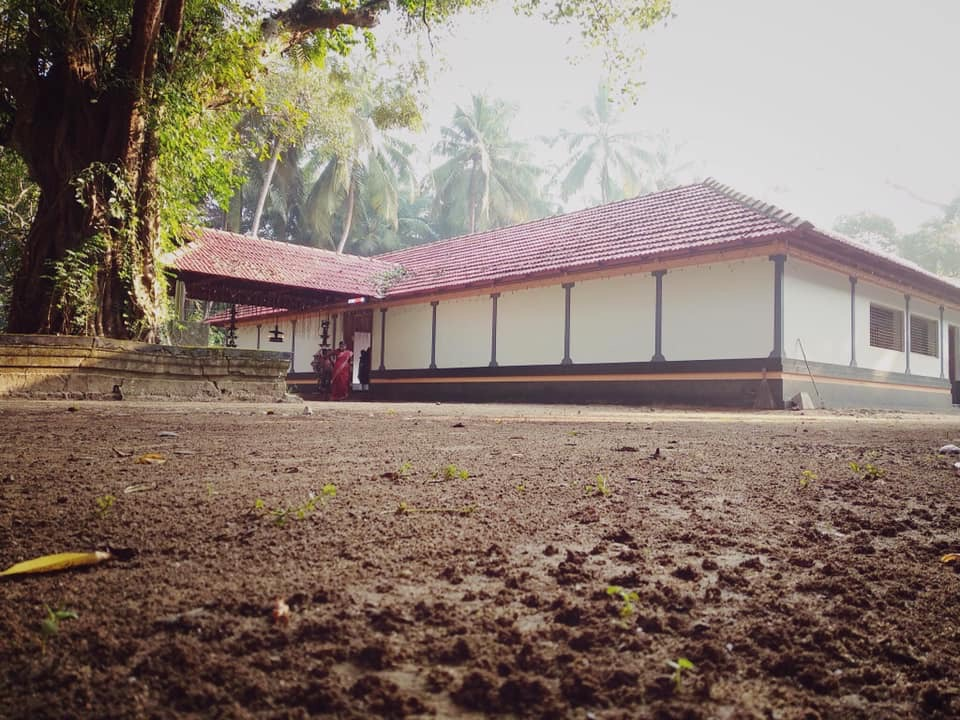
Bhayankavu Bhagavathi Temple

The temple is dedicated to the goddess Bhagavathi. The square sanctum sanctorum of the temple has a granite idol of Mother Goddess. There are upa devatas and chuttambalam.

Three main festivals are celebrated in Bhayankavu. The first one is on Thulam 1st (the middle of the month of October). The second one is known as 'Makarachovva' (first Tuesday of Malayalam month 'Makaram'.) The third one is the annual Thalappoli ritual in the temple which is observed according to the Malayalam calendar.

During the 'Thalappoli' festival, the ritual 'Pavakkooth' (a shadow play like doll-play, but where only the shadows of different characters of Hindu deities can be seen) is conducted in the temple throughout the month of 'Kumbam' (normally 16 February to 15 March). During these days, "Kalamezhuthu" is conducted in the Temple.

The coloured powders used for the kolam are prepared from natural products only. The pigments are extracted from plants - rice flour (white), charcoal powder (black), turmeric powder (yellow), powdered green leaves (green), and a mixture of turmeric powder and lime (red). It often takes more than two hours to finish a kolam drawing with appealing perfection. Decorations like a canopy of palm fronds, garlands of red hibiscus flowers and thulasi or Ocimum leaves are hung above the kolam.

== Other rituals ==
The festival is also famous for the participation of hundreds of girls and women. They carry the thalappoli in procession. Poothan and Thira folk are also part of the festival – a head gear with Bhagavathy and other deities. The big headgear is balanced on head using a cotton cloth known as thorthu.

Various kolam and effigies are part of the annual festival.

During the festival, women carry lighted lamps and move in a procession to the temple for peace and prosperity. Normally, hundreds of devotees participate to witness this important ritual in the temple.
