= Pudiyangadi, Tirur =

Bettath Pudiyangadi B.P Angadi
- Village
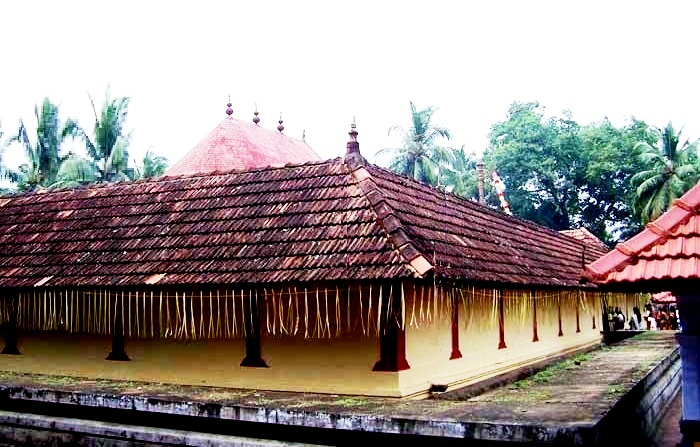
- Thripangodu Temple

- Location in Kerala, India
- Coordinates: 10.886664°N 75.927415°E
- Country: India
- State: Kerala
- District: Malappuram

Government
  - Body: Thalakkad Grama Panchayat

Languages
  - Official: Malayalam, English
- Time zone: UTC+5:30 (IST)
- PIN: 676102
- Vehicle registration: KL-55
- Nearest town: Tirur
- Lok Sabha constituency: Ponnani

Pudiyangadi (also known as Bettath Pudiyangadi or BP Angadi) is a village near Tirur in Malappuram district of Kerala, India. This village was the part of the Kingdom of Tanur (Vettattnad) in medieval times.

== Transportation ==
Pudiyangadi village connects to other parts of India through Tirur and Kuttippuram towns. NH 66 passes through Kuttipuram and the northern stretch connects to Goa and Mumbai. The southern stretch connects to Cochin and Trivandrum. The nearest airport is at Kozhikode. The nearest railway station is at Tirur.
