= Chamravattom Regulator-cum-Bridge =

Bridge in Kerala, India

Chamravattam Regulator cum Bridge
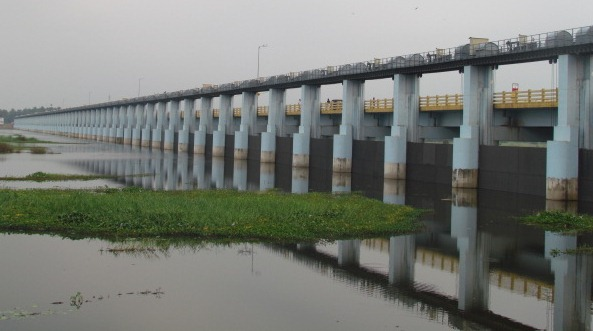
- Coordinates: 10.819967°N 75.959263°E
- Carries: Road
- Crosses: Bharathapuzha River
- Locale: Chamravattam, Triprangode, Malappuram
- Other name: Ponnani - Tirur Bridge

Characteristics
- Material: Concrete
- Total length: 978 m (3,209 ft)
- Width: 10.5 m (34 ft)

History
- Inaugurated: 17 May 2012

Location
- Interactive map of Chamravattam Regulator cum Bridge

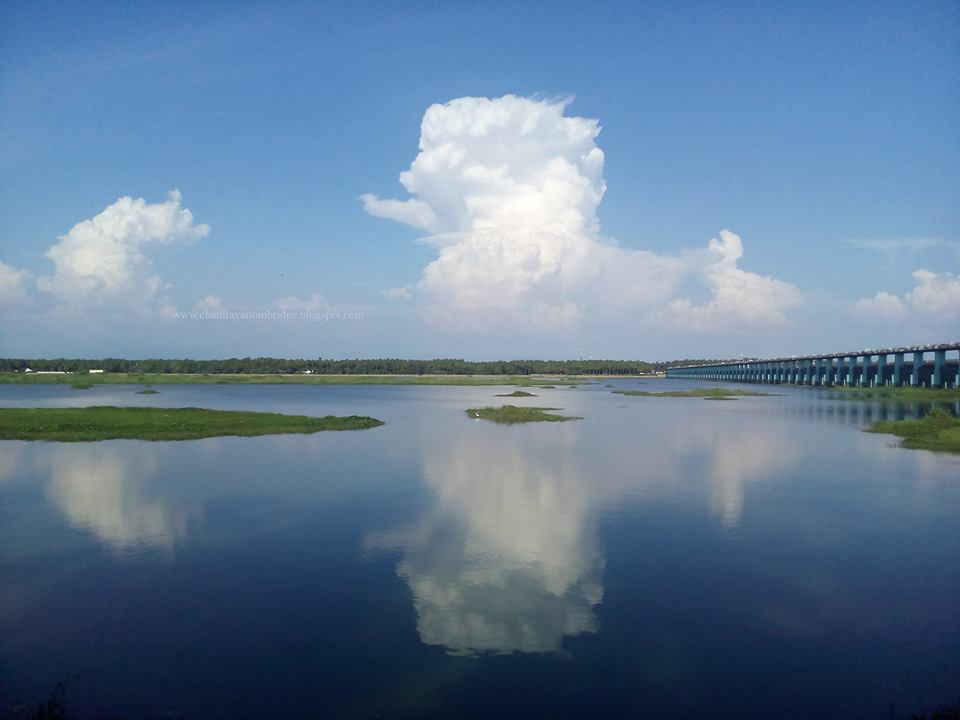
View of Chamravattam Regulator-cum-Bridge

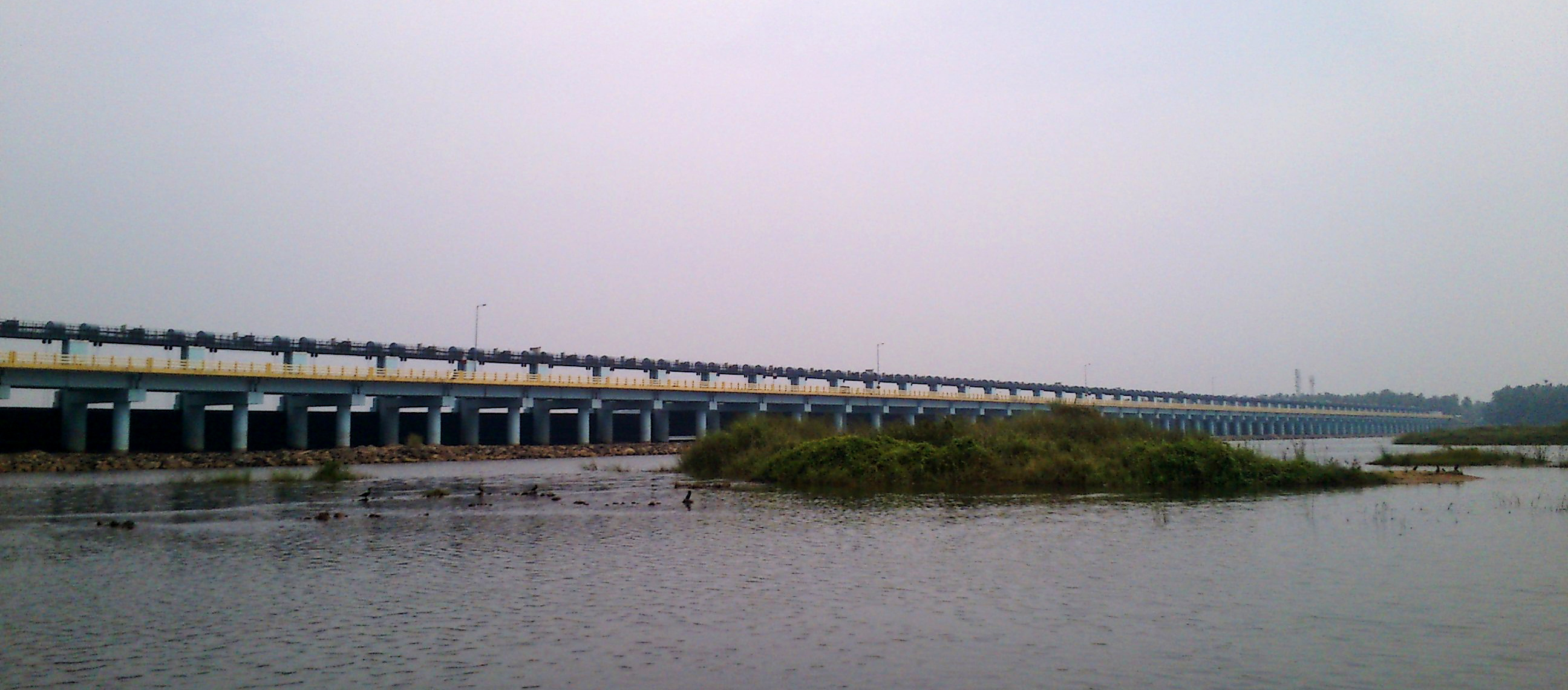

The Chamravattam Regulator-cum-Bridge, also known as Chamravattam Palam or Chamravattam Bridge, Chamravattam RcB, or Chamravattam Project, is built across the Bharathapuzha aka Nila near Chamravattam, Triprangode, in Malappuram district. This seems to be the largest of its type in the world. The bridge has 978 m (3,209 ft) length and 10.5 m (34 ft) width. It connects Ponnani and Tirur. Regulator cum bridge is now just working as a bridge due to faulty design as per the conclusion in the detailed technical investigation report done by the Indian Institute of Technology, Delhi on the directions of the Government of Kerala. There is also a false allegation that sand for construction was taken from river without payment for the same though the sand was paid for by the contractors at prices fixed by the Government of Kerala. This price was based on the prevailing sand prices in the open market and arrived at by the revenue department of Kerala. On account of these false allegations, the contractors for the work are yet to be paid in full for this work though it’s been nearing a decade since the work has been completed and the bridge has been used on a 24/7 basis throughout.

The Chamravattam Bridge was inaugurated by the Chief Minister of Kerala, Oommen Chandy, on 17 May 2012. This project has dual goals of irrigation and reducing the distance by road between Kozhikode and Kochi by 38 km (24 mi). The project was conceptualized as early as 1977 or 1984, but was dormant for some time.

The foundation stone for the project was laid by then Chief Minister V. S. Achuthanandan on 13 September 2009. The project cost is estimated at ₹130 crore (US$14 million).

== See also ==
- Triprangode
- Ponnani
- Kuttippuram bridge
