= Pullur, Malappuram =

Pullur pulloor
- hamlet
- Country: India
- State: Kerala
- District: Malappuram

Population (2001)
  - Total: 30,577

Languages
  - Official: Malayalam, English
- Time zone: UTC+5:30 (IST)
- PIN: 676551
- Vehicle registration: KL-55, KL-10

Pullur or "Pulloor" is a village in Thalakkad near the town of Tirur, in Malappuram district in the state of Kerala, India.
