= Kuttippala =

Village in Kerala, India

Coordinates: 10.967°N 75.961°E

Kuttippala is a village in Malappuram district of Kerala which is situated 8 km (5 mi) from Tirur on the way to Kottakkal and is a junction which leads to Kurukkol and Kozhichena.

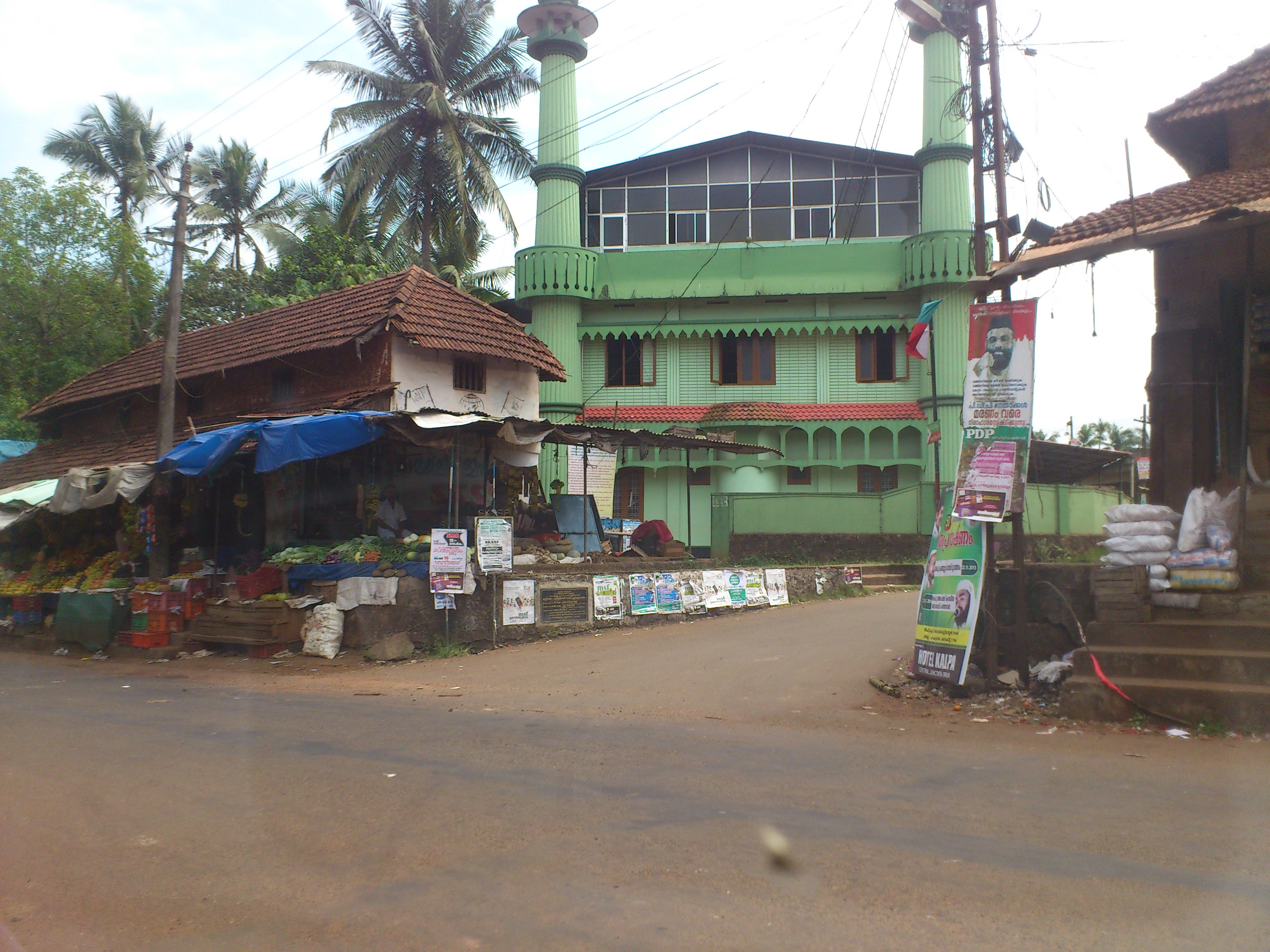
Kuttippala Juma masjid in the backdrop

== Education ==
There are two schools near the village: Government UP School Kuttippala and Garden Valley English Medium School.

== Village profile ==
The Perumanna panchayath office is 500 meters down the road towards Kottakkal. Kuttippala Juma masjid is situated amidst the village, and the Clari temple is 700 meters from the town towards east. This temple is known for its yearly carnival. Major family groups staying in this region are Thondiyil, Kavarodi, Thadathil, Chenganakkattil, Pilathottathil, Manningal, Elayi Parammal etc. The village has good living facilities (grocery shops, salons, medicine stores, Gulf Bazaar, restaurants, duty-free shop, automobile service centre ). Nearby villages draining to this town are: Klari South, Klari Kannikuzhingara, Kavungilappadi, Kunnathiyil. Perumanna, Klari, Klari Puthur, Klari Chenakkal and part of Ponmundam.

== Transportation ==
Kuttippala village connects to other parts of India through Tirur town. National highway No.66 passes through Tirur and the northern stretch connects to Goa and Mumbai. The southern stretch connects to Cochin and Trivandrum. Highway No.966 goes to Palakkad and Coimbatore. The nearest airport is at Kozhikode. The nearest major railway station is at Tirur.
