= Thekkan Kuttur =

- Village
- Location in Kerala, India Thekkan Kuttur (India)
- Coordinates: 10.886667°N 75.976111°E
- Country: India
- State: Kerala
- District: Malappuram

Languages
  - Official: Malayalam
- Time zone: UTC+5:30 (IST)
- PIN: 676 102
- Telephone code: 572
- Vehicle registration: KL-10/KL-55
- Nearest city: Tirur
- Lok Sabha constituency: Tirur

Thekkan Kuttur or Tekkan Kuttur is a place in Malappuram district of Kerala in India. Its under Tirur block and Thalakkad village.

== Demographics ==
Around 4,000 people are living here. There is a Shiva Temple named "Pazhayeadath-Sivakshethram" another small temple is also there which named as "Puthiyeadath-Kshethram".

== Education ==
There are two schools named A.M.L.P.S and G.L.P.S. Thekkan Kuttur is extended to Kuttur Desom which is unofficially known as Vadakkan Kuttur. There is another school Devi Sahayam Lower Primary School in Kuttur.

== Economy ==
This village is predominantly occupied by people working in Gulf Countries.

== Temples ==
There are three more temples in Kuttur. A very ancient Parthasarathy Temple which was maintained by Namboodiris during the last century.

Another is the Anthimahakalan Temple, which is the family temple of Amassam Veetil. An ancient Nair Tharavad located at Kuttur. An ancient Bhagavathy temple known to be maintained directly by kings of Vettathu nadu, also exists between Kuttur and Pothanur (nearby village). This Bagavathy temple has many surprising and interesting traditions, and oracles (Velichappadu) still profess during specific festivals.

== Festivals ==
Daily pujas are done by Mannan community (OBC). All sects of Hindu fraternity participate in rituals wholeheartedly at this temple. It is said that Muslims also participate and co-operate in all the festivals.

== Transportation ==
Thekkankuttoor village connects to other parts of India through Tirur town. National highway No.66 passes through Tirur and the northern stretch connects to Goa and Mumbai. The southern stretch connects to Cochin and Trivandrum. Highway No.966 goes to Palakkad and Coimbatore. The nearest airport is at Kozhikode. The nearest major railway station is at Tirur.
