= Tirur River =

River in India

Coordinates: 10°48′N 75°55′E

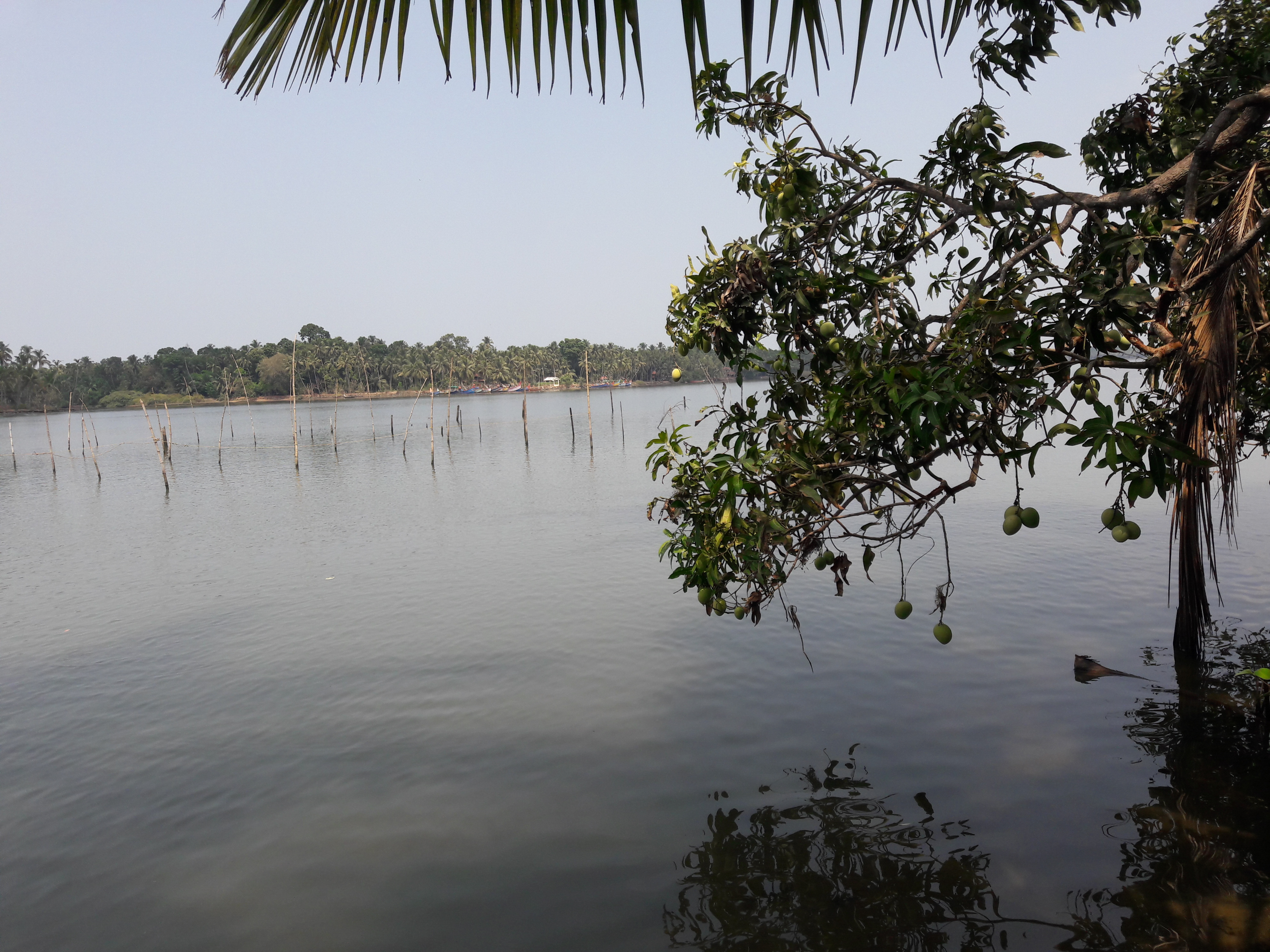
The Tirur River

The Tirur River or Tirur-Ponnani River begins in the Tirur taluk village of Athavanad in the Malappuram district of the state of Kerala in south India and flows south-west to Thirunavaya and then north-west to Elamkulam where it turns south-west at Alinchuvadu and passes through Tirur town, and finally joins the Bharathapuzha River, which flows into the Arabian Sea near the coastal town of Ponnani. It is known for its beautiful mangroves and its many varieties of fishes and birds.

This river is navigable and forms part of the west coast water transport system. Its length is 48 kilometres (30 mi). Thunchaththu Ramanujan Ezhuthachan - the father of Malayalam literature was born and brought up on the banks of this river and his birthplace at Thunjan Parambu is situated very near to the river and the place is called Annaradesam and Trikkandiyoor amsom in the former Kingdom of Tanur (Vettattunad). Vallathol Narayana Menon, poet and the founder of Kerala Kalamandalam, was also born on the banks of this river. Many of the main members of the medieval Kerala School of Astronomy and Mathematics, including Melpathur Narayana Bhattathiri, were also born near Tirur River.

== Gallery ==
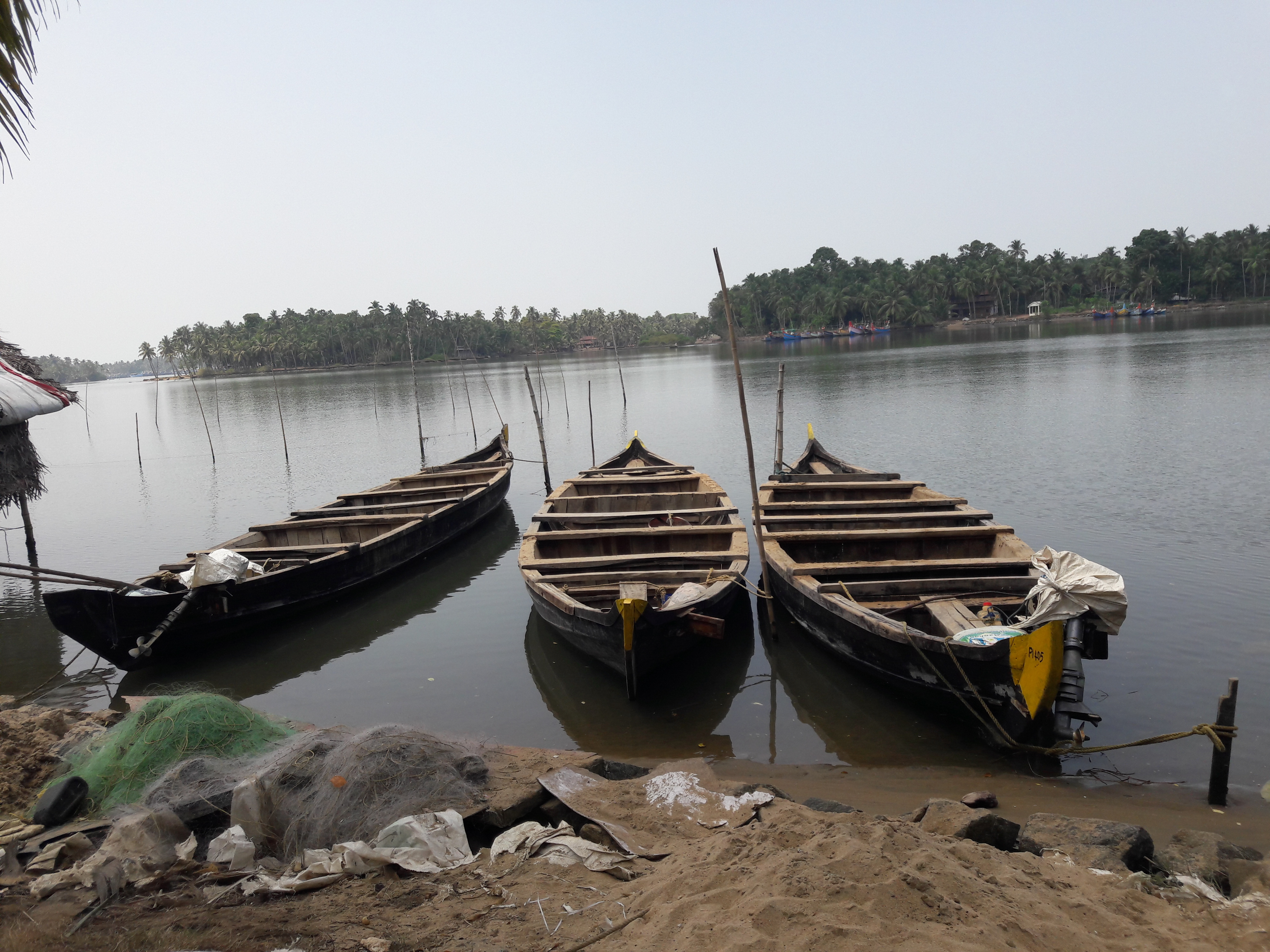
Tirur River

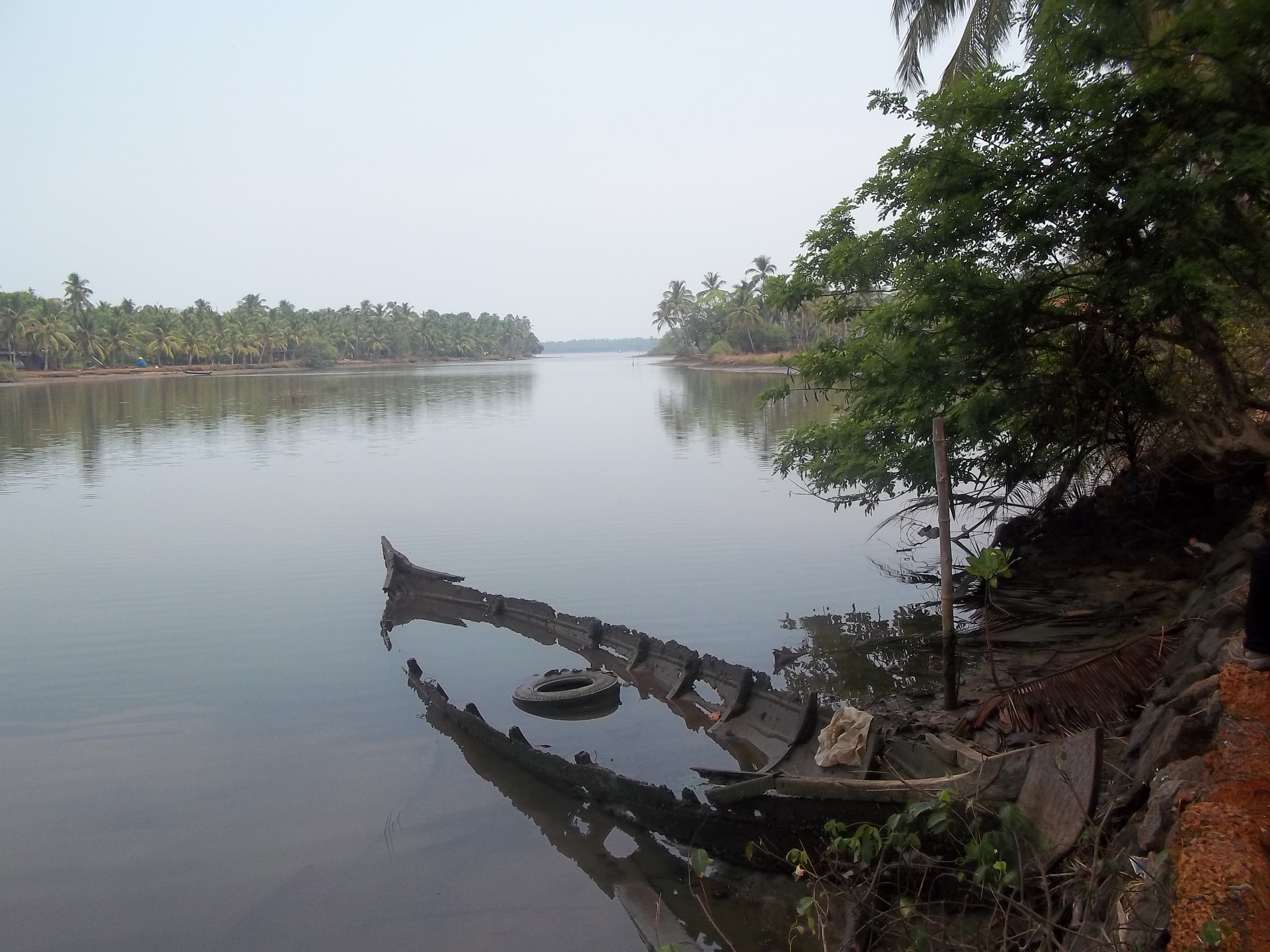
Tirur River

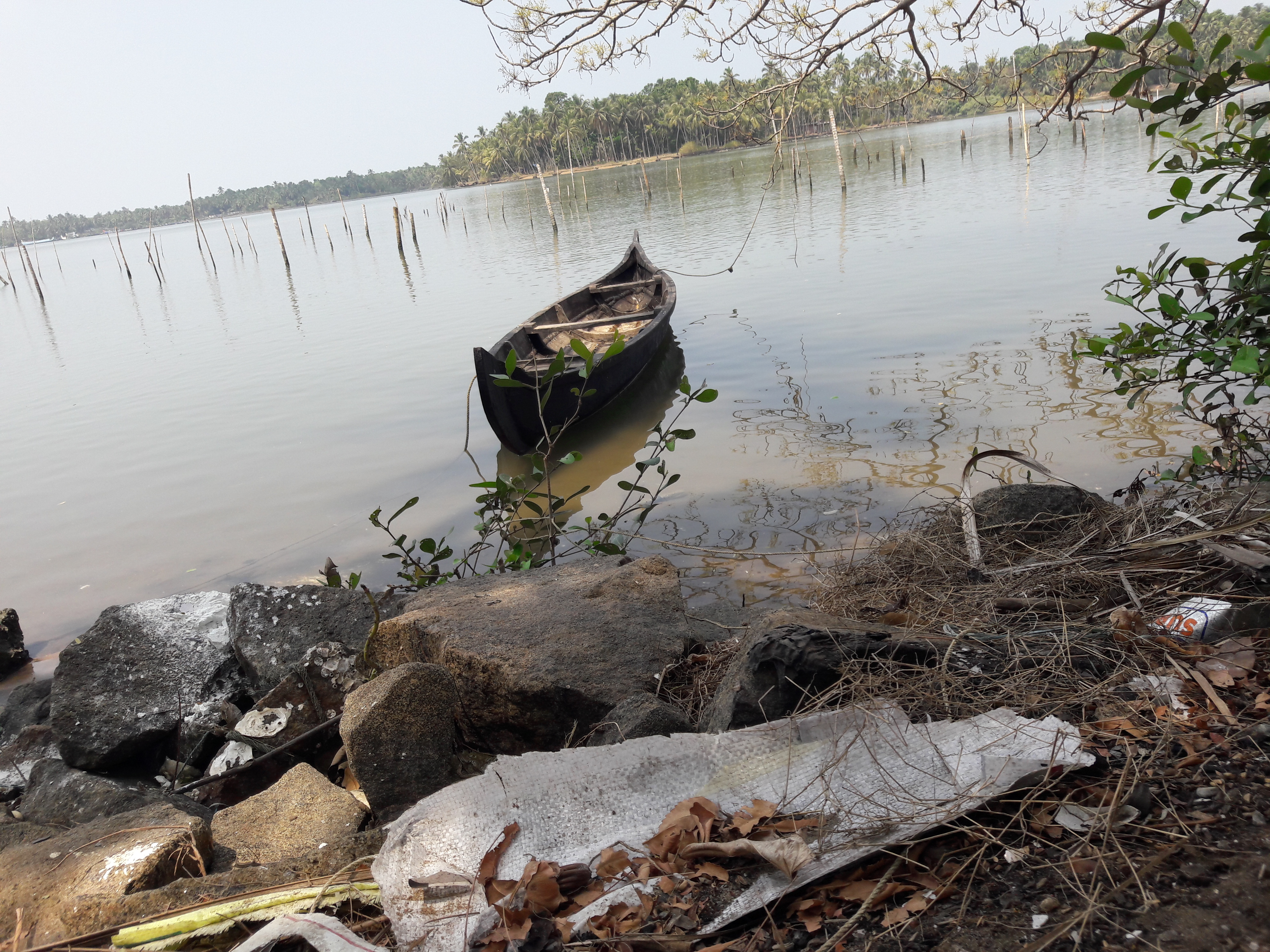
Tirur River
