= Chamravattam =

- Village
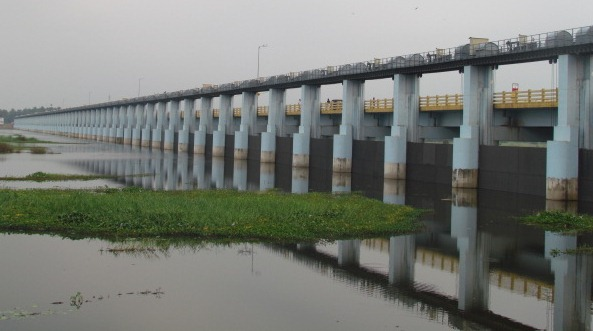
- Chamravattam Bridge
- Interactive map of Chamravattam
- Coordinates: 10.818885°N 75.952781°E
- Country: India
- State: Kerala
- District: Malappuram

Languages
  - Official: Malayalam, English
- Time zone: UTC+5:30 (IST)
- Vehicle registration: KL-10, KL-54&KL-55
- Lok Sabha constituency: Ponnani

Chamravattam is a village located in Malappuram district, Kerala, India. This village is on the shores of the Bharathapuzha.

== Computer Literacy ==
With the fulfillment of the Akshaya Project, initiated by the Kerala State Information Technology Mission and completed in 2003, Chamaravattam was the first 100% computer-literate village in the nation of India. At least one member of each of the 850 families residing in the village at the time received computer literacy training, allowing them to use a personal computer for tasks such as editing pictures, composing text, browsing the Internet and sending emails.

== Chamravattam Regulator-cum-Bridge ==
This also known as Chamravattam Palam or Chamravattam Bridge or Chamravattam Regulator-cum-Bridge or Chamravattam RcB or just Chamravattam Project. Chamravattam Regulator-cum-Bridge, is built across Bharathapuzha aka Nila. The bridge has 978 m length and 10.5 m width. It connects Ponnani and Tirur.
