= Triprangode =

- village
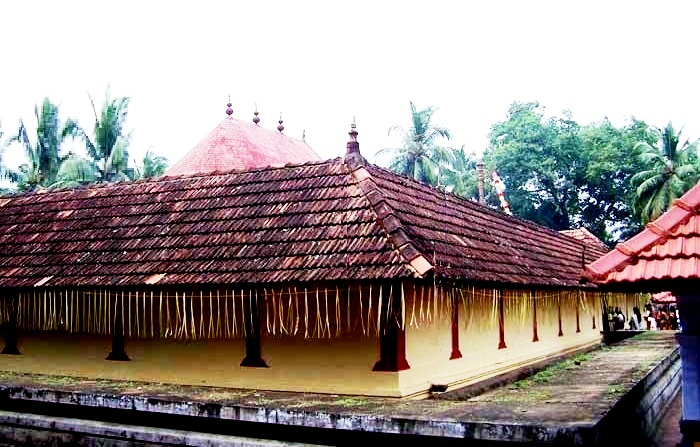
- Shiva temple at Thripangodu
- Interactive map of Triprangode
- Country: India
- State: Kerala
- District: Malappuram

Government
  - Body: Triprangode Panchayath

Area
  - Total: 20.67 km^{2} (7.98 sq mi)

Population (2011)
  - Total: 41,167
  - Density: 1,992/km^{2} (5,158/sq mi)

Languages
  - Official: Malayalam, English
- Time zone: UTC+5:30 (IST)
- PIN: 676108
- Telephone code: 0494-256****
- Vehicle registration: KL-55
- Nearest city: Tirur
- Literacy: 92.96%
- Lok Sabha constituency: Ponnani
- Vidhan Sabha constituency: Thavanur
- Civic agency: Triprangode Panchayath

Triprangode is a village in Malappuram district in the state of Kerala, India. As of 2011 India census, Triprangode had a population of 41,167, with 19,174 males and 21,993 females. The village is surrounded by water bodies on three sides.

== Culture ==
Triprangode village is the site of the centuries-old Shiva Temple.

== Transportation ==
Triprangode village connects to other parts of India through Tirur town. National highway No.66 passes through Edappal and the northern stretch connects to Goa and Mumbai. The southern stretch connects to Cochin and Trivandrum. National Highway No.966 connects to Palakkad and Coimbatore. The nearest airport is at Kozhikode. The nearest major railway station is at Tirur.
