= Ponnani taluk =

Ponnani Taluk
- Taluk
- Location in Malappuram district, Kerala, India
- Coordinates: 11.152610°N 75.956678°E
- Country: India
- State: Kerala
- District: Malappuram
- Headquarters: Ponnani

Languages
  - Official: Malayalam, English
- Time zone: UTC+5:30 (IST)
- Vehicle registration: KL-54
- Website: talukofficeponnani-net.webnode.com

Ponnani Taluk is an administrative division in the Malappuram district of Kerala, India. It falls under the Tirur revenue division, with its headquarters in the town of Ponnani. Ponnani Taluk includes Ponnani Municipality and nine gram panchayats. Most administrative offices are located in the Mini-Civil Station in Ponnani.

== Overview ==
Ponnani Taluk is situated in the central part of the Kerala coast.

== History ==
Ponnani Taluk of the erstwhile Malabar District

Ponnani was the most populous taluk in the former Malabar District at the time of its dissolution. At that time, Ponnani Taluk included eight revenue blocks: Tanur, Tirur, Kuttippuram, Ponnani, Thrithala, Andathode, Chavakkad, and Nattika. On 1 November 1957, the revenue blocks of Tanur, Tirur, and Kuttippuram were separated to form Tirur Taluk, while the blocks of Chavakkad and Nattika were separated to form Chavakkad Taluk.

During the formation of Malappuram district on 16 June 1969, Ponnani Taluk was separated from Palakkad district. The Thrithala revenue block was transferred from Ponnani Taluk to Ottapalam Taluk, and three villages in the Andathode block—Punnayur, Punnayurkulam, and Vadakkekad—were transferred to Chavakkad Taluk.

Currently, Ponnani is the smallest and least populous taluk in Malappuram district. It now contains only 11 villages.

== Villages ==
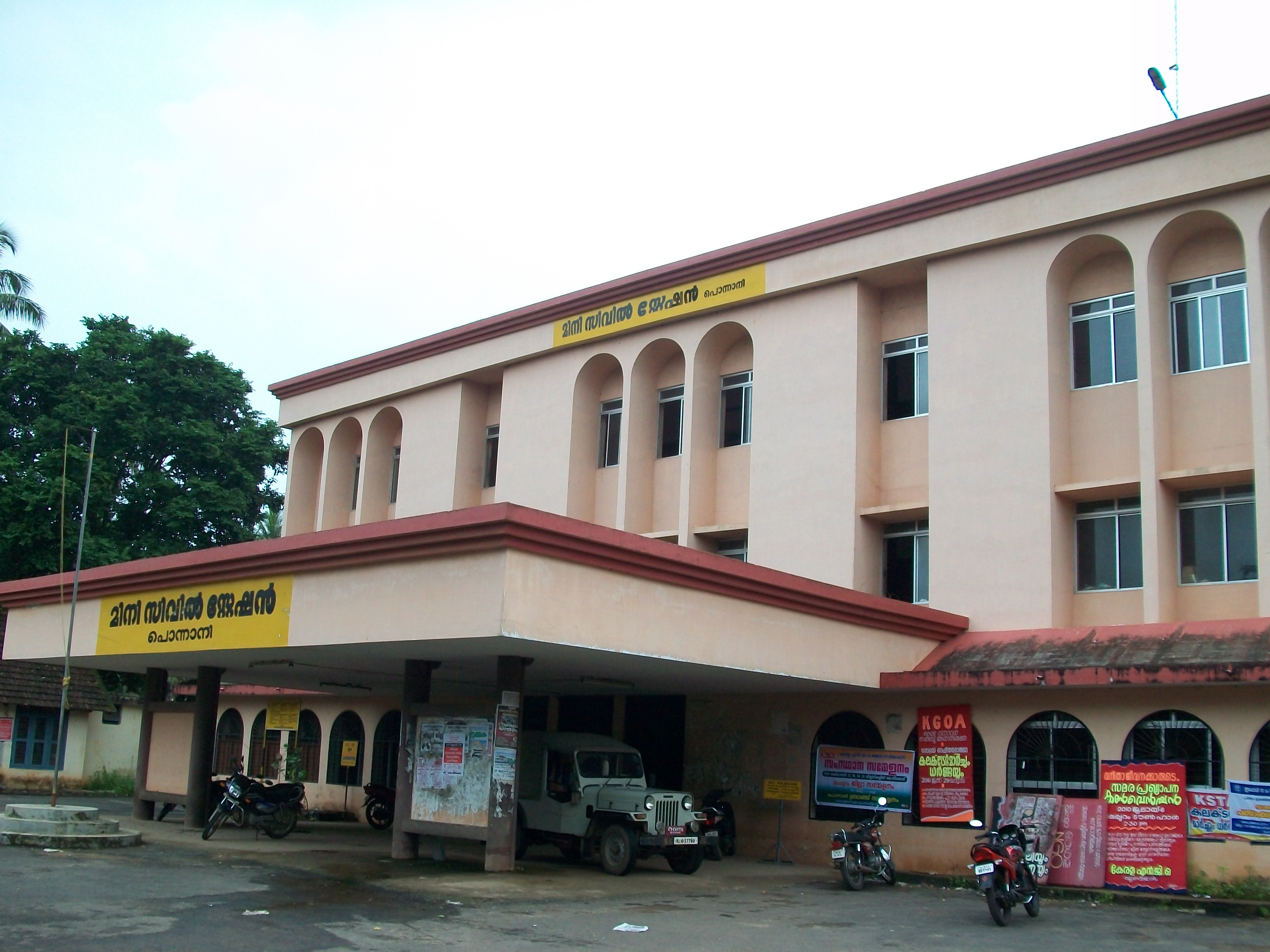
Ponnani mini civil station in 2010

The taluk comprises the following 11 villages:

1. Ponnani Nagaram
2. Veliyankode
3. Maranchery
4. Nannamukku
5. Alamcode
6. Vattamkulam
7. Edappal
8. Perumpadappa
9. Thavanur
10. Ezhuvathiruthy
11. Kalady

== Ponnani Taluk under British Rule ==
Ponnani Taluk was established in 1860–1861 by merging the former taluks of Vettathunadu (Tanur), Koottanad, and Chavakkad from the Malabar District. The Kuttippuram region of Cheranad (Tirurangadi) Taluk was also incorporated into Ponnani Taluk. The Amsoms (administrative divisions) in Ponnani Taluk were organized into five divisions: Vettathunad, Cheranad, Koottanad, Chavakkad, and the Island of Chetvai. The taluk contained a total of 73 Amsoms.

1. Vettathunad

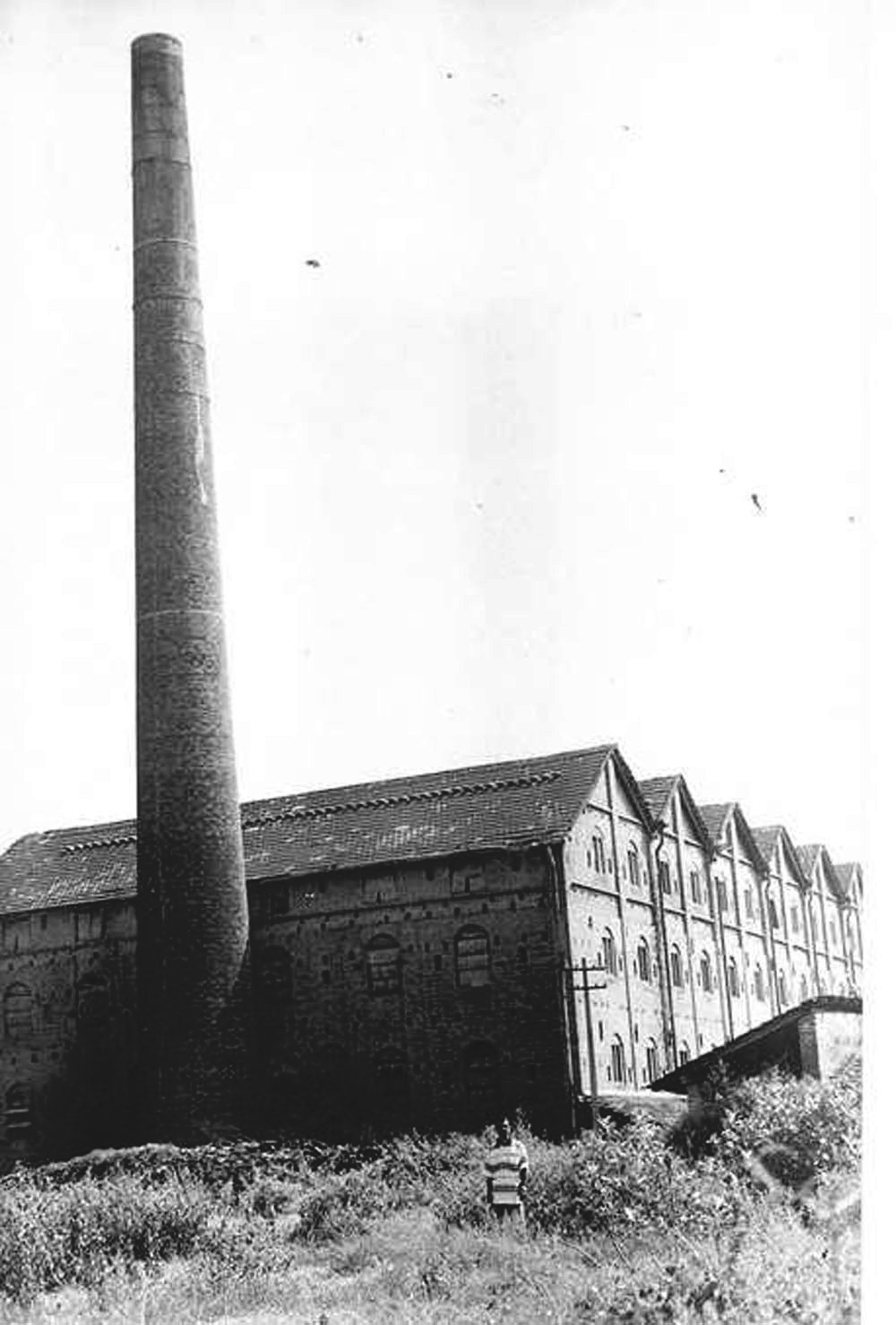
The Kodakkal Tile Factory, operated by the Commonwealth Trust at Kodakkal, Tirunavaya, was part of Ponnani Taluk at the time. Established in 1887, the Kodakkal Tile Factory is the second tile manufacturing industry in India. The first tile factory was located in Feroke, which was then part of Eranad Taluk.

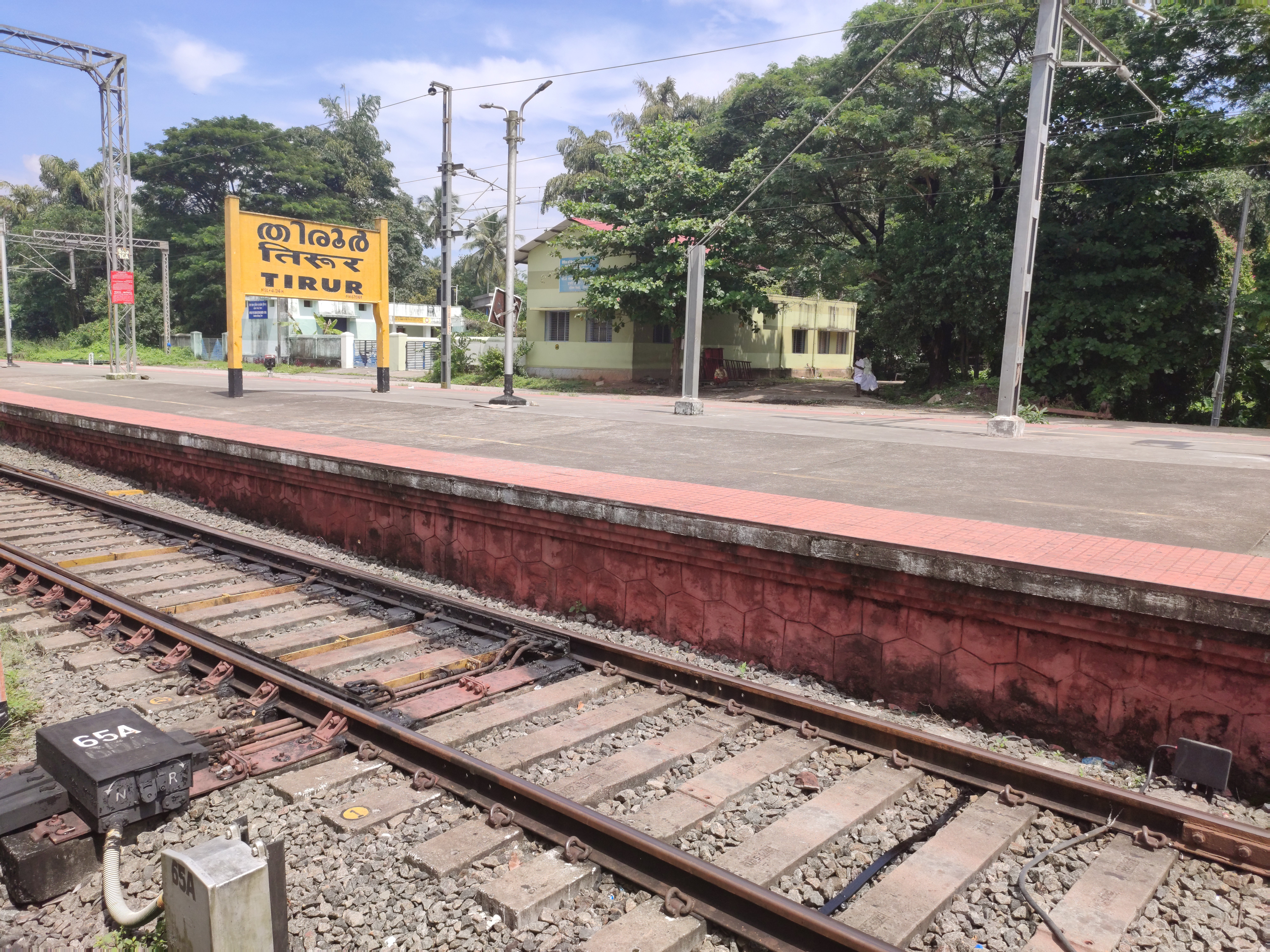
Tirur railway station, the oldest railway station of Kerala, opened in 1861.

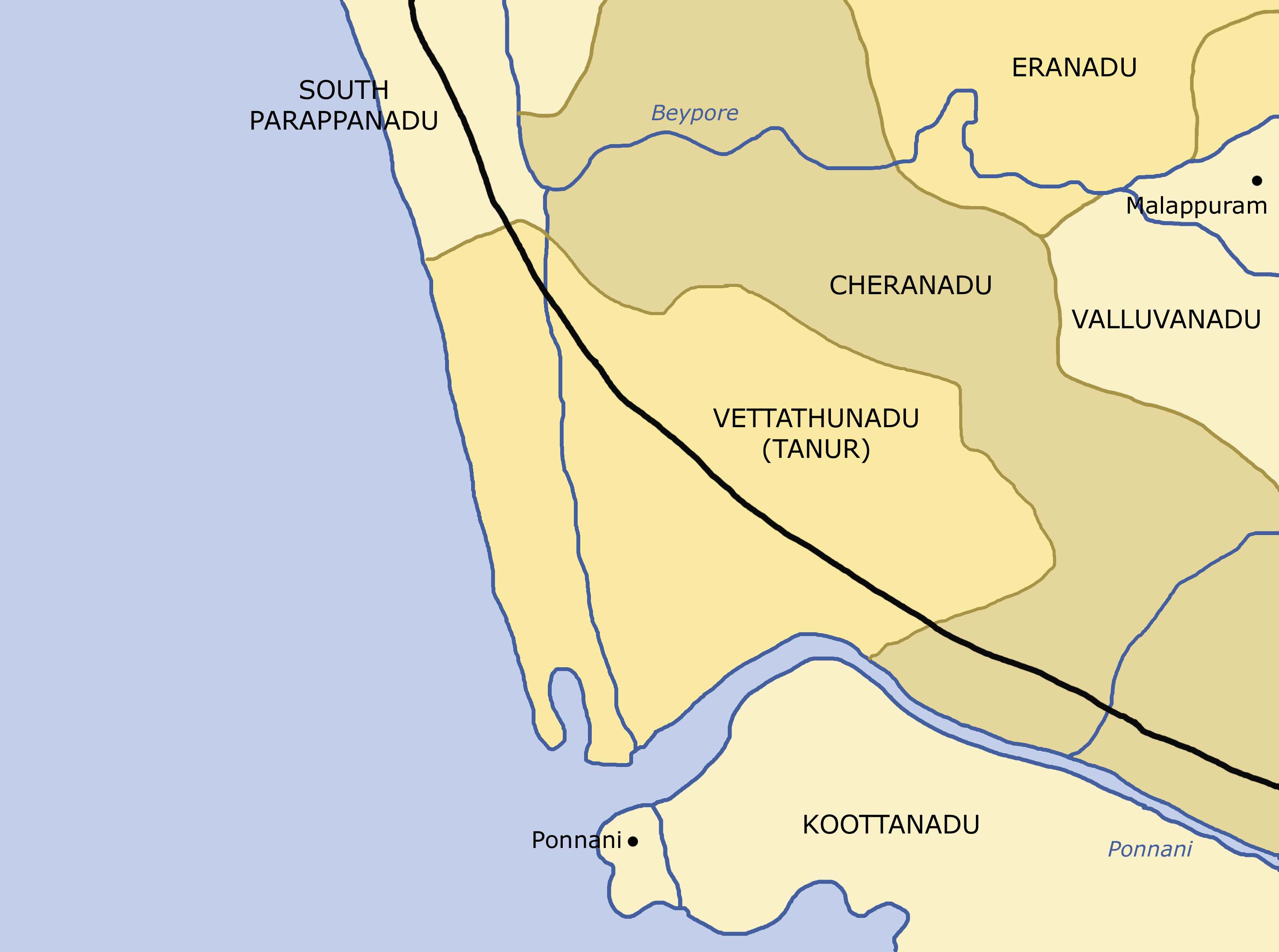
Kingdom of Tanur (Vettathunad)

Vettathunad, also known as the Kingdom of Tanur, was a coastal city-state on the Malabar Coast. It was ruled by the Vettathu Raja, who was a vassal of the Zamorin of Calicut. The Kshatriya family of the Vettathu Rajas became extinct with the death of the last Raja on 24 May 1793. Vettathunad comprised the following 21 Amsoms:

- Pariyapuram
- Rayirimangalam
- Ozhur
- Ponmundam
- Tanalur
- Niramaruthur
- Trikkandiyur
- Iringavoor
- Klari
- Kalpakanchery
- Melmuri
- Ananthavoor
- Kanmanam
- Thalakkad
- Vettom
- Pachattiri
- Mangalam
- Chennara
- Triprangode
- Pallipuram
- Purathur

2. Cheranad

The headquarters of Cheranad Taluk was the town of Tirurangadi, which was merged with Eranad Taluk during the formation of Ponnani Taluk. Cheranad was directly ruled by the Zamorin of Calicut and was divided between Eranad and Ponnani Taluks. It consisted of 17 Amsoms, 11 of which were merged with Eranad Taluk. The remaining 6 Amsoms, which were merged with Ponnani Taluk, are listed below:

- Valiyakunnu
- Kattipparuthi
- Athavanad
- Ummathoor
- Irimbiliyam
- Parudur

3. Koottanad

The second residence of the Zamorin of Calicut was Thrikkavil Kovilakam in Ponnani, located in Koottanad. The Zamorin had control over Koottanad. It comprised the following 24 Amsoms:

- Thavanur
- Kalady
- Kodanad
- Melattur
- Chekkod
- Anakkara
- Keezhmuri
- Pothanur
- Eswaramangalam
- Pallaprom
- Ponnani
- Kanjiramukku
- Edappal
- Vattamkulam
- Kumaranellur
- Kothachira
- Nagalassery
- Thirumittacode
- Othalur
- Kappur
- Alamkod
- Pallikkara
- Eramangalam
- Vayilathur

4. Chavakkad

Chavakkad was under the suzerainty of the Zamorin. It consisted of the following 14 Amsoms:

- Veliyankode
- Ayiroor
- Kadikkad
- Punnayur
- Edakkazhiyur
- Palayoor
- Guruvayur
- Iringaprom
- Annakara
- Brahmakulam
- Mullassery
- Venkitangu
- Chavakkad
- Orumanayur

5. The Island of Chetvai

The Island of Chetvai was initially under the suzerainty of the Zamorin but came under Dutch possession in 1717. It consisted of the following 7 Amsoms:

- Vadanappally
- Nattika
- Pallipuram
- Edathiruthy
- Kaipamangalam
- Pappinivattom
- Panangad

=== Ponnani Canal ===
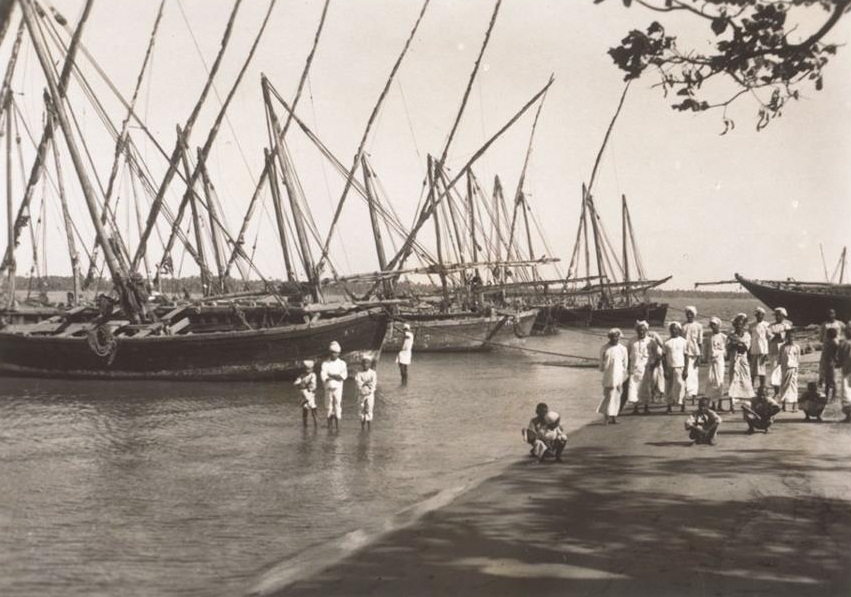
Ponnani harbour in mid-1930s

The Ponnani Canal was constructed to facilitate the transportation of goods from Ponnani to the Tirur railway station. Below is a description of the Ponnani Canal by Basel Mission employees at Codacal.

...nowadays a steamship travels between Ponani and Tirur through the Canal, where the most convenient railway station for Ponnani is to be found. The ticket costs only 4 annas, although the distance is 10 km...

== Historic maps ==
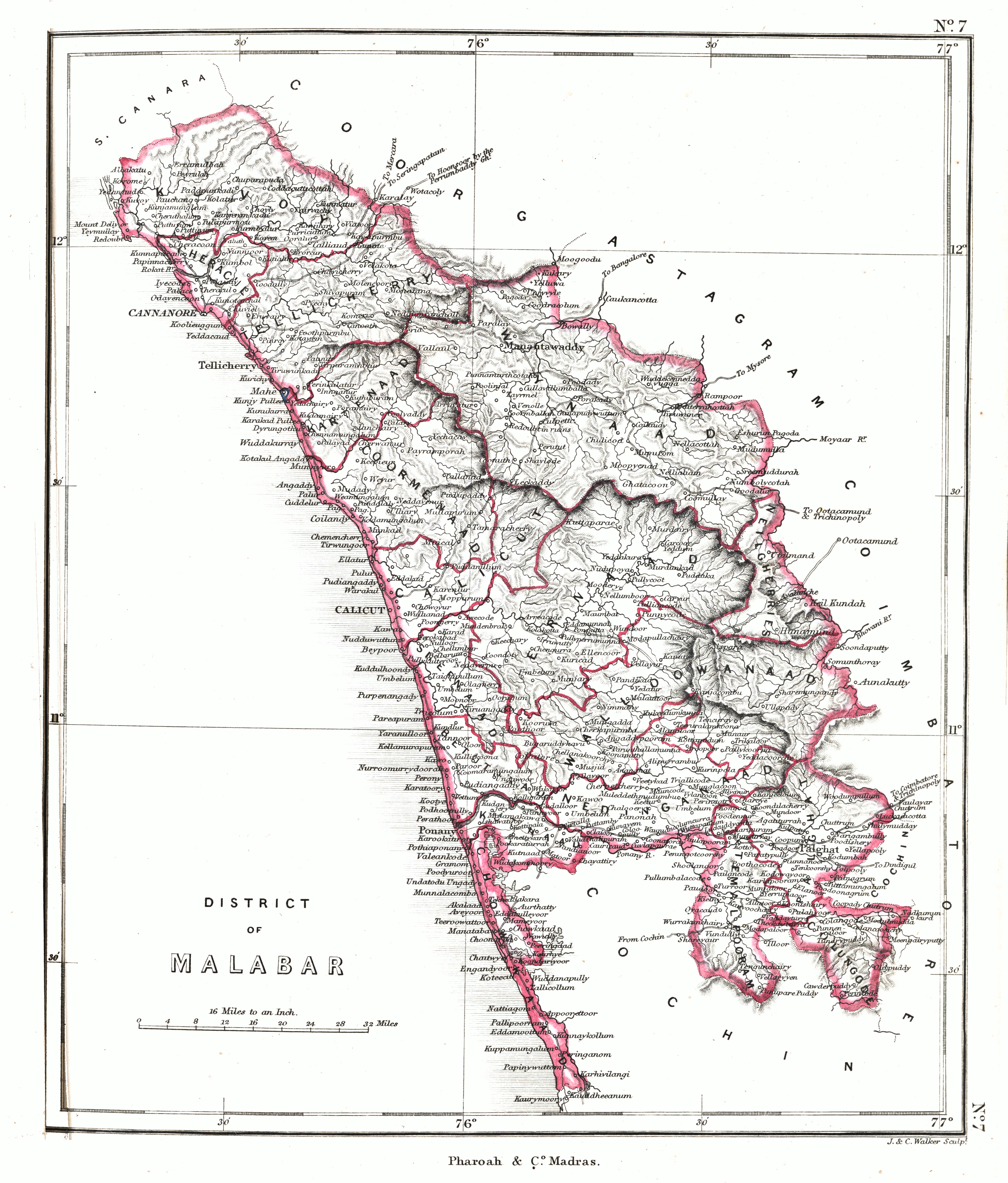
employees at Codacal.854

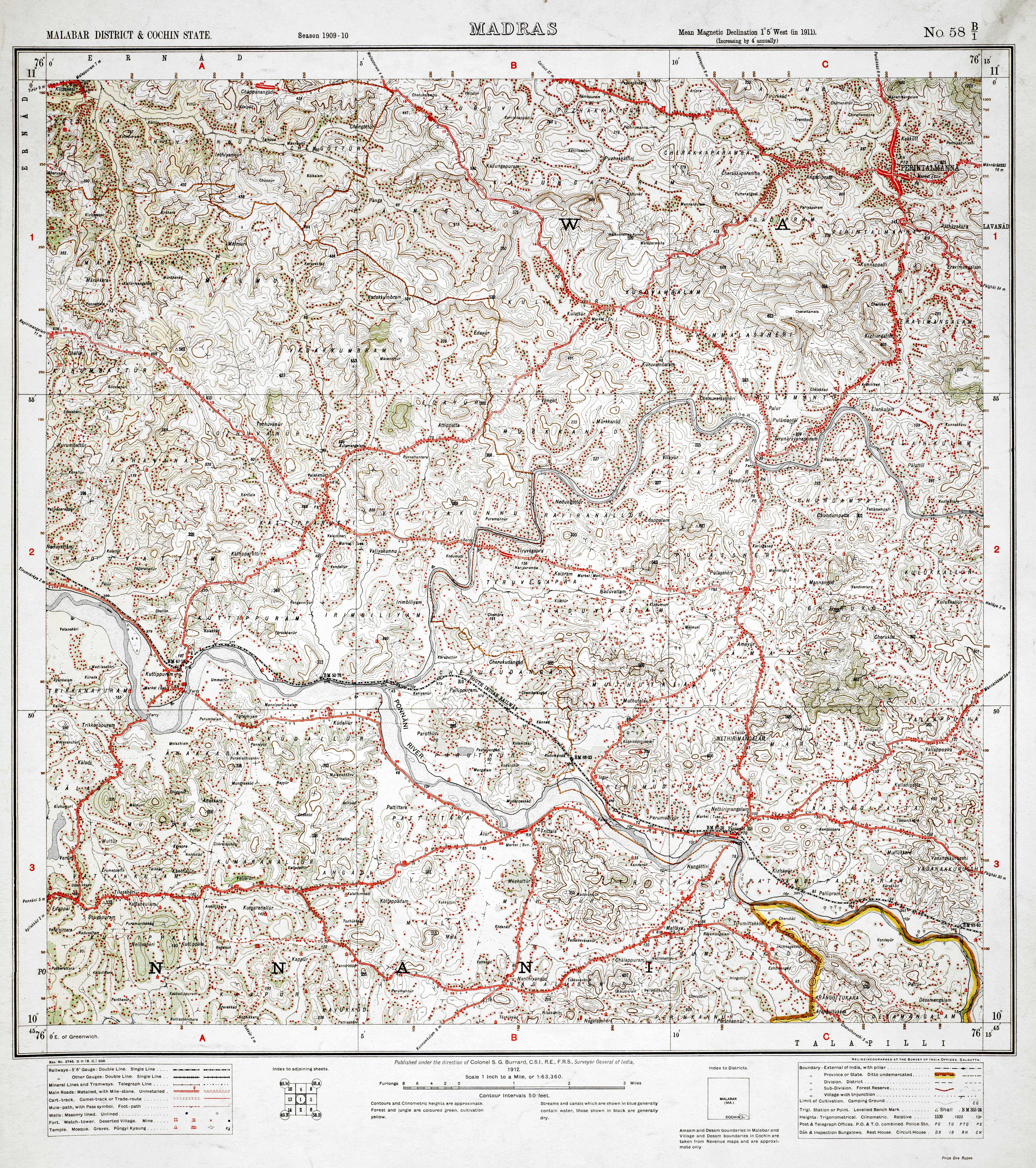
An area of Ponnani Taluk in 1912

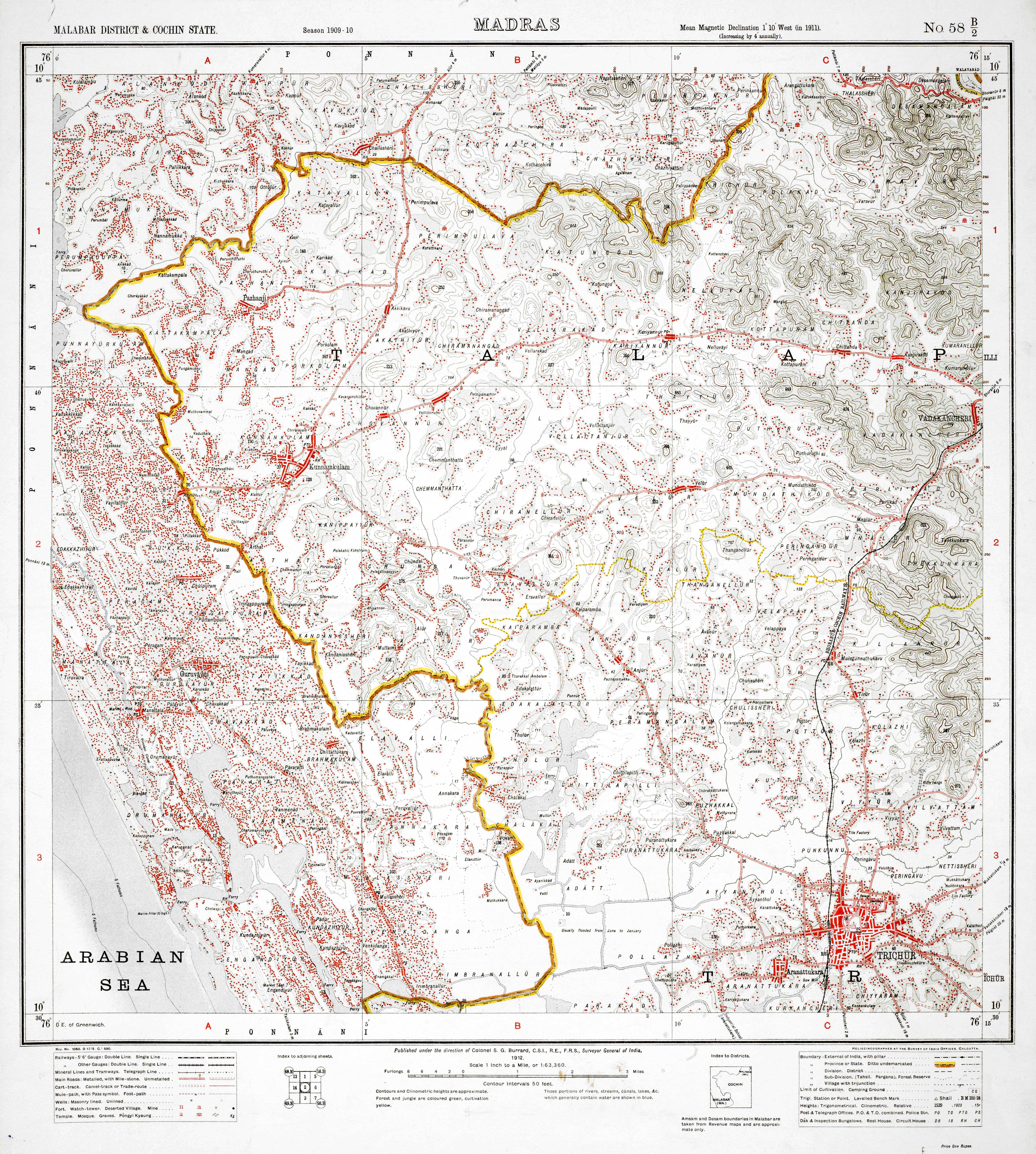
Another area of Ponnani Taluk in 1912

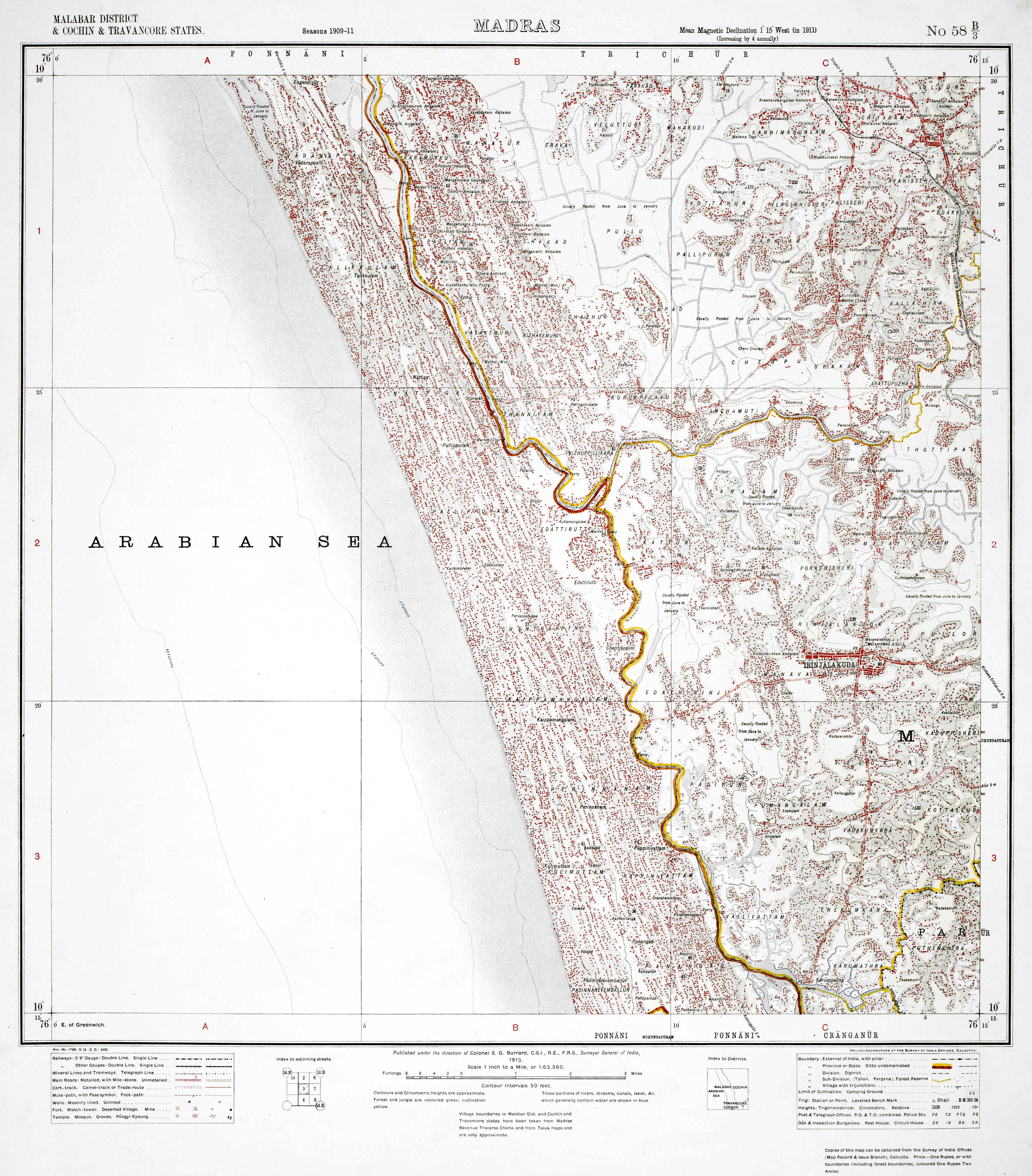
An area of Ponnani Taluk in 1913

Malabar District in 1951

== See also ==
- List of villages in Malappuram district
- List of Gram Panchayats in Malappuram district
- List of desoms in Malappuram district (1981)
- Revenue Divisions of Kerala
