= Tanur, Malappuram =

Tanur Tanore
- Municipality
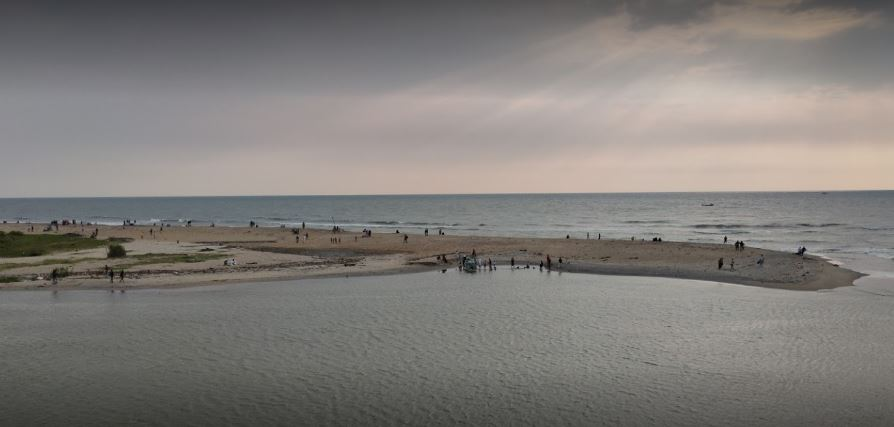
- Ottumpuram Beach, Tanur

- Location in Kerala, India Tanur (India) Tanur (Asia) Tanur (Earth)
- Coordinates: 10°58′38″N 75°52′49″E
- Country: India
- State: Kerala
- District: Malappuram

Government
  - Type: Municipality
  - Body: Tanur Municipality
  - Chairperson: Nasla Basheer (IUML)
  - Vice Chairperson: M.P Asharf (IUML)
- Elevation: 1 m (3.3 ft)

Population (2011)
  - Total: 69,870

Languages
  - Official: Malayalam, English
- Time zone: UTC+5:30 (IST)
- Postal code: 676302
- Vehicle registration: KL-10, KL-55
- Website: tanurmunicipality.lsgkerala.gov.in/en/

Tanur (English: Tanore) is a coastal town, a municipality, and a block located in Tirur Taluk, Malappuram district, Kerala, India. It is located on the Malabar Coast, 9 kilometres (5.6 mi) north of Tirur and 9 kilometres south of Parappanangadi. It is the 17th-most populated municipality in the state, the fourth-most populated municipality in the district, and the second-most densely populated municipality in Malappuram district, having about 3,568 residents per square kilometre as of the year 2011.

Tanur is located south of the estuary of Poorappuzha River, which is a tributary of Kadalundi River. Tanur was one of the major ports in the southwestern coast of India during the medieval period. It was ruled by the Kingdom of Tanur, also known as Vettathunadu, who were vassals to the Zamorin of Calicut. In the early medieval period, under the chiefs of Kozhikode and Tanur, Tanur developed as one of the important maritime trade centre on the Malabar Coast. Later it became a part of Vettathunadu Taluk in Malabar District under British Raj, which was merged with the Ponnani taluk in 1860–1861.

Tanur railway station is a part of the oldest Railway line of Kerala laid in 1861 from Tirur to Chaliyam. Presently, the status of Tanur is reduced to a major fishing centre in Kerala.

== History ==
Names, routes and locations of the Periplus of the Erythraean Sea (1st century CE)

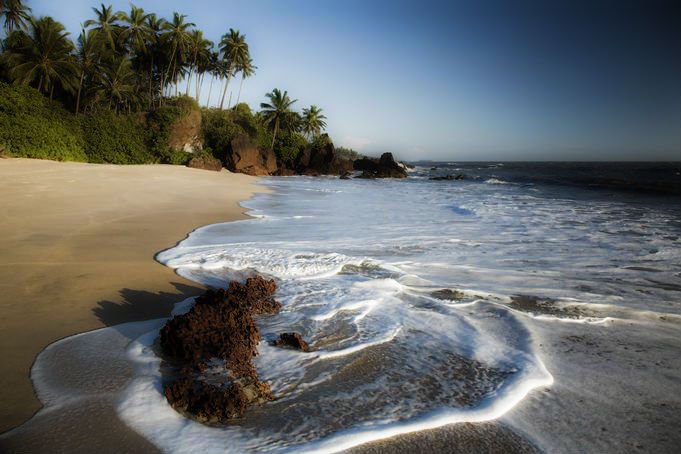
A view of Tanur beach

The ancient maritime port of Tyndis, which was then a centre of trade with Ancient Rome, is roughly identified with Tanur. Tyndis was a major center of trade, next only to Muziris, between the Cheras and the Roman Empire. Pliny the Elder (1st century CE) states that the port of Tyndis was located at the northwestern border of Keprobotos (Chera dynasty). The North Malabar region, which lies north of the port at Tyndis, was ruled by the kingdom of Ezhimala during Sangam period. According to the Periplus of the Erythraean Sea, a region known as Limyrike began at Naura and Tyndis. However, the Ptolemy mentions only Tyndis as the Limyrike's starting point. The region probably ended at Kanyakumari; it thus roughly corresponds to the present-day Malabar Coast. The value of Rome's annual trade with the region was estimated at around 50,000,000 sesterces. Pliny the Elder mentioned that Limyrike was prone by pirates. The Cosmas Indicopleustes mentioned that the Limyrike was a source of peppers.

The name "Tanur(Thanni-ur)" is derived from the Malayalam language. "Thanni" refers to the Bastard myrobalan tree, Terminalia bellirica, while "ur" refers to the settlement. Tanur was an important trading port with trade connections with Middle East during the early medieval period. When Kingdom of Tanur became vassal to the Zamorin of Calicut, Tanur also became a major port like other port towns in the kingdom. The Zamorin earned a greater part of his revenue through the maritime trade through ports.

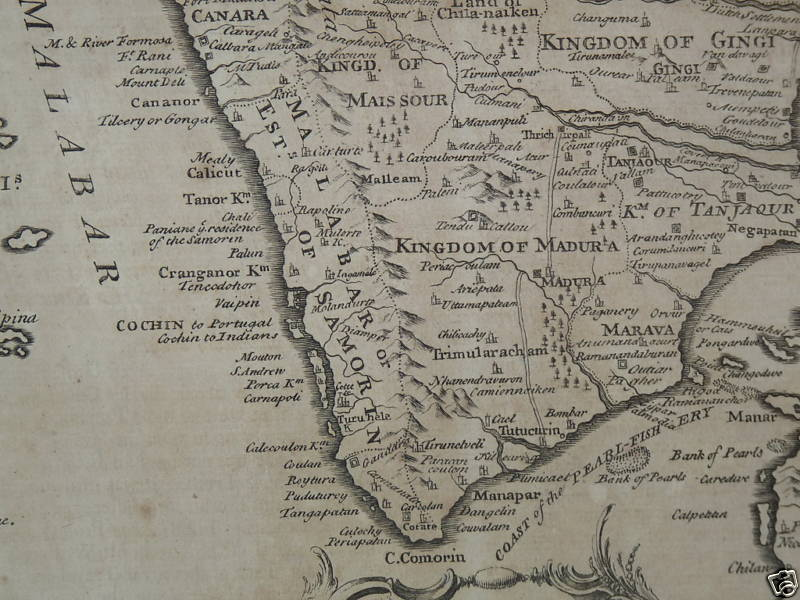
A 1744 map of Malabar Coast (Tanur is written in large letters south of Calicut. It was an important port then. Note that in the map, only Vettathunad is shown with a separate boundary within the Kingdom of Zamorin)

Vettathunad, also known as the Kingdom of Tanur, was a coastal city-state kingdom in the Malabar Coast. It was ruled by the Vettathu Raja, who was a vassal of the Zamorin of Calicut. Parts of Tirurangadi, Tirur, and Ponnani Taluks were ruled by the Vettathu Rajas. Vettathunad was known for its trade relationship with the Middle Eastern merchants in the medieval period. Tanur was a major port town in the Malabar Coast during the medieval period. Tanur was also an important trade centre. The Veṭṭathunāṭu rulers owed their allegiance to the kings (Zamorin) of Calicut, a regional power on the Malabar coast. With the emergence of the Portuguese in India, the Veṭṭathunāṭu ruler sided with them against his overlord at Calicut. It is believed that St. Francis Xavier visited Tanur in 1546 AD. The Raja converted to Christianity — though only for a few months — in 1549.

It is also known that during the Battle at Chaliyam Fort in 1571 carried out by the naval force of Zamorin with the support of native Mappilas, which ousted the Portuguese from the region of Zamorin of Calicut, Chaliyam was the northern border of Kingdom of Tanur. Its southern border was somewhere near Thavanur on the bank of Bharathappuzha river. Vettathunadu had sea coast and four major rivers (Chaliyar, Kadalundi River, Tirur River, and Bharathappuzha river). The rulers of Tanur were great admirers of art and culture. Thunchaththu Ezhuthachan, the father of modern Malayalam language, and many of the members of the medieval Kerala School of Astronomy and Mathematics were natives of Tirur in Vettathunadu. Melpathur Narayana Bhattathiri, another prominent figure of 16th century Kerala, was also born at Kurumbathur near Athavanad.

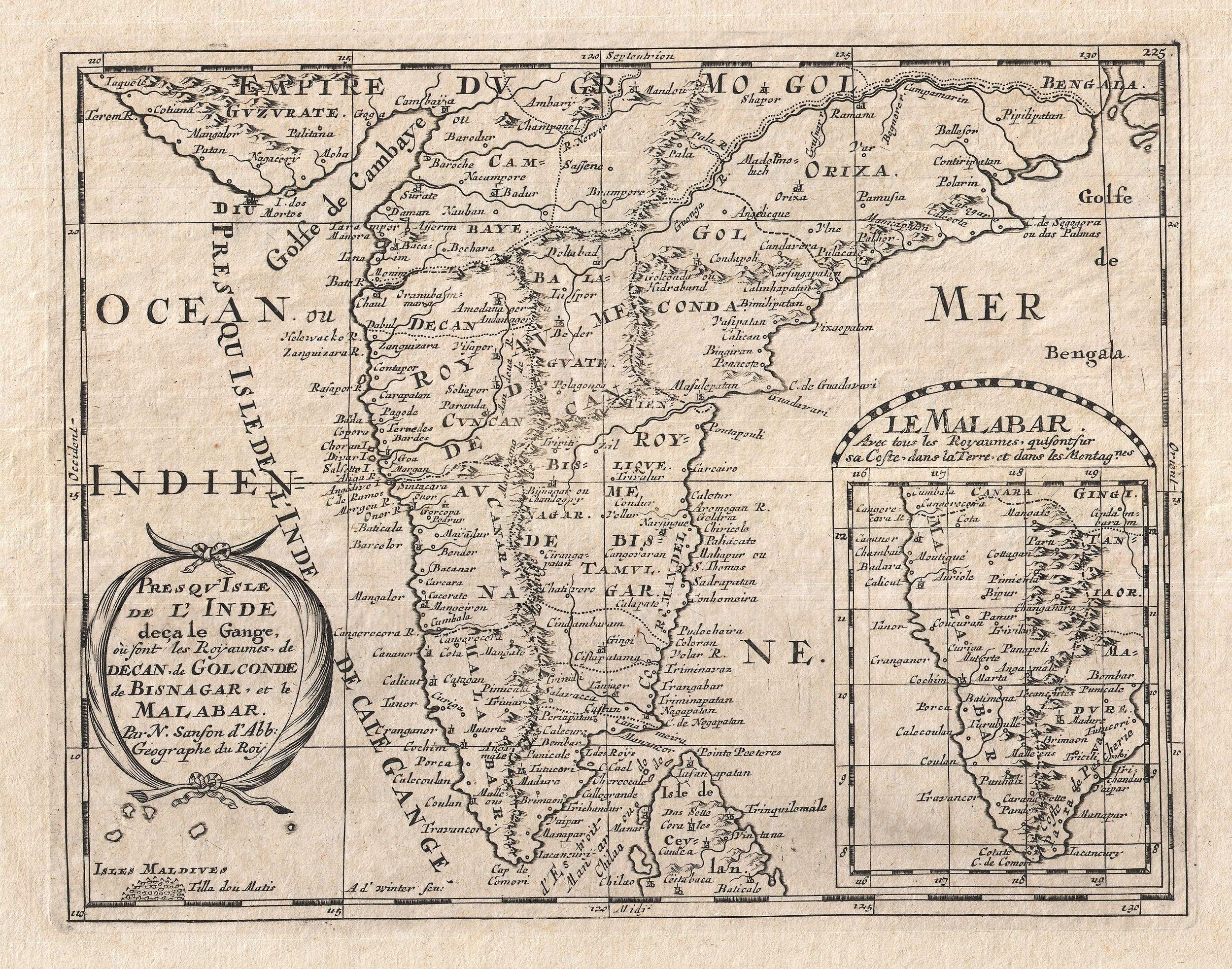
A 1652 map of India (Tanur was a major port town on Malabar Coast)

In the 16th century, Portuguese arrived here just after the arrival of Vasco Da Gama near Calicut. Kingdom of Tanur was one of the earliest Portuguese colonies in the Indian Subcontinent. The ruler of the Kingdom of Tanur, who was a vassal to the Zamorin of Calicut, sided with the Portuguese, against his overlord at Kozhikode. As a result, the Kingdom of Tanur (Vettathunadu) became one of the earliest Portuguese Colonies in India. The ruler of Tanur also sided with Cochin. Many of the members of the royal family of Cochin in 16th and 17th members were selected from Vettom. However, the Tanur forces under the king fought for the Zamorin of Calicut in the Battle of Cochin (1504). However, the allegiance of the Mappila merchants in Tanur region still stayed under the Zamorin of Calicut. Thunchaththu Ezhuthachan, who is considered as the father of modern Malayalam literature, was born at Tirur (Vettathunadu) during Portuguese period. The Kerala school of astronomy and mathematics flourished between the 14th and 16th centuries. In attempting to solve astronomical problems, the Kerala school independently created a number of important mathematics concepts, including series expansion for trigonometric functions. The Kerala school was mainly based at Kingdom of Tanur.

The naval chiefs of Zamorin, commonly known as Kunjali Marakkars, had close relationship with the medieval port town of Tanur. In 1523, when the Portuguese Viceroy Menezes sailed with all the available ships to Hormuz, an Arab merchant, one Kutti Ali of Tanur, had the effrontery to bring a fleet of two hundred vessels to Calicut, to load eight ships with pepper, and to despatch them with a convoy of forty vessels to the Red Sea before the very eyes of the Portuguese. In 1532 with the help of the ruler of Tanur, a chapel was built at Chaliyam, together with a house for the commander, barracks for the soldiers, and store-houses for trade. Diego de Pereira, who had negotiated the treaty with the Zamorin, was left in command of this new fortress, with a garrison of 250 men; and Manuel de Sousa had orders to secure its safety by sea, with a squadron of twenty-two vessels. The Zamorin soon repented of having allowed this fort to be built in his dominions, and used ineffectual endeavours to induce the ruler of Parappanangadi, Caramanlii (King of Beypore?) (Some records say that the ruler of Tanur was also with them) to break with the Portuguese, even going to war against them. In 1571, the Portuguese were defeated by the Zamorin forces in the battle at Chaliyam Fort.

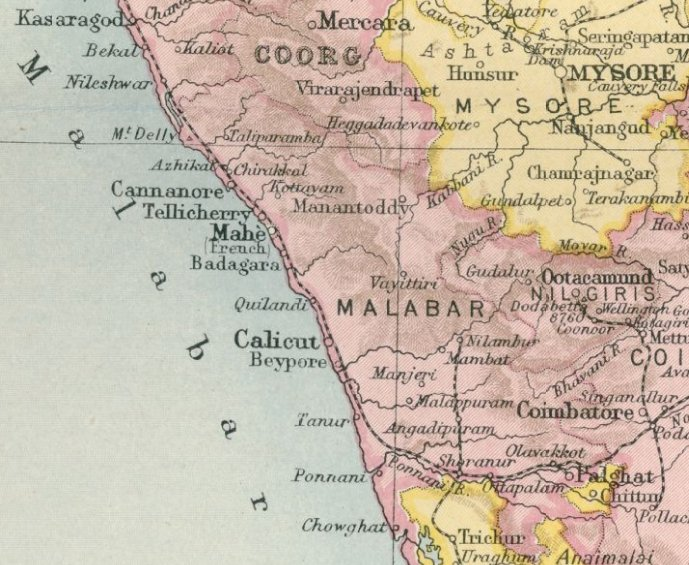
Important towns in erstwhile British Malabar

During the last decades of 18th century CE, Vettathunadu became a part of Kingdom of Mysore. Tanur is located on Tirur-Kadalundi Tipu Sultan Road. It is one of the earliest roads in Kerala, which was created by Tipu for his conquests. Following the Treaty of Seringapatam in 1792, Tanur became a part of British India. During the arrival of British, according to William Logan, the kingdom ("nadu") was divided into 21 "Amsoms" as shown below (A main bazaar in each Amsom is given in bracket):

Anantavur (Cherulal), Chennara, Clari (Kuttippala), Iringavur, Kalpakanchēri (Kadungathukundu), Kanmanam (Thuvvakkad), Mangalam, Mēlmuri, Niramaruthūr, Ozhūr, Pachattiri, Pallippuram, Pariyāpuram, Ponmundam (Vailathoor), Purathur, Rayiramangalam, Thalakkad (Betteth Puthiya Angadi), Thanalur, Trikkandiyoor (Tirur), Triprangode, and Vettom.

According to Logan, the Kshatriya family of the Vettathu Rajas became extinct with the death of the last Raja on 24 May 1793. It was an important town in Malabar District during the British rule. During the first decades of British era Vettathunadu was the name of a Taluk in Malabar District consisting of Tanur and Tirur regions of present-day Tirur Taluk, and it was situated on the northern bank of the River Bharathappuzha. Later it was merged with Ponnani taluk. Tanur railway station is one of the oldest railway stations in Kerala. It was a part of the first rail route (Tirur–Chaliyam) in Kerala, which began in the year 1861. In 1957, the region was separated from Ponnani taluk to form Tirur Taluk.

== Civic administration ==
The town is administered by Tanur Municipality, headed by a chairperson. For administrative purposes, the town is divided into 44 wards, from which the members of the municipal council are elected for a term of five years.

Tanur Municipality

=== Tanur Municipality election 2020 ===
S.No.	Party name	Party symbol	Number of Councillors
01	UDF		32
02	BJP		07
03	Independents		07

=== Law and order ===
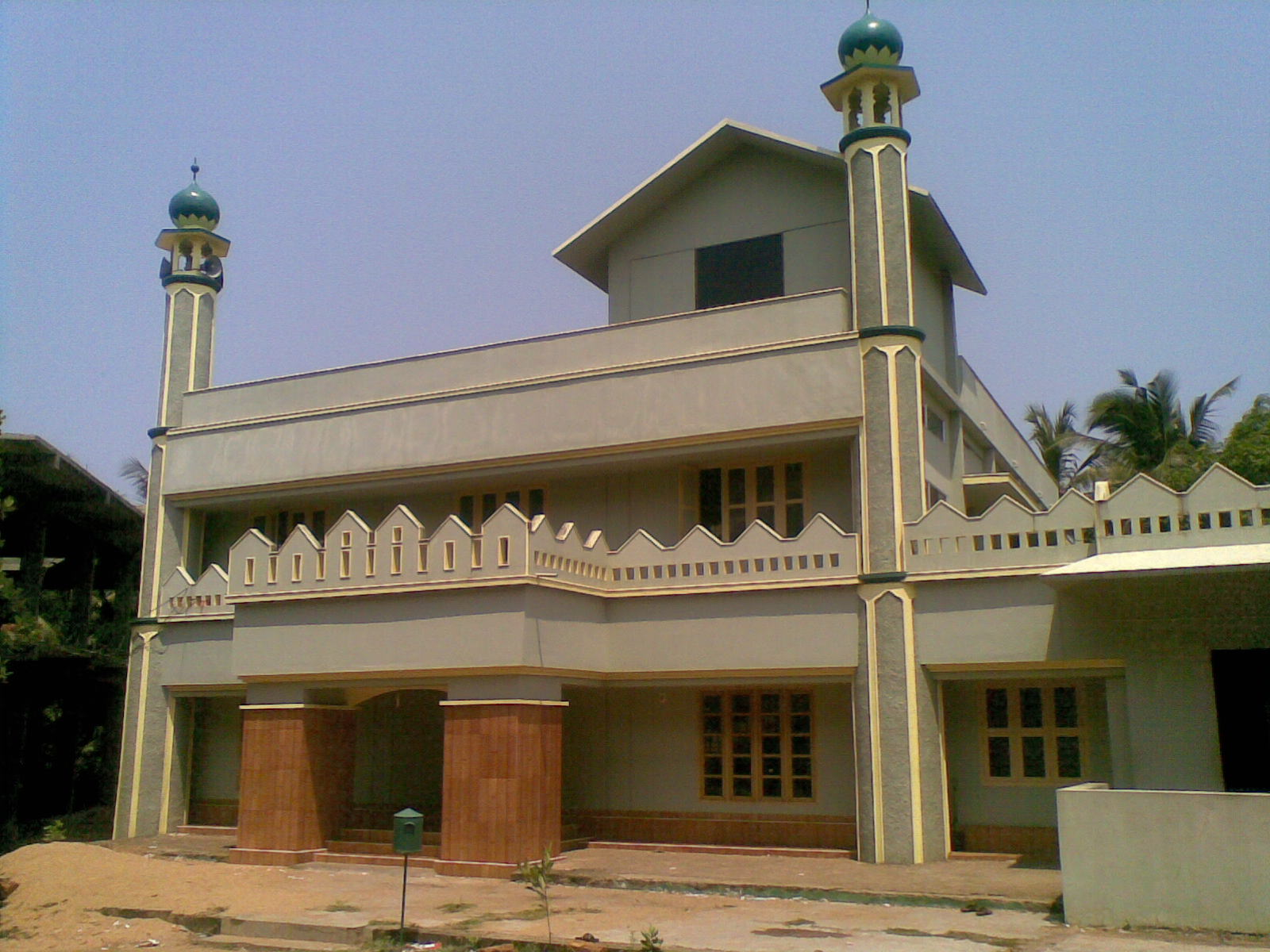
Badr Juma Masjid, Edakkadappuram, Tanur

The municipality comes under the jurisdiction of the Tanur police station, which was formed on 29 February 1962. The station is located on Tanur-Parappanangadi public road about 100 yards west of Tanur junction. The station has the jurisdiction over the municipality of Tanur and the Gram panchayats of Tanalur, Ozhur, Niramaruthur, and Nannambra.

The jurisdictional courts of Tanur Police Station are Judicial First Class Magistrate Court at Parappanangadi, Subdivisional Magistrate Court at Tirur, and Sessions Court at Manjeri.

The border police stations are headquartered at Tirur, Parappanangadi, Kalpakanchery, and Tirurangadi.

Tanur is also headquarters of one among the six subdivisions of Malappuram District Police. The police stations at Tanur, Parappanangadi, Tirurangadi, Kalpakanchery, and Kadampuzha comes under the jurisdiction of Tanur subdivisional zone of district police.

== Transport ==
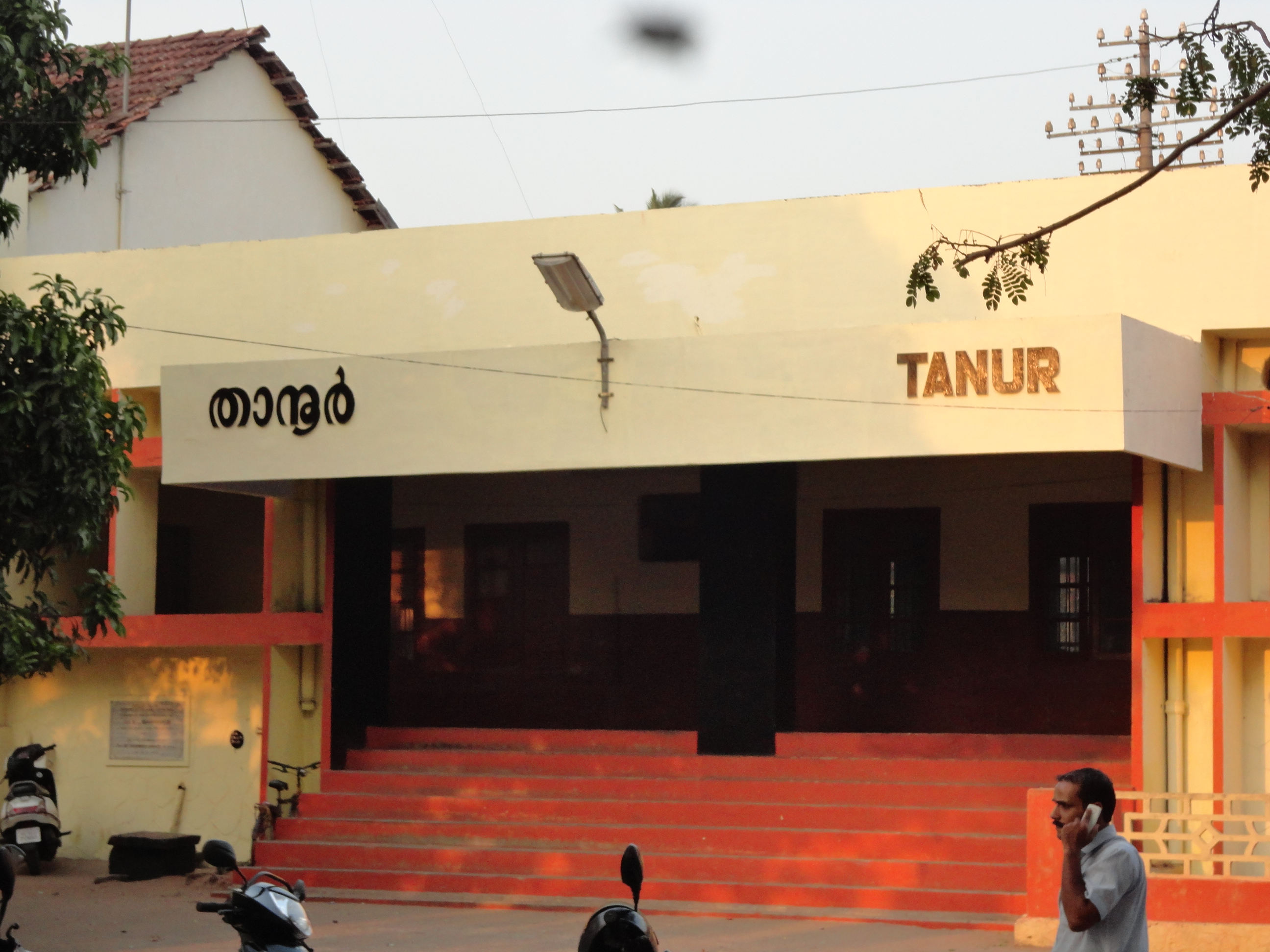
Tanur Railway Station

Tanur railway station, in the heart of the town, is located 30 kilometres (19 mi) from Malappuram on the Shoranur - Mangalore Section of the Southern Railway. The nearest airport is Karipur Airport, which is approximately 30 kilometres (19 mi) from the town. Tipu Sultan Road (Tirur-Kadalundi Road), one among the oldest roads of Kerala (laid in 18th century CE), passes through Tanur town.

== Geography ==
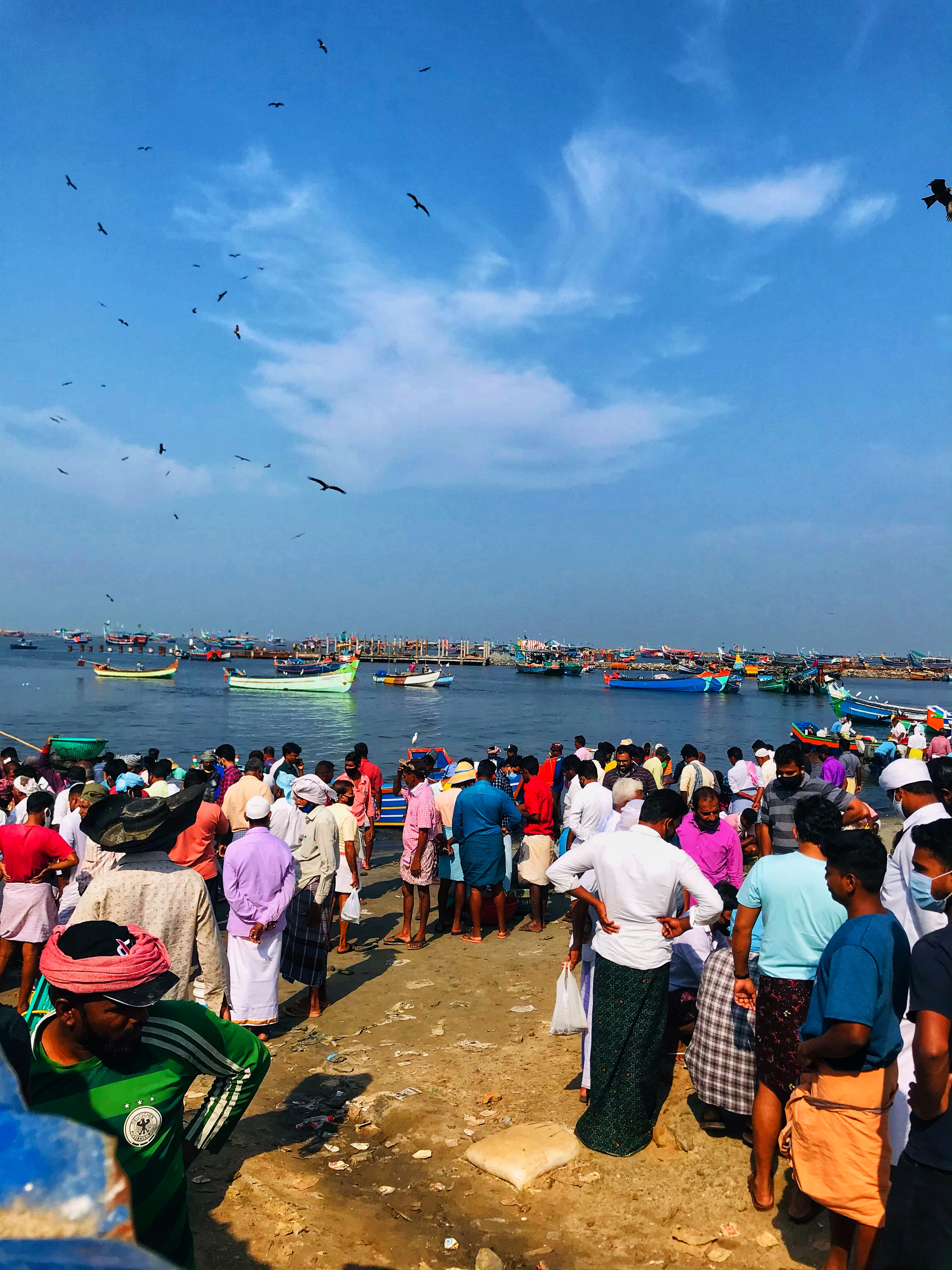
Tanur fishing harbour

Tanur is located on the coast. It has an average elevation of 1 m (3 ft).

== Places of interest ==
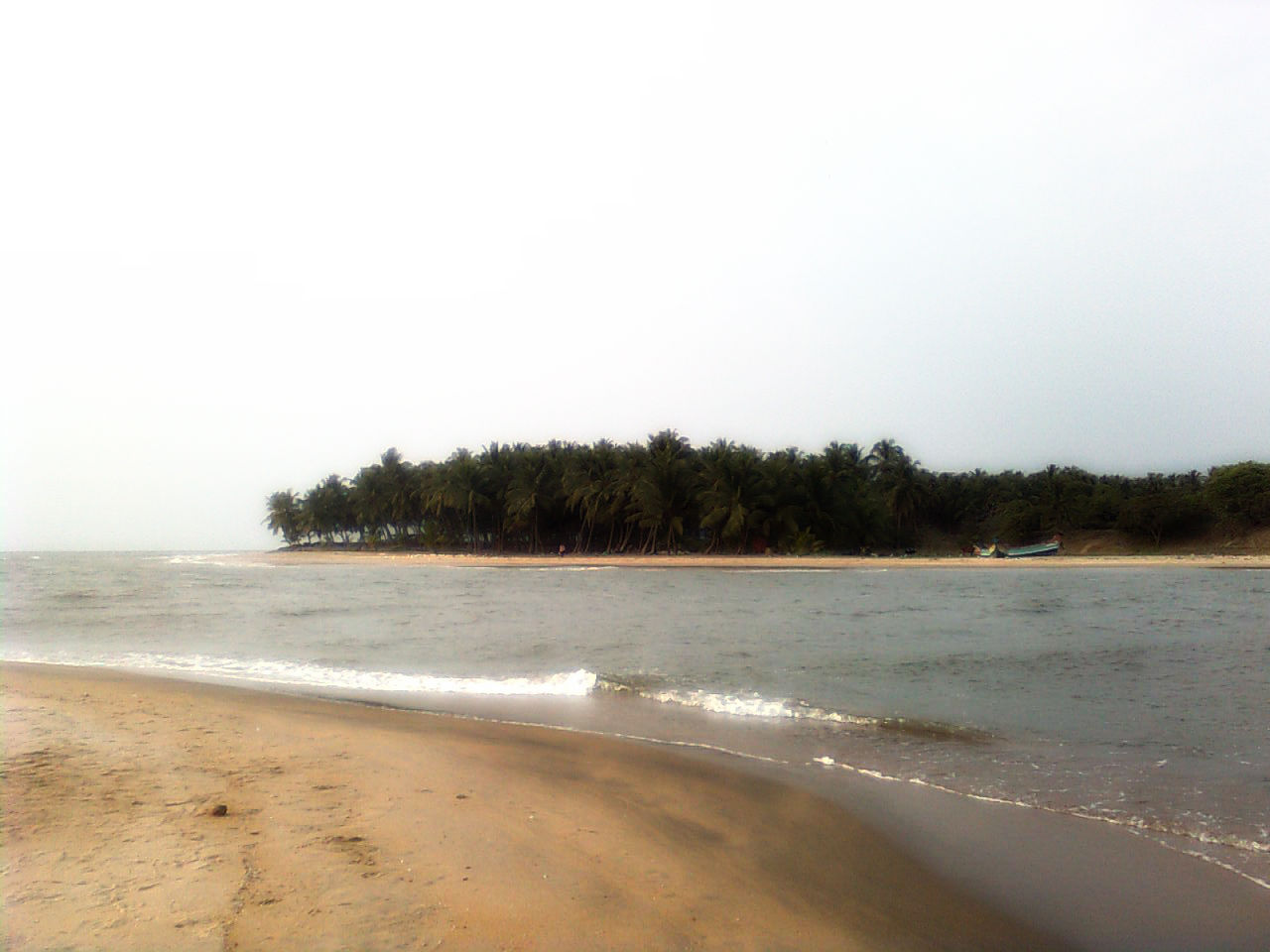
Tanur beach

- Tanur Beach
- Tanur harbour
- Purappuzha estuary (Purappuzha Azhimukham)
- Kodinhi backwater (Kodinhi Kayal)

== Education ==
Govt Arts and Science College Tanur: C.H. Muhammad Koya Memorial Govt. Arts & Science College Tanur was established in 2013. The college is affiliated to the University of Calicut. Now the college is temporarily located at Puthentheru, about 3 km away from Tanur town. College offers UG courses in B.A English, B.COM, BBA, BCA, and B.Sc. Electronics as well as a PG course in Integrated MA [Malayalam] (IPMA). The college has been an entrance to the world of higher education for the public, especially for the people from coastal area.

Islahul Uloom Arabic College: Islahul Uloom Arabic College in Tanur town is one among the oldest Arabic Colleges in Kerala. It was built in 1924 under the leadership of Pangil Ahmed Kutty Musliyar, a personality who died in 1946. The decision to building an Islamic Institution in Tanur was made by Asasul Islam Sabha of Tanur, in a meeting held at Tanur Valiya Kulangara Palli, on 24 October 1924.

Devadhar Government Higher Secondary School: Established in 1919, it is one of the oldest secondary schools in Kerala.

There are also many private and government schools as well as a state Industrial training institute and a government arts and science college. Another important school near Tanur is Govt. Higher Secondary School, Kattilangadi, Tanur. A Govt. Fisheries Vocational Higher Secondary school is also there.

== Wards of Tanur ==
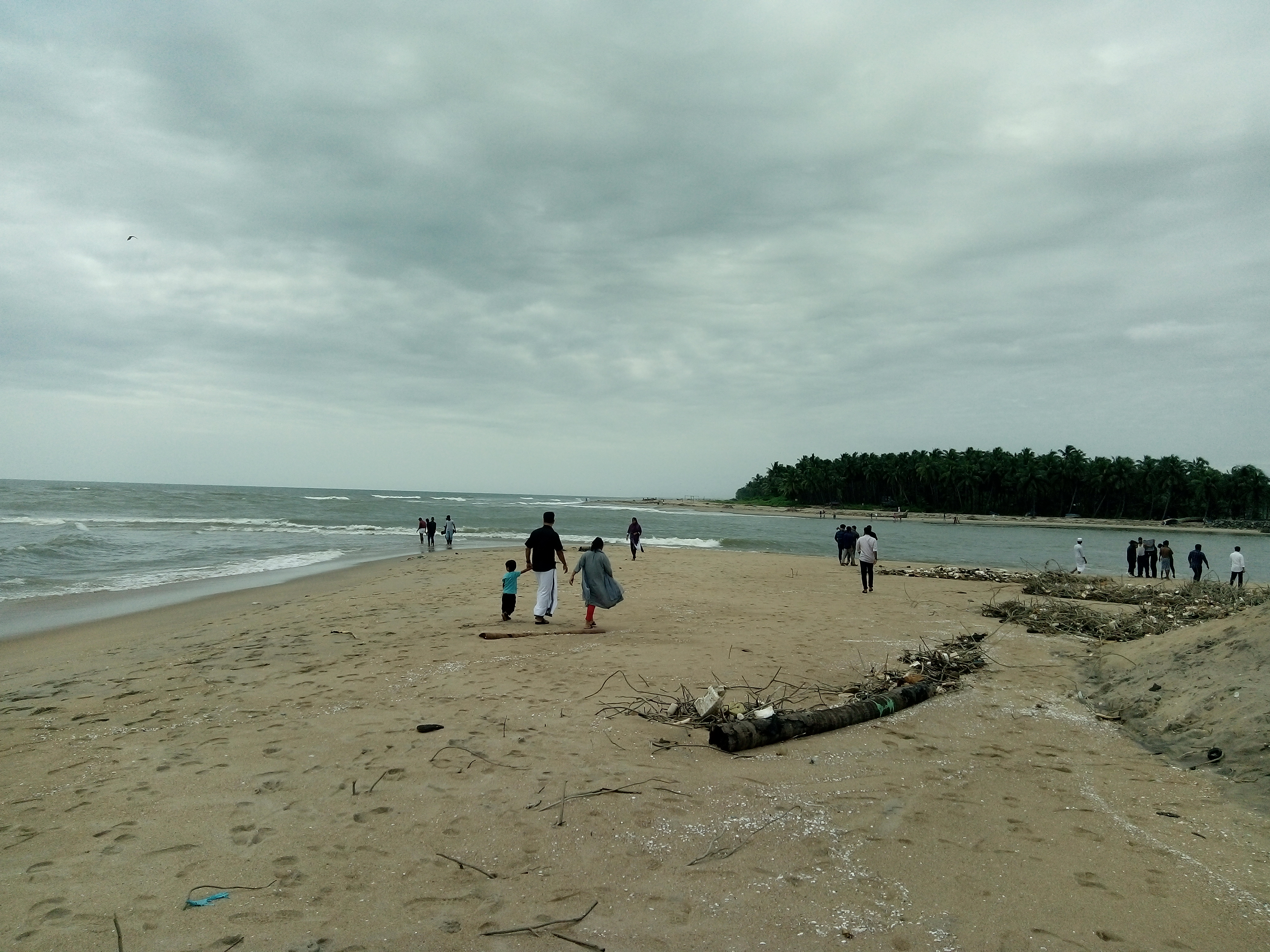
Poorappuzha Azhimukham beach, Pariyapuram, Tanur

Tanur Municipality is composed of the following 44 wards:

Ward no.	Name	Ward no.	Name
1	Ottumpuram	2	Pariyapuram
3	Olappeedika	4	Malidhweep
5	Attillam	6	Kunnumpuram North
7	Morya	8	Kunnumpuram South
9	Kunnumpuram Central	10	Kunnumpuram East
11	Panangatoor Central	12	Panangatoor
13	Chanchery Parambu	14	Rayirimangalam East
15	Rayirimangalam West	16	Theyyala Railway Gate
17	Kannanthali	18	Kattilangadi
19	Kattilangadi South	20	Kattilangadi West
21	Nadakkavu	22	Tanur
23	Karadu	24	Puthiya Kadappuram
25	Anjudi	26	Cheeran Kadappuram
27	Vembalan Parambu	28	Edakkadappuram South
29	Edakkadappuram North	30	Tanur Nagaram
31	Harbour	32	Elaram Kadappuram
33	Tanur Central	34	Civil Station
35	Chellikadu	36	CHC
37	Pandarakkadappuram	38	Chappappadi
39	Albasar	40	Kormman Kadappuram North
41	Chirakkal	42	Chirakkal North
43	Mukkola	44	Companypady

== Suburbs of Tanur ==
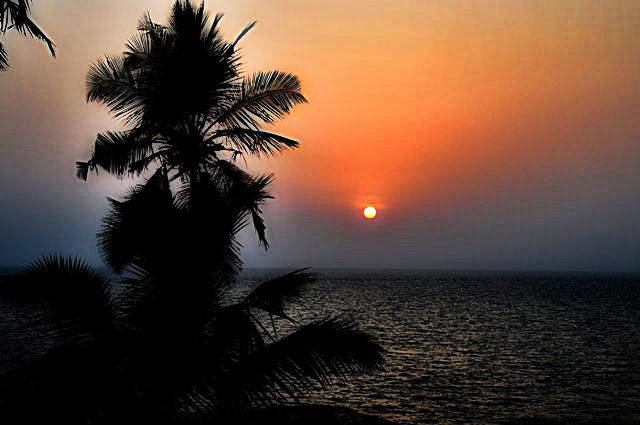
A sunset at Tanur beach

On Kadalundy Route

- Chiramangalam, Mukkola and Moolakkal
- Devadhar, Puthentheru and Vattathani
- Valiyapadam, Moochikkal and Cherumoochikkal
- Peruvazhiyambalam, Pookkayil and Naduvilangadi

== Tanur Block ==
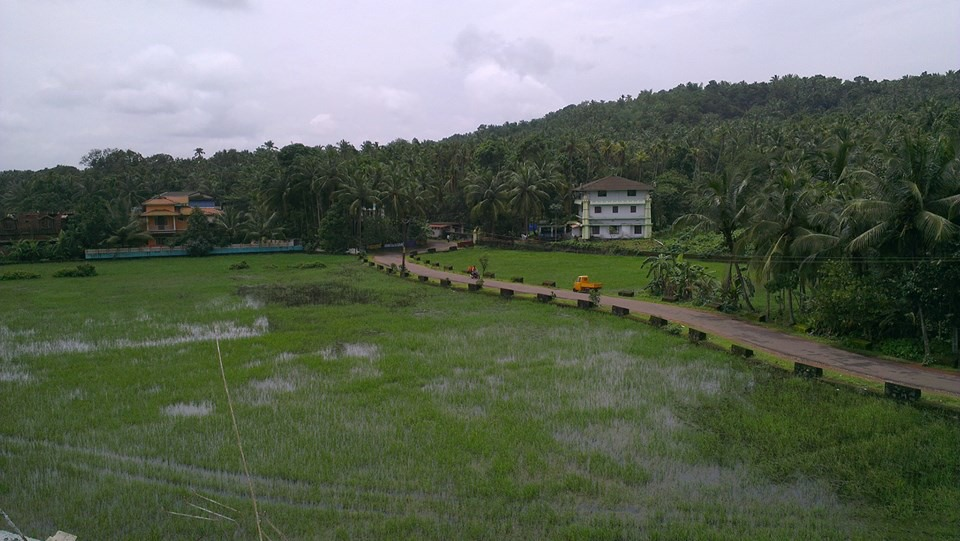
A countryside near Tanur (at Manalippuzha)

Tanur Block Panchayat is the local body responsible for the block-level administration of the following Gram panchayats:

- Cheriyamundam
- Niramaruthur
- Ozhur
- Perumanna-Klari
- Ponmundam
- Tanalur
- Valavannur

== See also ==
- Tanur (State Assembly constituency)
- Tanur railway station
- Kingdom of Tanur
- Tirur Taluk
