= Ponnani (disambiguation) =

Ponnani is a city in Kerala, India. It may also refer to:

- Ponnani Taluk, a Taluka in Kerala
- Ponnani (State Assembly constituency), a constituency in Kerala.
- Ponnani (Lok Sabha constituency), a Lok sabha constituency in Kerala.
