= Vettom Gram Panchayat =

Village in Kerala, India

Vettom
- village
- Location in Kerala, India Vettom (India)
- Coordinates: 10°52′0″N 75°54′0″E
- Country: India
- State: Kerala
- District: Malappuram

Area
  - Total: 10 km^{2} (3.9 sq mi)

Population (2011)
  - Total: 37,456
  - Density: 3,700/km^{2} (9,700/sq mi)

Languages
  - Official: Malayalam, English
- Time zone: UTC+5:30 (IST)
- PIN: 6XXXXX
- Telephone code: 0494
- Vehicle registration: KL-10, KL-55
- Nearest city: Tirur
- Literacy: 94%
- Lok Sabha constituency: Ponnani
- Vidhan Sabha constituency: Tirur
- Climate: mixed climate (Köppen)

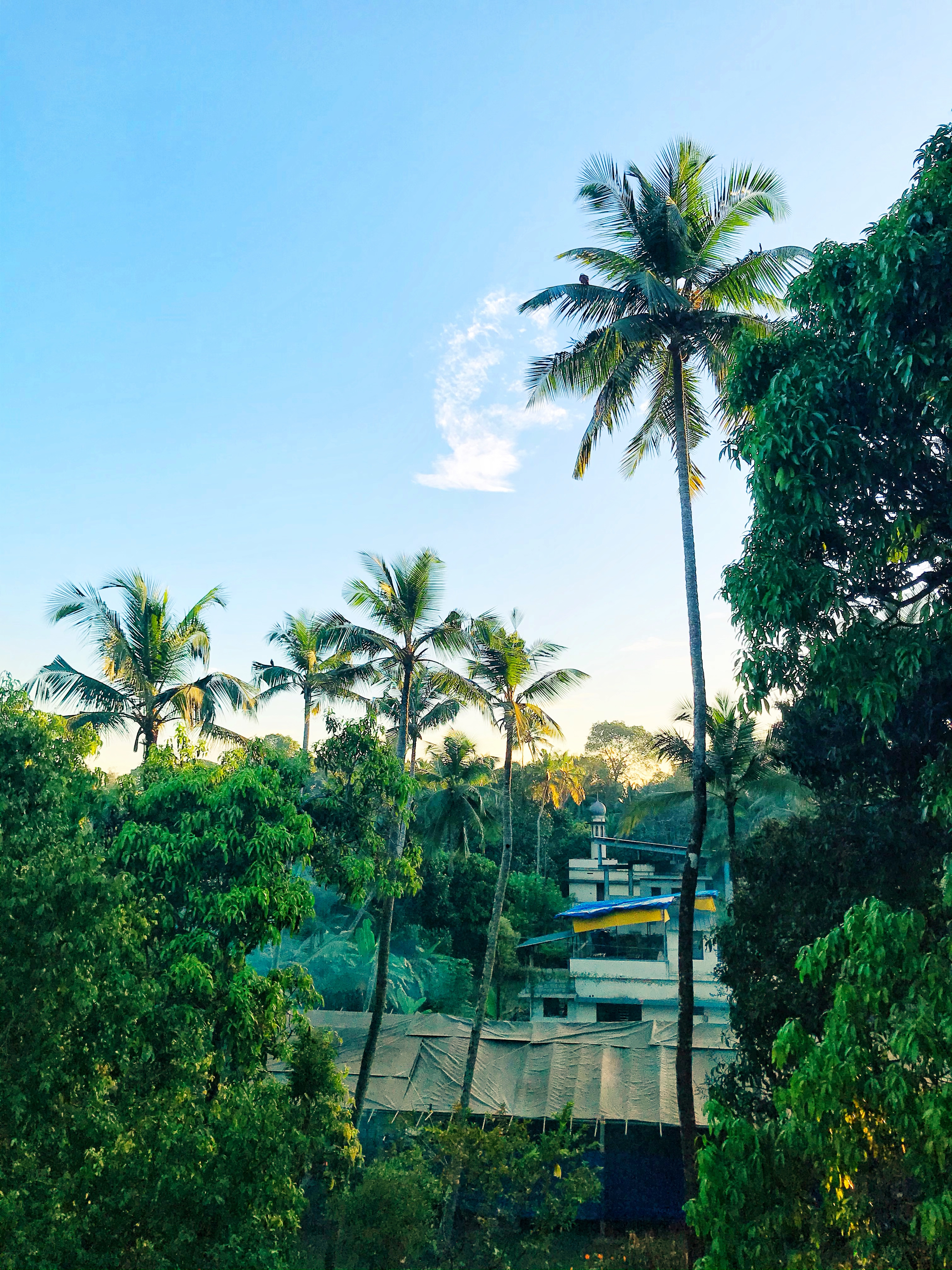
land of light- Vettom, Tirur, Malapppuram

Vettom is a local body of the Kerala government and village in Tirur Taluk, Malappuram district, India. It is a coastal suburb of Tirur Municipality and was part of the Kingdom of Tanur (Vettathnad) in medieval times. The Vettom Gram Panchayat is surrounded by the Tirur River and the Canoli Canal.

== Demographics ==
As of the 2011 India census, Vettom had a population of 37,456 with 17,401 males and 20,055 females.

== Transportation ==
Vettom village connects to other parts of India through Tirur town. National highway No.66 passes through Tirur and the northern stretch connects to Goa and Mumbai. The southern stretch connects to Cochin and Trivandrum. Highway No.966 goes to Palakkad and Coimbatore. The nearest airport is at Kozhikode. The nearest major railway station is at Tirur.

== Wards of Vettom ==
Vettom Grama Panchayat

Vettom Grama Panchayat is composed of the following 20 wards:

Ward no.	Name	Ward no.	Name
1	Thevarkadapuram	2	Paravanna East
3	Murivazhikkal	4	Pachattiri
5	Kottekadu	6	Pariyapuram
7	East Arikkanchina	8	Kanoor
9	Alissery	10	Naduvilakadavu
11	Vettathukavu	12	Randathani
13	Vettom Cheerpu	14	Thekkan Padiyam
15	Vadakkan Padiyam	16	Vakkad West
17	Vakkad East	18	Kanhirakutty
19	Paravanna Town	20	Puthangadi

== See also ==
- Pachattiri
- Niramarutur
- Mangalam
- Tirur
