= Panangad =

Panangad refers to the following places:

- Panangad, Kochi, a village in Ernakulam district, Kerala, India
- Panangad, Kozhikode, a village in Kozhikode district, Kerala, India
- Panangad, Thrissur, a village in Thrissur district, Kerala, India
