= Tanur Beach =

Beach in Kerala, India

Tanur Beach Thooval Theeram Beach
- Beach
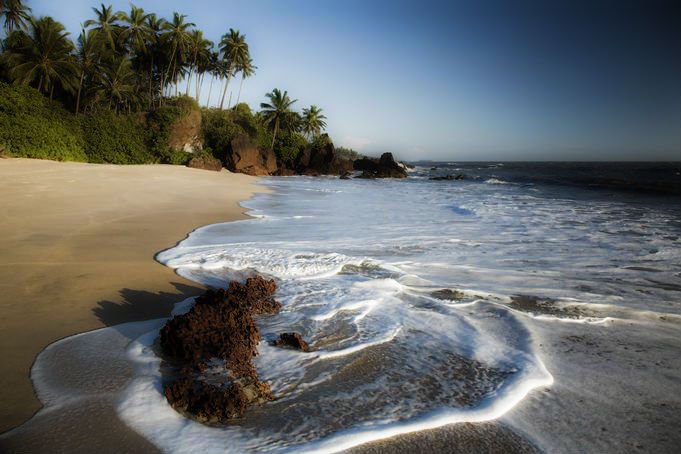
- Tanur beach

- Location within India Location within Kerala
- Coordinates: 11.0206°N 75.8563°E
- Location: Tanur, Kerala

Dimensions
  - Length: 3,700+ m
- Access: Bus Station - 2.1 m, Railway Station - 5 km, Ferry Terminal - 3.1 km

Tanur Beach also known as Thooval Theeram Beach or Ottumpuram beach, is a beach and (Azhimugam) tourist destiny at Tanur, Malappuram, Malappuram district in the Indian state of Kerala. Tanur beach is close to several beaches, Thooval Theeram Beach, Ottumpuram beach and kettungal beach All these are known together as Tanur Beach, so they are all known by the same name Tanur Beach

== Events and attraction ==
=== Floating bridge ===
The floating bridge has been designed to facilitate the visitors to walk 100 meters into the sea, over rollicking sea waves and receding tides.

== Tanur boat disaster ==
The Tanur boat accident on 2023 May7, when the recreational boat Atlantic capsized in Thooval Theeram beach in Tanur, Malappuram, Kerala, India The incident, on a boat carrying 37 people, caused 22 deaths and 10 injuries, including 11 children.

== Gallery ==
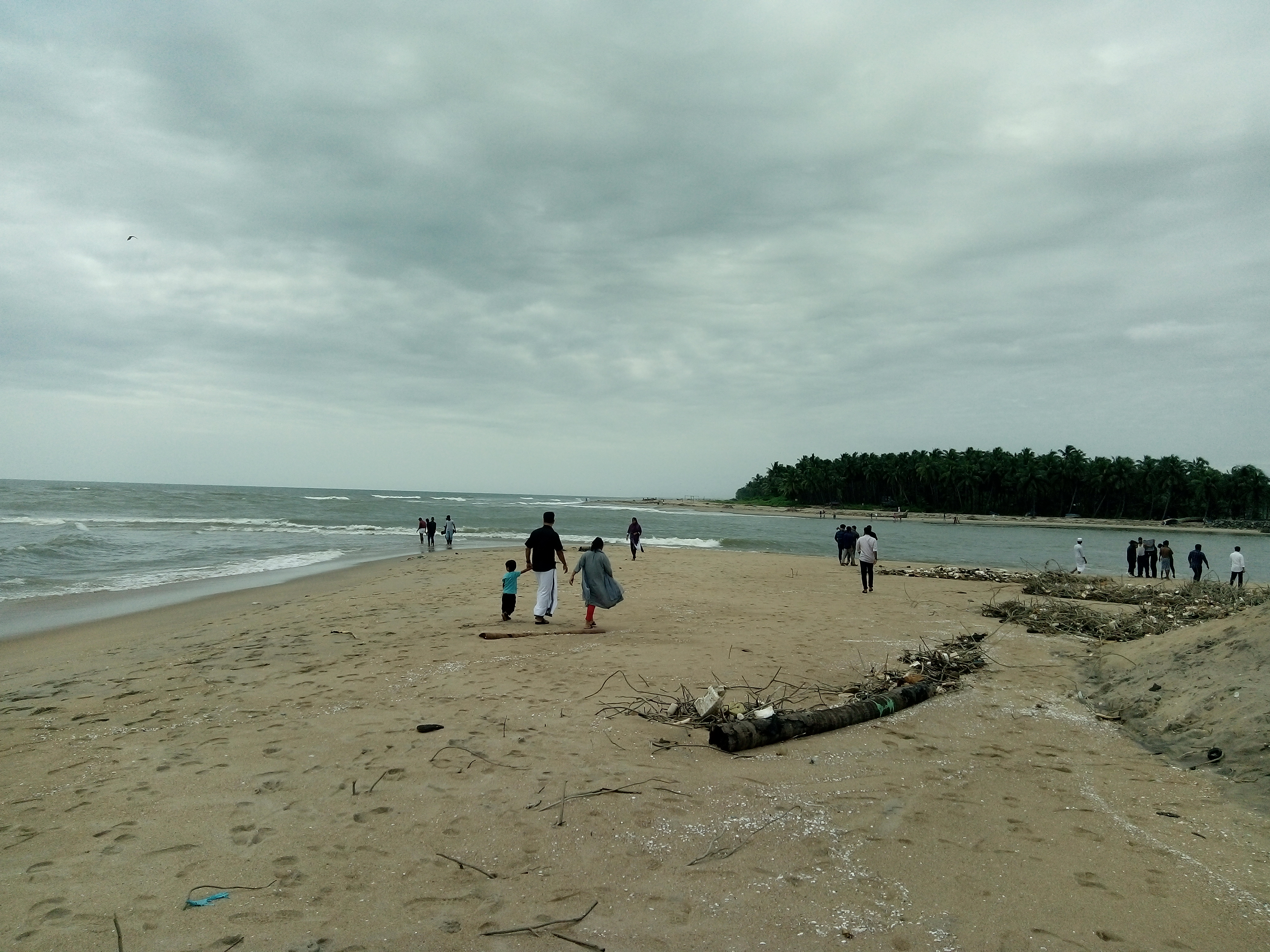

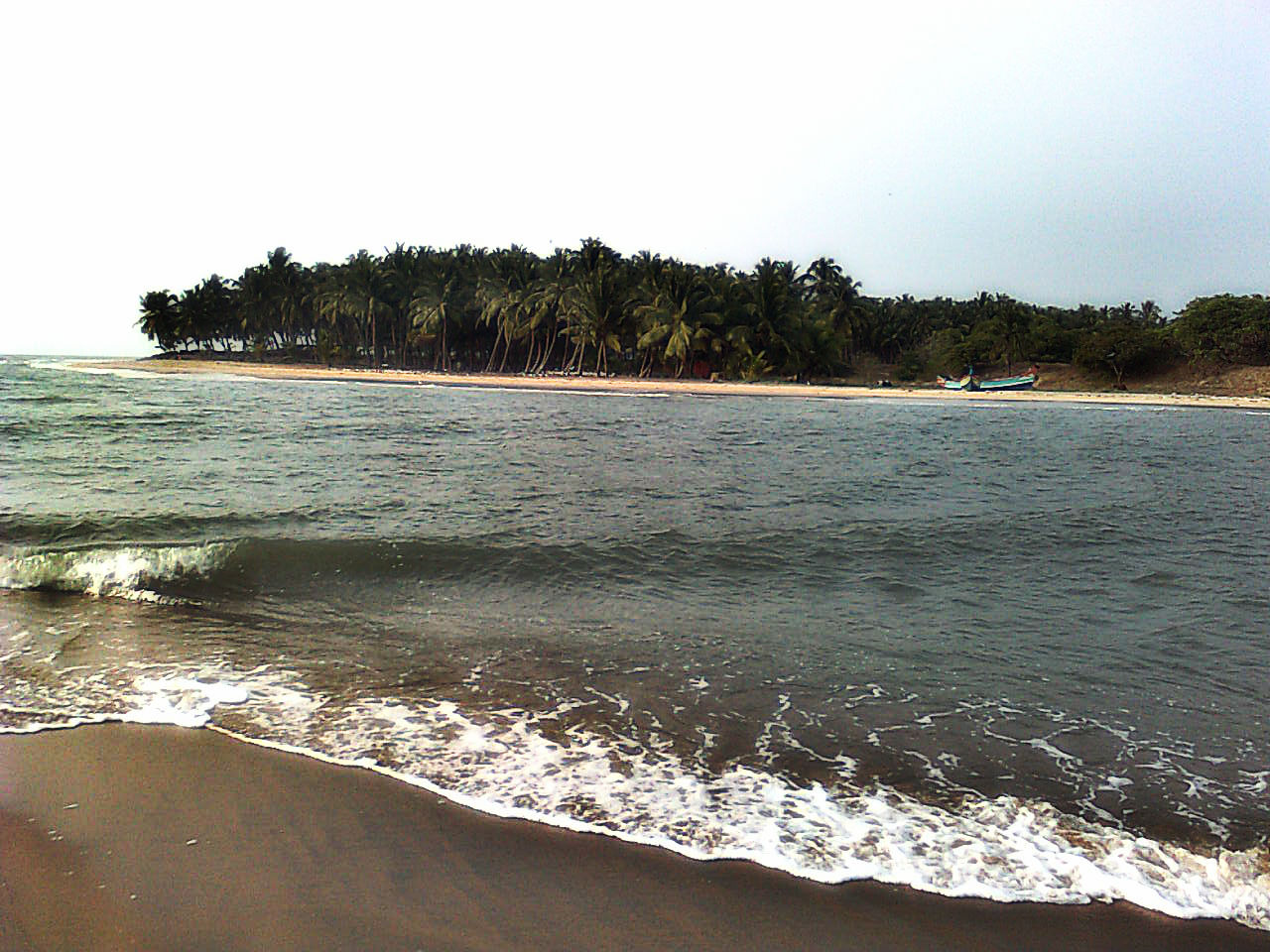

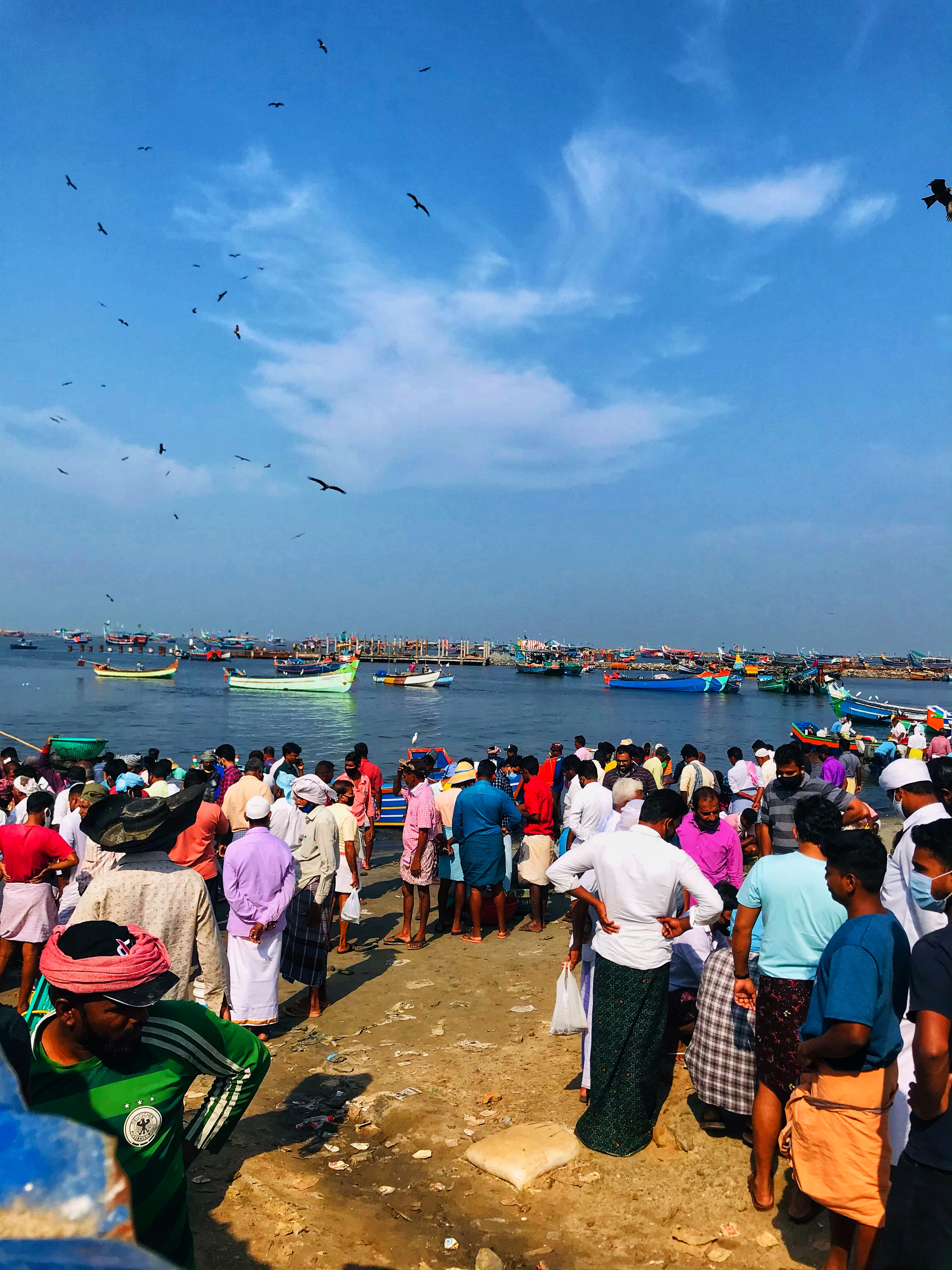

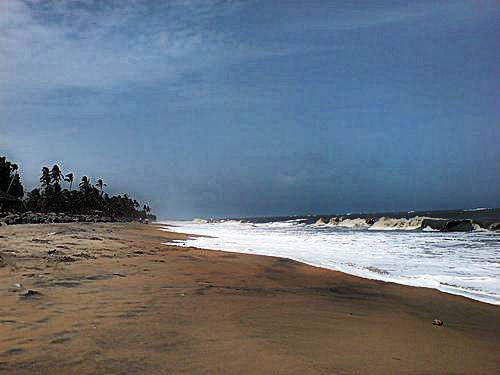

== See also ==
- 2023 Tanur boat disaster

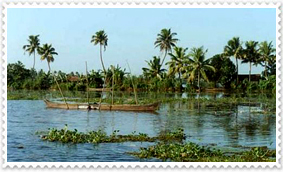
