= Thiruvalayannur =

Thiruvalayannur Thiruvalayannur / Thiruvalayannoor Thriloor / Thrilur
- village
- Country: India
- Panchayath: Vadakkekad
- District: Thrissur
- State: Kerala

Thiruvalayannur is located in Vadakkekad Panchayath, Thrissur District.

== Location ==
Thiruvalayannur is surrounded with Vadakkekad Desham and Thekkekad Desham.

== Temples ==
Thiruvalayannur (Thriloor) Mahaadeva Temple, Manikandeswaram Ayyappa Temple and Thiruvalayannur High School are located here. Most of its part is housing colonies.

Vadakkekad is located 30 km away from Thrissur Railway Station, 10 km away from Guruvayoor Railway station and 12 km away from Kunnamkulam Bus stand.
