= Vylathur =

- village
- Location in Kerala, India
- Coordinates: 10°38′10″N 76°0′40″E
- Country: India
- State: Kerala
- District: Thrissur

Government
  - Body: Panchayat

Languages
  - Official: Malayalam
- Time zone: UTC+5:30 (IST)
- PIN: 679563
- Telephone code: 0487
- Vehicle registration: KL-08 or KL-46
- Coastline: 0 kilometres (0 mi)
- Nearest city: Kunnamkulam or Guruvyur
- Lok Sabha constituency: Thrissur
- Climate: Tropical monsoon (Köppen)
- Avg. summer temperature: 35 °C (95 °F)
- Avg. winter temperature: 22 °C (72 °F)

Vylathur is a village in Thrissur district in Kerala state in south India, close to Guruvayoor. The commercial town of Kunnamkulam is also a few minutes drive. The post office which serves the place is Nhamanghat (Pin Code 679563).

Vylathur is a multi-religion centre. The St. Cyriac's Church is located in Vylathur. It famous for its festival of St Cyriac and St Sebastian. Sri Thrikkanamukku Siva temple is famous for the Sivarathri festival.

The commercial centre of this place is Nayarangadi.

Assembly constituency is Guruvayoor and parliament constituency is Thrissur and belongs to Vadakkekad panchayath.

== Education ==
- St. Francis U P school
- Sacred Heart L P school
- A. L. P. School
- A. M. L. P. School

Few other parallel institutions also running here

== Banks ==
- Catholic Syrian Bank Ltd
- South Indian Bank Ltd

== Transport ==
Vylathur is connected by bus operating from Kunnamkulam and Guruvayoor to Ponnani via Althara. The nearest railway station is Guruvayoor. Thrissur railway station is 30 km away from Vylathur. Cochin International Airport and Calicut Airport are equidistant from here.

== Agriculture ==
The main agricultural revenue is from coconut. Paddy fields also are part of the agriculture.
