= Mannalamkunnu =

Mannalamkunnu Beach

Mannalamkunnu (Mandalamkunnu, മന്ദലാംകുന്ന്) is a beach located in Thrissur district, in the western coastal area of the state of Kerala, India.

It is located in Punnayur Panchayath. It is a tourist destination in Thrissur district. Punnayurkulam the birthplace to many award-winning writers Nalappat Narayana Menon, Nalappatt Balamani Amma and Kamala Das to name the few. about 3 km away.

It hosts an annual festival called the Mannalamkunnu Beach Festival. The beach lies about 10 km away from Chavakkad and it is approximately 40 km away from Thrissur. The pin code of this beach is 680518.

The beach also has a children's park which was inaugurated in 2020. Mandalamkunnu beach vikasana samithi care takes the beach and its amenities.
