= Vadakkekad Gram Panchayat =

Gram Panchayat in Thrissur district of Kerala, India

Vadakkekad Panjayath consists of two villages; Vadakkekad and Vylathur. It is located in Thrissur District of Kerala in the south-west region of India on the Malabar coast.
