= Manikandeswaram Uma Maheswara Temple =

Hindu temple in Kerala, India

- Manikandeswaram Uma Maheswara Temple, Vadakkekad, Thrissur, Kerala

Religion
- Affiliation: Hinduism
- District: Thrissur
- Deity: Uma Maheswara
- Festival: Maha Shivaratri

Location
- Location: Vadakkekad
- State: Kerala
- Country: India
- Interactive map of Manikandeswaram Uma Maheswara Temple
- Coordinates: 10.6538°N 76.0062°E

Architecture
- Type: Architecture of Kerala

Specifications
- Temple: One
- Elevation: 33.23 m (109 ft)

Manikandeswaram Uma Maheswara temple or Manikandeswaram Siva Temple is a Hindu temple dedicated to Shiva and Parvati, in Vadakkekad, Thrissur district, Kerala, India. Believed to be more than two thousand years old, this is one of the oldest temples in India. It is also one of the rare temples where Shiva and Parvati reside in the same sanctum sanctorum (sreekovil) with Ganapati right outside. The concept is that of Shiva holding Parvati with his left palm while Ganapati is sitting on Parvati's lap.

== History ==
Vadakkekkad, where the temple is located, was supposed to be a thickly forested area with a river flowing to the east. The flora and fauna has disappeared since but there exists a canal which flows to the east. It came under the kingdom of Malabar.

Manikandeswaram temple was attacked by Tipu Sultan in 1790. He destroyed the ‘Ana mathil’ ( heavily built wall modeled on an elephant) and ransacked the temple . All the money and valuables kept in the temple were taken away. He also cut off the face of ‘ Nandi’ and ‘Dwarakapalakan’ statues in the temple. These statues are still kept in the temple in a damaged state.

Zamorin was king of Malabar, also called Calicut and hence the temple came under his rule. He in turn entrusted the management of the temple to three kingdoms, Eliyangad, Cheralayam and Manakkulam, including tax collection from the associated land.

It owned around 800 acres of land in Kerala, much of which was lost due to land reforms act in Kerala in the mid-1960s, and some due to encroachment. A lot of temples in Kerala could not afford to conduct day-to-day poojas after land reforms since they lost most of their assets, but Uma Maheswara temple continued daily poojas even then, albeit on a lower scale.

== Legend ==
There is a banyan tree within the temple premises – famous poet Vallathol Narayana Menon apparently composed part of Magdalana Mariyam in the shades of this tree. It was the favourite haunt of Kuttikrishna Marar famous for his magnum opus Bharathaparyadanam.

== The temple structure ==
Temple is spread over an acre of land and consist of medium-sized temple pond along with temples of Palakkal Bhagavathy (form of Durga), Ayyappa outside the main temple building. Palakkal Bhagavathy is considered to be in asura gana and Uma Maheswara temple in deva gana. The main building has a Shiva temple (called Vadakke Shiva, named as such due to the position of idol) apart from 'Shiva kudumbam (family)'.

There are numerous sculptures around the sreekovil which are considerably older than the construction around it, but their exact age has not been ascertained.

Oottupura (The dining hall) in the temple was once famous for lavish feasts that fed more than 3000-3500 thousand people every day according to Malabar Manual by William Logan. This was the only Oottupura in a long stretch of distance when the only means of transport was walking, and it fed all the travellers passing-by from Ponnani to Guruvayur. Parts of its roof were manufactured centuries ago. Upper floor has a small window which was used by rulers to supervise the arrangements and ensure that all the guests were well taken care off.

Temple has a ‘Janma nakshatrakkavu’ which has trees associated with all the ‘stars’ of a Malayalam month (twenty seven in all, from Aswathy to Revathi). This is again a rare occurrence.

== Importance of the temple ==
Uma Maheswara temple is family deity of more than thousand Tharavadus (each of which is further subdivided into many families) and still follow a number of rituals practiced since olden days.

== Temple administration and Pooja details ==
The temple comes under Malabar devaswom board and is run by a four-member trustee board. Puliyanur is the ‘thanthri’ of the temple. There are morning and evening sessions with several ceremonies. Offerings may be made for various purposes, including improvement of marriage prospects, children, curing diseases and achieving objectives.
