= Puthantheru =

- town
- Location in Kerala, India Puthantheru (India)
- Coordinates: 10.97°N 75.87°E
- Country: India
- State: Kerala
- District: Malappuram
- Elevation: 1 m (3.3 ft)

Languages
  - Official: Malayalam, English
- Time zone: UTC+5:30 (IST)
- PIN: 676307
- Vehicle registration: KL 55

Puthantheru is a small town on the coastline between Tirur and Tanur Malappuram district of Kerala state, South India. Previously it was called Theru, but as the town developed its name became Puthantheru ("New Street"). It comes under Tanalur Gram panchayat.

== History ==
Puthantheru was a part of the Kingdom of Tanur (Vettathunad) in medieval times. It is the part of Kerala deeswarapuram village. It was one of the oldest Muslim settlements of India; many mosques and Islamic sites are situated here. Hindu Temples and educational institutions are here.

== Places of interest ==
- Kattil Thangal Makam, a historic Muslim pilgrimage site, known as 'Jarathingal/KT Jaram' about 1 kilometre (0.62 mi) east of Puthatheru
- Puthantheru Mahall Jumua Masjid, beautiful major masjid and it is the landmark of puthantheru
- Sree Ganaphathy Temple, an old temple and colony located near the town
- CHM Govt. Arts & Science college Tanur, located in town.
- Devadhar Govt. School, major school in Kerala state.
- ITC Puthantheru, ITC for SC/ST communities. located near town.
- Handi Craft Unit, Rarest handicraft unit in state. located near town.
- Thwaiba Garden, An educational and cultural spot located near Devadhar School

== People ==
Over 5,000 people live Puthantheru town and vicinity. 80% people are Muslims and 19% are follows Hindu religion. 99% of the Muslim follow the Sunni branch of Islam. The major Muslim Federation is the Kerala State Sunni Students Federation (SSF) and Samastha Kerala Sunni Yuvajana Sangam (SYS).

== Transportation ==
Puthentheru is the major town in Kerala Deeswarapuram Village. It connects to other parts of India through Tirur town. National highway No.66 passes through Tirur and the northern stretch connects to Goa and Mumbai. The southern stretch connects to Cochin and Trivandrum. Highway No.966 goes to Palakkad and Coimbatore. The nearest airport is at Kozhikode. The nearest major railway station is at Tirur.
