= Punnayur =

Coordinates: 10°39′N 76°00′E

- Village
- Interactive map of Punnayur
- Country: India
- State: Kerala
- District: Thrissur

Population (2011)
  - Total: 19,387

Languages
  - Official: Malayalam, English
- Time zone: UTC+5:30 (IST)
- PIN: 679562 ( For Punnayur South & North )
- Telephone code: 0487
- Vehicle registration: KL-46
- Nearest city: Chavakkad, Guruvayur
- Lok Sabha constituency: Thrissur
- Vidhan Sabha constituency: Guruvayur

Punnayur is a Panchayath in Thrissur district in the state of Kerala, India.This village has coastal area, Mannalamkunnu Beach is one of tourist destination in Trissur District . The office, co-op bank and Punnayur Village are located in Edakkara. Edakkara is one of the small area of Punnnayur Panchayth, Edakkazhiyur, Agalad, Kuzhingara, Aviyur Mannalamkunnu and Punnayur are the other places. Punnayur is located 35 km from Thrissur railway station, 12 km from Guruvayoor railway station, and 90 km from Kochi International Airport. Edakkara is very close to NH 17, (Ponnani- Chavakkad).

India's largest Public Aquarium, Marine World is now at Panchavadi Beach, Edakkazhiyoor.

== Demographics ==
As of 2011 India census, Punnayur had a population of 19,387, with 9,108 males and 10,279 females.
