= Ponmundam =

Coordinates: 10.9628°N 75.9519°E

- Census town
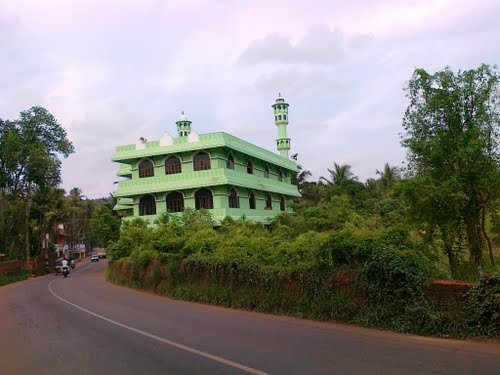
- Ponmundam Juma Masjid
- Interactive map of Ponmundam
- Country: India
- State: Kerala
- District: Malappuram

Population (2011)
  - Total: 25,855

Languages
  - Official: Malayalam, English
- Time zone: UTC+5:30 (IST)
- PIN: 676 106
- Telephone code: 0494
- Vehicle registration: KL-
- Nearest city: Tirur Kottakkal
- Climate: moderate (Köppen)

Ponmundam is a census town in the Malappuram district of Kerala, India. The Malappuram–Tirur state highway passes through the area. In medieval times, Ponmundam formed part of the Kingdom of Tanur (Vettathunad).

== History ==
The name "Ponmundam" was given by Mamburam Thangal, who had a strong relationship with the village. He married a girl from the Neduvanchery Family called Ayesha. Her tomb is inscribed 'Ayesha Malabaria Ponmundam', who was the sister of chief commander of the "Cheroor Pada", Mr. Saidalavi Neduvanchery. Folklore relates that at the time most people in the village were poor until Thangal told foretold that this village would become a "Ponmundum" meaning 'Land OF Riches'.

== Landmarks ==
Ponmundam Mahallu Juma Masjid is situated near the state highway. The current Khazi of Ponmundam is VTS Hashim Thangal. His late father VTS Kunju Thangal, his late elder uncle Attakkoya Thangal (popularly known as Valiyapputty Thangal), and VTS Cheruthu Thangal were all great leaders of Ponmundam and served as its Khateebs. They were the rulers and spiritual guides of the Ponmundam Mahallu.

The Khazi family of Ponmundam has a remarkable history of over 500 years of service. VTS Kunju Thangal also served as the president of the SYS Tanur Mandalam Committee, making significant contributions to the community.

The main educational institution in the village is Ponmundam Higher Secondary School, along with a few private institutes. At present, most of the natives of Ponmundam work in the Gulf countries, especially in Al Ain and other parts of the UAE. Unfortunately, almost all of them (about 99.99%) live a bachelor life there, as they are employed in low-salaried jobs.

Politically, this village support left and right parties depending on current situations and some time it shows some religious cult bias also. Any how, for Legislative and Parliament elections it support mainly Indian Union Muslim League.

The main agricultural products of Ponmundam are coconut, areca nut, and betel leaf. Areca nut and betel leaves are exported to North India and Pakistan through nearby local markets such as Thalakkadathur and Pan Bazar, Tirur, via railway and road networks. About 15 years ago, this region had vast stretches of paddy fields, but most of them were later filled and converted into residential plots. As a result, agriculture has now declined and is no longer a profitable livelihood for many.

Palace Hotel near Tirur Railway Station has a nostalgic memory of old railway travellers, which also hails from this village. Nearby, Kulangara is a beautiful place known for its traditional culture, history, sports, and agriculture. True to its name (since “kulam” in Malayalam means pond), Kulangara is also famous for its scenic ponds, which are an attraction of the area

== Sports Clubs ==
"This area takes pride in hosting three renowned football clubs: Youthwing Arts and Sports Club Ponmundam, Parammal PRC, and OSP, all of which have played a vital role in shaping the sporting history of this locality. In addition, Kasa Kulangara, a prominent club from Kulangara near Ponmundam, also holds an important place in the region’s sports culture."

== Printing Industry ==
In the field of Arabic print media, especially for Arabic colleges and Islamic publications, this village has made significant contributions through Al Aman Kitab Bhavan, which originated from Al Huda Bookstall in Calicut, and Al Jalal from Tirur.

== Population ==
As of 2011 India census, Ponmundam had a population of 25855 with 11901 males and 13,954 females.

== Transportation ==
Ponmundam village connects to other parts of India through Tirur town. National highway No.66 passes through Valanchery and the northern stretch connects to Goa and Mumbai. The southern stretch connects to Cochin and Trivandrum. Highway No.966 goes to Palakkad and Coimbatore. The nearest airport is at Kozhikode. The nearest major railway station is at Tirur.

== See also ==
- Kavapura
