= Tanalur =

- Census town
- Location in Kerala, India Tanalur (India)
- Coordinates: 10°57′0″N 75°54′35″E
- Country: India
- State: Kerala
- District: Malappuram

Population (2011)
  - Total: 47,976

Languages
  - Official: Malayalam, English
- Time zone: UTC+5:30 (IST)
- PIN: 676 307
- Vehicle registration: KL-55 &KL-10

Tanalur is a census town in Malappuram district in the state of Kerala, India. It is a suburban town of neighbouring Tanur Municipality and comes under Tanur Block as well as Tanur (State Assembly constituency). It falls under Tirur Taluk.

== Wards of Tanalur ==
Tanalur Grama Panchayat

Tanalur Grama Panchayat is composed of the following 23 wards:

Ward no.	Name	Ward no.	Name
1	Moolakkal	2	Devadhar
3	Puthantheru	4	Pandiyatu
5	Parengath	6	Tharayil
7	Theendapara	8	Pakara North
9	Thavalaamkunnu	10	Areekad
11	Areekad Nirappu	12	Pakara South
13	Meenadathur East	14	Meenadathur West
15	Moochikkal	16	Valiyapadam
17	Thanalur	18	Vattathani
19	Kainipadam	20	Puthukulangara
21	Pattaruparamba	22	Kundungal
23	Keraladheeshwarapuram		

== Demographics ==
As of 2011 India census, Tanalur had a population of 47976 with 22743 males and 25233 females.

== Transportation ==
Tanalur village connects to other parts of India through Tirur town. National highway No.66 passes through Tirur and the northern stretch connects to Goa and Mumbai. The southern stretch connects to Cochin and Trivandrum. Highway No.966 leads to Palakkad and Coimbatore. The nearest airport is at Kozhikode. The nearest major railway station is at Tirur, Tanur. Other mode of transport which is more reliable can be Kerala State Road Transport Corporation buses.

== See also ==
- Puthantheru
- Tanur
- Kingdom of Tanur
