= Kavapura =

- District: Malappuram
- State: Kerala
- Country: India

Government
  - Type: Democratic

Population (201)
  - Total: 23,000
- Time zone: IST (UTC+5:30)

Kavapura is a small village/hamlet in Tirur Taluk in Malappuram District of Kerala State, India. It comes under Ozhur Panchayath. It belongs to North Kerala Division. It is located 20 km towards west from District headquarters Malappuram. 6 km from Tanur. 349 km from State capital Thiruvananthapuram.

Kavapura Pin code is 676313 and postal head office is Ozhur.

Kavapura is surrounded by Tirurangadi Taluk towards North, Tirur Taluk towards South, Vengara Taluk towards North, Malappuram Taluk towards East .

Tirur, Malappuram, Ponnani, Perinthalmanna are the nearby Cities to Kavapura. It is a Muslim Village

It is near to Arabian Sea.

== Transportation ==
Kavapura village connects to other parts of India through Tirur town. National highway No.66 passes through Tirur and the northern stretch connects to Goa and Mumbai. The southern stretch connects to Cochin and Trivandrum. Highway No.966 goes to Palakkad and Coimbatore. The nearest airport is at Kozhikode. The nearest major railway station is at Tirur.
