= Perumanna-Klari =

Perumanna-Klari Perumanna
- Census town
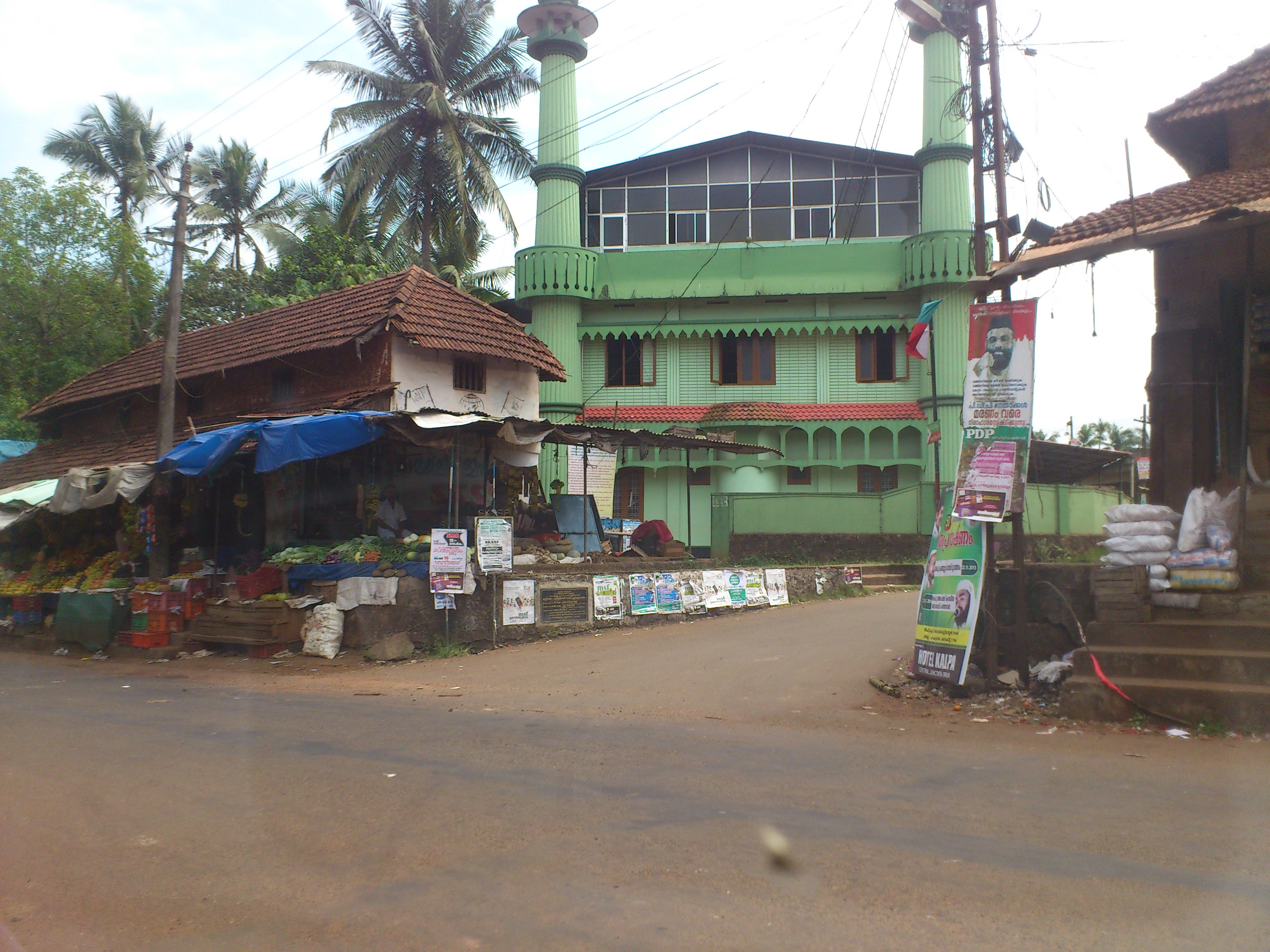
- Kuttippala Juma Masjid, Perumanna

- Location in Kerala, India Perumanna-Klari (India)
- Coordinates: 10.982°N 75.947°E
- Country: India
- State: Kerala
- District: Malappuram
- Panchayat formation: 2 October 2000; 25 years ago

Government
  - Type: Grama Panchayat
  - Body: Perumanna-Klari Grama Panchayat
  - President: Fathima Pothuvath
  - Vice president: C. K. Abdul Jabbar

Area
  - Total: 11.28 km^{2} (4.36 sq mi)

Population (2011)
  - Total: 27,278
  - Density: 2,418/km^{2} (6,260/sq mi)

Languages
  - Official: Malayalam

Human Development
  - Sex ratio (2011): 1148 ♀/1000♂
  - Literacy (2011): 94.27%
- Time zone: UTC+5:30 (IST)
- PIN: 676501, 676508, 676551
- Telephone code: 0494
- Vehicle registration: KL-55
- Nearest towns: Kottakkal; Tirurangadi; Tirur; Tanur
- Niyamasabha constituency: Tirurangadi
- Block Panchayat: Tanur
- Website: lsgkerala.in/perumannaklaripanchayat/

Perumanna-Klari, also known as Perumanna, is a census town and a Gram panchayat in Tirur Taluk, Malappuram district, Kerala, India. The village is located 39 kilometres (24 mi) south-west of the city of Malappuram.

== Local administration ==
The region is administered by the Perumanna-Klari Grama Panchayat. It is composed of 16 wards:

Ward	Name	Party	Alliance	Member
1	Perumanna North	IUML	UDF	Hajara pokkat
2	Kozhichena	IUML	UDF	Raseena Rasheed C.
3	Chenapuram	IUML	UDF	Libas Moidheen
4	Palachiramadu	IUML	UDF	Jamsheera Sharafudheen
5	Kanhikuzhingara	IUML	UDF	Musthafa Kalathingal
6	Klari South	IUML	UDF	Hafsath P
7	Moochikkal	IUML	UDF	Jasna Teacher
8	Kurukathani	CPI(M)	LDF	Sreerega Mullancheri
9	Kazhungilapadi	CPI(M)	LDF	Cholayil Ismail
10	Puthoor	IUML	UDF	Mohamed Safvan Pappali
11	Kunnathiyil	IUML	UDF	CK. Shamsu
12	Klari-Ottuparapuram	CPI(M)	LDF	Saidu PK
13	Cholamattupuram	CPI(M)	LDF	Najma jamsheer
14	Chettiyamkinar	IUML	UDF	Kunjumoidheen kattukulath
15	Kizhakkinithara	IUML	UDF	Jubairiya Akbar
16	Perumanna South	IUML	UDF	Shaju Kattakath(Pramodh)
