= Edakkazhiyur =

Edakkazhiyoor, Edakkaliyur Edakkazhiyoor Chavakkad
- village
- EDAKKAZHIYOOR
- Location in Kerala, India Edakkazhiyoor, Edakkaliyur (India)
- Coordinates: 10°37′7.252″N 75°59′33.408″E
- Country: India
- State: Kerala
- District: Thrissur

Government
  - Type: President Panchayat
  - Body: Government of Kerala

Population (2011)
  - Total: 17,335

Languages
  - Official: Malayalam, English
- Time zone: UTC+5:30 (IST)
- PIN: 680515
- Vehicle registration: KL-46

Edakkazhiyoor is a place in Punnayur Panchayat at Thrissur district in the state of Kerala, India on the sides of NH66 formerly H17 (Chavakkad - Ponnani). Edakkazhiyur has BSNL Telephone Exchange (0487- 2615…) under Thrissur SDCA.

The Punnayur branch of State Bank of India (SBI), South Indian Bank (SIB), Seethi Sahib Memorial Higher Secondary School (SSMVHSS), and the Government Public Health Center are located at Edakkazhiyoor serving the region.

CISO MARINE WORLD is India's largest public aquarium. Marine World is located at Edakkazhiyoor Chavakkad, Thrissur.

== Demographics ==
As of 2011 India census, Edakkazhiyur had a population of 17335 with 8093 males and 9242 females.
