= Iringavoor =

Iringavoor is a town located in east side of Tirur municipality in Malappuram district, Kerala state. There are multiple small villages involved in the Iringavoor region. Meeshapadi, Kuruppinpadi, Vaniyannur, Mandakathinparambu, Thiruthummal, Ambalamkunnu, are the major villages involved in Iringavoor.mandagathin paramb temple.

== Transportation ==
Iringavoor village connects to other parts of India through Tirur town. National highway No.66 passes through Tirur and the northern stretch connects to Goa and Mumbai. The southern stretch connects to Cochin and Trivandrum. Highway No.966 goes to Palakkad and Coimbatore.

The nearest airport is at Kozhikode. The nearest major railway station is at Tirur.
