= Ozhur =

- village
- Location in Kerala, India Ozhur (India)
- Coordinates: 10°57′15″N 75°55′0″E
- Country: India
- State: Kerala
- District: Malappuram

Population (2001)
  - Total: 29,836

Languages
  - Official: Malayalam, English
- Time zone: UTC+5:30 (IST)
- PIN: 6XXXXX
- Vehicle registration: KL-55

Ozhur is a village in the Malappuram district of the state of Kerala, India. The village was a part of the Kingdom of Tanur (Vettattnad) in medieval times.

== Demographics ==
As of the 2011 India census, Ozhur had a population of 34,016 with 15,807 males and 18,209 females. The Entire village consists of the entire panchayat by the same name Ozhur Panchayat. It consists of 18 wards .

Ward No.	Ward Name
1	ONAKKAD
2	ERANELLUR
3	KURUVATTISSERY
4	KORAD
5	OMACHAPPUZHA
6	VARIKKOTTUTHARA
7	MANALIPPUZHA
8	ESTATEPADI
9	KARINGAPPARA
10	PARAMMAL
11	PERINCHERY
12	MELMURI
13	AYYAYA SOUTH
14	AYYAYA NORTH
15	THALAKKATTUR
16	OZHUR
17	KATHIRKULANGARA
18	VETTUKULAM

== Transportation ==
Ozhur village connects to other parts of India through Tirur town. National highway No.66 passes through Tirur and the northern stretch connects to Goa and Mumbai. The southern stretch connects to Cochin and Trivandrum. Highway No.966 goes to Palakkad and Coimbatore. The nearest airport is at Kozhikode. The nearest major railway station is at Tirur.

- Railway Station: Tirur railway station is one of the major railway stations in the Malabar region. Almost every train stops here, connecting the Malappuram district to the rest of the country.
- Nearest Airport: Calicut International Airport is approximately 35 kilometres away.

== Educational institutions ==
The following are the main educational institutions in Ozhur Panchayath.

Name	Type	Sector
AMUP School, Ayyaya, Ozhur	UP School	Aided
C P Pocker Haji Memorial Higher Secondary School	Higher Secondary	Aided
GLP School, Ozhur	LP School	Govt
Veda Vyasa Vidyanikethan, Ozhur	UP School	Private
Ayyaya Aided Muslim LP School	LP School	Aided
Down AMLP School, Pakara	LP School	Private

Aided Mappila LP school, Thalakkattur |LP School |Aided |-
