= Vadakkekad =

- Town
- Location in Kerala, India Vadakkekad (India)
- Coordinates: 10°38′28″N 76°0′56″E
- Country: India
- State: Kerala
- District: Thrissur

Area
  - Total: 13.72 km^{2} (5.30 sq mi)

Population (2023)
  - Total: 21,700
  - Density: 1,718/km^{2} (4,450/sq mi)

Languages
  - Official: Malayalam, English
- Time zone: UTC+5:30 (IST)
- PIN: 679562
- Telephone code: 0487
- Vehicle registration: KL-46
- Coastline: 0 kilometres (0 mi)
- Nearest city: Kunnamkulam, Guruvayur
- Sex ratio: 1134 : 1000 ♂/♀
- Literacy: 100%
- Lok Sabha constituency: Guruvayur
- Climate: Tropical monsoon (Köppen)
- Avg. summer temperature: 35 °C (95 °F)
- Avg. winter temperature: 20 °C (68 °F)

Vadakkekad is a village located in the Thrissur district of Kerala, India. As of 2023, the village has a population of over 21,000 people. The village hosts several educational institutions, including more than two government-run higher secondary schools, two English medium schools (ICA and Rahmath), and one college (ICA). Additionally, there are various private education centers such as Bright Education Centre, Talent Education Centre, and Akshara.

The primary source of income for the village comes from remittances sent by residents working in Gulf Cooperation Council (GCC) countries. The Indian National Congress and the Communist Party of India are the most influential political parties in Vadakkekad. The village also hosts various organizations, including the ESA Vadakkekad club, which has its own sports teams in Kerala and the UAE, and a football ground in Erinjippadi.

Vadakkekad is known for its tourist attractions and is one of the wealthiest villages in the Thrissur district2. Kapliyangad Sree Bhagavathy temple is near Vadakkekad.

The village is also notable for the K.P. Namboodiris Ayurvedic Tooth Powder factory, whose products have a global presence. One of the largest primary health centers in India is located in the center of Vadakkekad.

Vadakkekad is situated 30 km from Thrissur railway station, 10 km from Guruvayoor railway station, and 9 km from Kunnamkulam bus stand.

== See also ==
- Manikandeswaram Uma Maheswara temple
