= Niramarutur =

- village
- Location in Kerala, India Niramarutur (India)
- Coordinates: 10°55.6′0″N 75°54.2′0″E
- Country: India
- State: Kerala
- District: Malappuram

Population (2011)
  - Total: 29,846

Languages
  - Official: Malayalam, English
- Time zone: UTC+5:30 (IST)
- PIN: 676109
- Vehicle registration: KL-55
- Nearest city: Calicut (43 km)
- Lok Sabha constituency: Ponnani
- Legislative Assembly constituency: Tanur

Niramaruthur is a sandy coastal village and a Gram Panchayat in Tirur Taluk of Malappuram district, in the state of Kerala, India. The nearby municipal towns are Tanur and Tirur.

== History ==
Niramaruthur was under Tanaloor Panchayat, and divided in 1997, the area included Unniyal beach, also canoli canal joining in Ponnani is part of Niramaruthur area. The village was a part of the Kingdom of Tanur (Vettattnad) in medieval times. Now Niramaruthur Panchayarh administered by the Communist party.

The name originated from Malabar and is related to the mountain valleys.

== Wards of Niramarutur ==
Niramarutur Grama Panchayat

Niramarutur Grama Panchayat is composed of the following 17 wards:

Ward no.	Name	Ward no.	Name
1	Puthiyakadapuram	2	Chalad
3	Chakkaramoola	4	Manjalampadi
5	Korangath	6	Karimaram
7	Aalinchuvadu	8	Pathampadu
9	Noor Maidanam	10	Mangad
11	Vallikanhiram	12	Kumaranpadi
13	Ayyappankavu	14	Janatha Bazar
15	Pancharamoola	16	Thevarkadapuram
17	Unniyal		

== Transportation ==
Niramaruthur village connects to other parts of India through Tirur town. National highway No.66 passes through Tirur and the northern stretch connects to Goa and Mumbai. The southern stretch connects to Cochin and Trivandrum. Highway No.966 goes to Palakkad and Coimbatore. The nearest airport is at Kozhikode. The nearest major railway station is at Tirur and Tanur.

== Places of Interest ==
- Unniyal beach

== Demographics ==
As of the 2011 India census, Niramaruthur had a population of 29,846 with 14,198 males and 15648 females.
