= Panangad, Thrissur =

Panangad
- village
- Location in Kerala, India Panangad (India)
- Coordinates: 10.2689200°N 76.166120°E
- Country: India
- State: Kerala
- District: Thrissur

Government
  - Type: Panchayati raj (India)
  - Body: Gram panchayat

Population (2011)
  - Total: 15,630

Languages
  - Official: Malayalam, English
- Time zone: UTC+5:30 (IST)
- PIN: 680665
- Vehicle registration: KL-

Panangad is a village in Thrissur district in the state of Kerala, India. The general area resides inside the city of S.N Puram. The area serves as Industrial region for other area's inside S.N Puram. The area also has the most Urban Neighborhoods around the place.

== Demographics ==
As of the 2011 India census, Panangad had a population of 15630 with 7392 males and 8238 females.
