= Pariyapuram =

- village
- Location in Kerala, India Pariyapuram (India)
- Coordinates: 11.014560°N 75.874630°E
- Country: India
- State: Kerala
- District: Malappuram

Population (2011)
  - Total: 24,561

Languages
  - Official: Malayalam, English
- Time zone: UTC+5:30 (IST)
- PIN: 676302
- Telephone code: 0494
- Vehicle registration: KL-53
- Nearest city: Tirur

Pariyapuram is a village in Malappuram district in the state of Kerala, India. The village was part of the Kingdom of Tanur (Vettathunadu) in medieval times.

== Demographics ==
As of the 2011 India census, Pariyapuram had a population of 24,561, with 11,849 males and 12,712 females.

== Transportation ==
The nearest airport is at Kozhikode. The nearest major railway station is at Parappanangadi.
