= Pachattiri =

- town
- Location in Kerala, India Pachattiri (India)
- Coordinates: 10°54′0″N 75°54′25″E
- Country: India
- State: Kerala
- District: Malappuram

Languages
  - Official: Malayalam, English
- Time zone: UTC+5:30 (IST)
- Vehicle registration: KL-

Pachattiri is a small village located near Tirur in Kerala, India. It lies on the banks of the Tirur River. A temple devoted to Krishna is located here, as is a temple devoted to Shiva.This was a part of the Kingdom of Tanur (Vettattnad) kingdom in medieval times.

Pachattiri is very near to Thunchanparambu. Thunchathu Ezhuthachan is the inventor of Malayalam Language. Further, Kerala's first train service commenced from Tirur to Bepur which is also very near to Pachattiri.

== Transportation ==
Pachattiri village connects to other parts of India through Tirur town. National highway No.66 passes through Tirur and the northern stretch connects to Goa and Mumbai. The southern stretch connects to Cochin and Trivandrum. Highway No.966 goes to Palakkad and Coimbatore. The nearest airport is at Kozhikode. The nearest major railway station is at Tirur.
