= Valluvanad =

Independent chiefdom in present-day central Kerala

Arangottu Swarupam
- c. 1124 CE–1793 CE
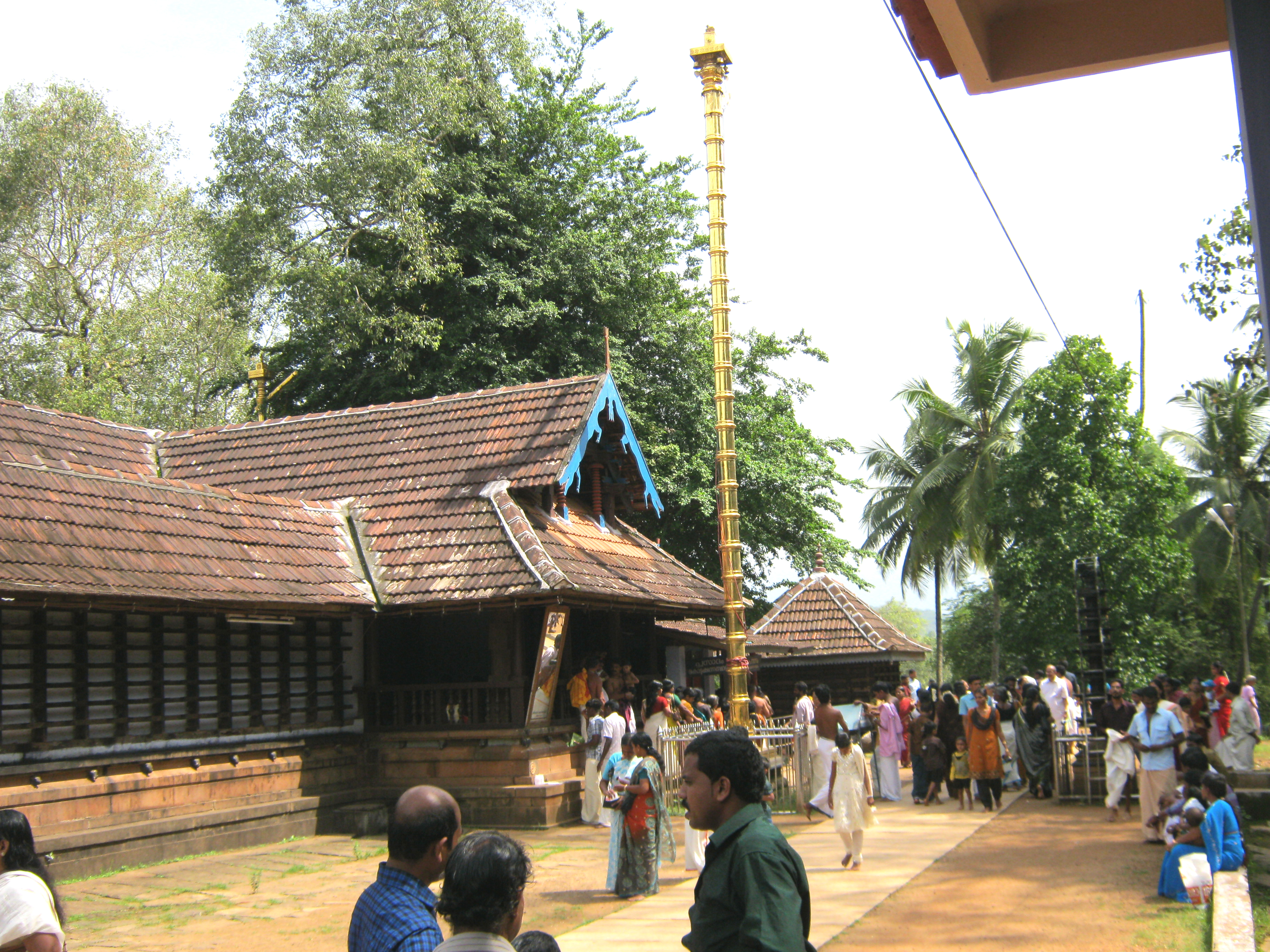
- Thirumandhamkunnu Temple
- Capital: Angadipuram (Kerala)
- Common languages: Malayalam.
- Government: Monarchy
- History
  - Established: c. 1124 CE
  - Disestablished: 1793 CE

Valluvanad (Malayalam: [ʋɐɭːuʋɐnaːɖə̆]), or the Arangottu Swarupam, was a medieval state that exerted considerable influence in the region corresponding to present-day north-central Kerala, south India, from the early 12th century until the close of the 18th century CE.

Attested as early as the late 10th century CE as a constituent chiefdom of the medieval Chera kingdom of Kerala, Valluvanad emerged as a sovereign state following the kingdom's dissolution in the early 12th century CE. It was traditionally ruled by a Nair Samanthan family known as Vellodis, similar to the Eradis of the neighboring Eranad (the Zamorins of Calicut). The rulers of Valluvanad held the title of Valluvakonathiri or Vellattiri.

The state was disestablished in 1793, with the East India Company taking over its administration directly, and the hereditary ruling family settling for a pension arrangement.

== Name variations ==
Valluvanad, also known by various transliterations such as Valluvanadu, Valluvanatu, Valluvanat, Walluvanad, and Walluvanatu, was alternatively referred to as the Arangottu Swaroopam (or Aarangottu Svarupam).

The Nair Samanthan rulers of Valluvanad held the titles of Valluvakonathiri or Vellattiri, with variations such as Vellatiri, Velatra, and Velnatera. In official treatises with the Company, the state was recognized as the kingdom of Vellattiri, and the official title of the ruler was "Vallabha Raja".

The Sanskrit name for the state was "Vallabhakshoni". The hereditary title of the ruler was Rajasekhara, sometimes written as Rayaran, Irayira Chekaran, or Irayiravar in medieval Malayalam. For instance, Rajasekhara, the ruler of Valluvanad, and his son, Vellan Kumaran, are mentioned in an inscription from Tiruvottiyur, while Rayaran Chathan, the udaiyavar (overlord) of Valluvanad, is noted in the Jewish Copper Plates from around 1000 CE.

== Culture ==
=== Ayurveda tradition ===
Valluvanad was historically associated with centres of traditional Ayurveda in Kerala, particularly in the Bharathappuzha and Nila valley regions, where temple-centred scholarship contributed to the development of medical and intellectual traditions.

Among the hereditary physician lineages associated with the region was the Pulamanthol Mooss family, belonging to the Ashtavaidya tradition of Kerala. The Ashtavaidyas were Brahmin physician families traditionally trained in the eight classical branches of Ayurveda and were known for preserving scholarly and clinical traditions based on classical Ayurvedic texts.

Pulamanthol later emerged as one of the settlements in Valluvanad associated with the preservation of Classical Kerala Ayurveda and related medical scholarship. Regional folklore traditions and cultural narratives also associate the area with Vagbhata, the classical Ayurvedic scholar credited with the Ashtanga Hridaya.

== Territorial extent ==
=== Headquarters ===
The headquarters of Valluvanad was Angadipuram, a suburb of present day Perinthalmanna, which is renowned for the Thirumandhamkunnu Temple. The traditional guardian deity of the Valluvanad royal family was Thirumandhamkunnu Bhagavati, the presiding goddess of the temple.

=== Geographical boundaries ===
The geographical boundaries of medieval Valluvanad are difficult to determine from available sources, and they varied significantly over time. Traditionally, it has been described as the region between the knolls of the Pandalur Hills (which separate the old taluks of Eranad and Valluvanad, located east of the Malappuram and Manjeri area) and Ponnani on the Arabian Sea. It probably extended from the Bharathapuzha basin in the south to the Pandalur Hills in the north. To the west, it was bounded by the Arabian Sea at the port of Ponnani, and to the east, perhaps by the Attappadi Hills.

In the 12th century, Valluvanad likely included parts of present-day Nilambur (the Nilambur-Wandoor-Kalikavu-Tuvvur area), Eranad (the Pandikkad-Manjeri-Malappuram areas), Tirur (the Tirunavaya-Athavanad-Kottakkal-Valanchery areas), and Ponnani Taluks, with the port of Ponnani serving as the primary access to the sea.

During this period, a significant portion of the Chaliyar and Kadalundi River basins may have been under the rule of the Valluvakonathiri. At its maximum extent, the northern boundary likely reached Thrikkulam at Tirurangadi in Tirurangadi Taluk, while the southern border extended to Edathara near Palakkad.

A large portion of the present-day Eranad region (Eranad and Kondotty Taluks) was originally part of the kingdom of Valluvanad before its conquest by the Zamorin of Calicut. It is believed that the Valluvakonathiri had also annexed a significant part of Nedunganad (the Pattambi-Ottapalam-Shoranur-Cherpulassery area), which had been under the rule of the Nedungathirippad. However, Nedunganad was likely incorporated into the Calicut kingdom during the 15th century CE.

== Political history ==
=== Within the medieval Chera state ===
Valluvanad was one of the constituent chiefdoms of the Chera kingdom in Kerala (until the 12th century CE). The chieftains of Valluvanad, one among the several nadu-udayavar ("rulers of the nadus"), legitimized their authority through claims of hereditary lineage and ancestral descent. The family initially appears to have exercised suzerain rights over a large territory in north-central Kerala.

The primacy of Valluvanad within the Chera state, compared to other chiefdoms, is evidenced by its leading role in supporting the Cheras militarily. Vellan Kumaran, son of "Rajasekhara", the ruler of Valluvanad, was sent by the Cheras to northern Tamil country to aid the Cholas in their battles against the Rashtrakutas. He commanded an entire contingent of Kerala military personnel under the Chola prince Rajaditya.

An inscription at the Shiva temple in Thiruvotriyur (mid-10th century CE), describing the life of Vellan Kumaran, states that he, the son of Rajasekhara, chieftain of "Vallabha Rashtra" in Kerala, went to the Chola country after completing his education in his boyhood and became a loyal subordinate of prince Rajaditya. Another record from Gramam, South Arcot, mentions that he was born at "Nandikkarai Puttur" in Malai Nadu. He was probably one of the few Chola commanders to have survived the battle of Takkolam in 948/49 AD.

The "Hundred" organization (the local militia) of Valluvanad was known as the "aru-nurruvar" (the Six Hundred). A 10th-century temple inscription from the Irinjalakuda Temple, which declares its protection by the Valluvanad Six Hundred, notably reflects the undefined territorial limits of the Hundred's jurisdiction. Rayiran Chathan, the chieftain (the udayavar) of Valluvanad, is mentioned as a witness in the Jewish copper plates of Cochin (c. 1000) issued by the Chera ruler of Kerala.

Several inscriptional references provide valuable insights into Valluvanad during this period. One such example mentions Irayira Chekaran, the chieftain of Valluvanad, participating in a temple resolution to take over the village of Tavanur and bring it under the jurisdiction of Sukapuram (Edappal). In another instance, Irayiravar, a Valluvanad chief, appears in three temple transaction-related inscriptions from Avattiputhur (present-day Avittathur near Kodungallur), highlighting his involvement in regulatory functions beyond the borders of his chiefdom. Additionally, an inscription dated to the late 10th century records the establishment of a market center at Irinjalakkuda, known as Bhaskarapuram, where responsibility for protection was entrusted to the "aru-nurruvar" (the Six Hundred) of Valluvanad. This suggests that the Hundred exercised authority beyond the traditional bounds of Valluvanad.

=== As sovereign rulers ===
With the dissolution of the Chera kingdom in the early 12th century, the various constituent chiefdoms, including Valluvanad, emerged as independent states. According to traditions, after the fall of the Cheras, the sacred right to preside over the Tirunavaya Mamankam festival — as the "Rakshapurusha" — passed on to the Vellattiris, the rulers of Valluvanad.

Valluvanad continued to assert its presence, and a ruler of Valluvanad is next mentioned as a witness in the Viraraghava Copper Plates dated to 1225 CE. In the subsequent period, the Brahmins of Sukapuram are known to have been supporters of the Valluvanad rulers.

=== Zamorin's encroachments ===
When the Zamorin (the Samoothiri), the ruler of Calicut, rose to power and became a dominant force in Kerala, he began making inroads into Valluvanad territory and eventually usurped the sacred Mamankam Rakshapurusha right, along with control over the sacred center of Tirunavaya. As a prelude to this, the Brahmin Raja of the Tirumanasseri country ceded the port of Ponnani to the Zamorin as the price for his protection from Valluvanad and Perumpatappu (later Cochin).

According to tradition, in his desperation to succeed at Tirunavaya, the Zamorin even sought divine intervention by propitiating the Tirumandhamkunnu Bhagavati (the goddess). Key locations such as Malappuram (on the road between Calicut and the Vellattiri's headquarters), Nilambur, Vallappanattukara, and Manjeri were also annexed. Kariyur Mussad, the Brahmin minister and general of the Vellattiri, was captured and executed at Pataparamba, and his lands—known as the Ten Kalams and Pantalur—were seized. The Zamorin ultimately extended his influence as far east as Nilambur.

=== Blood feud with the Zamorins ===
In retaliation for major losses to the Zamorin of Calicut—most notably the seizure of the port of Ponnani and the sacred Tirunavaya—the Vellattiri began dispatching bands of suicide warriors, known as "Chavers", to ritually challenge and attempt to kill the Zamorin during the Mamankam festival. This commitment was a symbolic effort to reclaim their rightful authority over the ceremony.

According to historians, "... the caver[s] of Valluvanatu died fighting to avenge the death or defeat of their master and died fighting regularly at Tirunavaya for a long period. It means that the caver[s] died fighting at Tirunavaya even after many generations. Thus it takes the form of blood feud ..."

=== In early modern period ===
The area marked as "Valluvanad Proper" in the East India Company records was the sole remaining territory under the control of the Valluvanad "Raja" in late 18th century AD. By this period, it had become a minor, landlocked state situated in the north-central region of Kerala.

Valluvanad Proper comprised a number of amsams that were part of the 1887 Valluvanad and Ernad Taluks. These included Angadipuram, Perintalmanna, Kodur, Kuruva, Pallippuram, Mangada, Arakkuparamba, Chettanallur, Pulakkattiri, Valambur, Karyavattam, Nenmini, Panga, Kolattur, Kuruvambalam, Pulamantol, Elamkulam, Vettattur, Kottapadam, Arakurissi, Tachambara, Anamangad, Paral, Chembrasseri, and Pandikkad.

Certain regions — collectively referred to as "Walluvanad" — had been annexed by the Zamorin of Calicut, from the Vellattiri rulers ("most recently"). These included Tuvur, Tiruvalamkunnu, Tenkara, Kumaramputtur, Karimpula, Tachanattukara, and Aliparamba.

=== Mysore's invasion ===
The rulers of Mysore invaded and annexed Kerala in the late 18th century CE. As a result, the ruler of Valluvanad and his family, like other Hindu rulers of Kerala, fled and sought refuge in the southern state of Travancore.

The Nedumpuram Palace, located near Thiruvalla, Pathanamthitta, was associated with the Valluvanad royal family.

Subsequently, like the rest of northern Kerala, the Nairs of Valluvanad were no longer allowed to retain their land without paying revenue or tribute to the ruler, as per the ancient traditions of the land (since they were obliged to follow the Valluvanad ruler in his battles). Temple properties and Brahmin-owned lands, granted by the rulers, were also confiscated and included in the state revenue.

=== Takeover by the Company ===
By the Treaty of Seringapatam (1792), the state of Mysore ceded half of its territories, including northern Kerala, to the English East India Company.

The Valluvanad Raja, who had returned from exile in Travancore (where he and the royal family had been since around 1788), requested the holding of the territories he laid claim to as a manager for the Company. The claimed territories included Millattoor, Angarypooram, Vanarcaddo, Kaapil, and the three districts of Congaad, Manoor, and Edratura, which had formerly belonged to Palgautcherry. This was granted according to an agreement, valid for one year, between the Raja (or through his representative Kariat Moosa) and Company representatives William G. Farmer Esq. and Major Alexander Dow, concluded at Kozhikode on 30 July 1792.

The Raja undertook to pay a sum of Rs. 38,410.20 to the Company within the year (the sum was later increased to Rs. 41,594.20). The agreement also mandated revenue collection from all minor landholders who, prior to Mysore rule, had only contributed to battle efforts. Essentially, the agreement sought to continue revenue collection as per the changes made by the Mysore rulers. Appointment of ministers or other employees in government, or those engaged in revenue collection, had to be with the consent of the Company. The agreement also stipulated that only the Company's merchants had the right to procure pepper grown in Valluvanad. A detachment of sepoys was also to be stationed at Angadipuram.

In May 1793, the Joint Commissioners dismissed the Valluvanad Raja and assumed direct management of Valluvanad. Inability to preserve the peace of the district (primarily due to Mappila uprisings prevalent in the region) and a shortfall in revenue collections were cited as the main reasons. The dispute over the management of the three districts formerly belonging to Palgautcherry had led to the withdrawal of Raja's authority over those districts even earlier. A pension agreement was then settled between the Valluvanad Raja and the Company. All five sthanis and both thampurattis of the royal family were eligible to receive malikhana under the Company.

== The royal family ==
The guardian deity of the Valluvanad royal family was the Bhagavati or the presiding goddess of the Thirumandhamkunnu Temple.

=== Origins ===
The hereditary rulers of Valluvanad was known as the "Arangottu Swaroopam", possibly because the ancestral home of the family was located at Arangode or Arangottukara, along the Bharathappuzha River near present-day Shoranur. Another possible location for the ancestral home of the family is in the present-day Kuruva-Makkaraparamba area, as evidenced by the Arangottu Shiva Temple located there. Kuruva is situated near Mankada, where a Kovilakam of the Valluvanad royal family, known as Mankada Kovilakam, still exists.

=== Family structure ===
The ruling family of Valluvanad, which followed the traditional Nair matrilineal system, was divided into a senior and a junior lineage. The senior lineage was further divided into four branches or thavazhis: Aripra, Mankada, Kadannamanna, and Ayiranazhi. The junior lineage was known as the Vellodis.

The five eldest sthanis (male designates) of the royal family, in order of seniority, were titled as follows: Valluvakkonathiri or Vellattiri (the eldest sthani and the ruler), Vellalpadu, Thacharalpadu, Edathralpadu, Kolathur Thampuran, and Padinjarekkara Thampuran. The Padinjarekkara Thampuran was nominated by the Vellattiri and held certain privileges and rights over landed property. The two senior-most female members (thampurattis) held the titles of Kulathur Thampuratti and Kadanna Mootha Thampuratti. In addition, the eldest female member of each kovilakam (palace) held her own rights and privileges.

== Administration ==
The administrative officials of Valluvanad comprised various members of the local nobility. Karuvayoor Moosad served as the Brahmin chief minister, while Kunnathattil Madambil Nair, also known as the Mannarghat Nair, was the chieftain (desavazhi) responsible for overseeing the eastern boundary and the hilly regions of Valluvanad. Chondathil Mannadiar, also referred to as Puthumana Panicker, and Nair of Kavada were also part of the administrative system.

In addition to these key figures, there were 14 notable dignitaries collectively known as swaroopis. This group comprised two Namboothiris, two members of the Valluvanad royal family, four Panickers, and several other individuals, including Elampulakkad Achan, Kulathur Warrier, Uppamkalathil Pisharody, Pathiramanna Vellodi, Parakkatt Nair, Kakkoott Nair, Mannarmala Nair, Kongad Nair, Naduvakkat Nair, and Cherukara Pisharody.

== Legacy ==
Walluvanad Taluk in the erstwhile Malabar District

=== Walluvanad Taluk ===
After the annexation of northern Kerala, the Company administered the region as the "Malabar District". It was divided into several taluks, most of which closely followed the boundaries and names of the pre-modern states. As a result, the former Valluvanad became the Walluvanad Taluk. The taluk, which comprised 64 amsoms, was established in 1860–61. Its headquarters was located at Perinthalmanna, situated approximately three kilometers (1.9 miles) from the historic Angadipuram.

Until the 1860s, Nedunganad—which included the Pattambi, Ottapalam, and Cherpulassery regions located south of the Thuthapuzha—was a separate taluk. It was originally the domain of the Nedungathirippad and had been under the administrative control of the Zamorin of Calicut. Nedunganad was merged with Walluvanad Taluk only in the 1860s.

Walluvanad Taluk was divided into four administrative divisions ("nads"): Vellattri or Walluvanad Proper, Walluvanad, Nedunganad, and Kavalappara.

1. Vellattri or Walluvanad Proper

Vellattri, or Walluvanad Proper, represented the territory that remained under the control of the Valluvanad Raja at the time of the Mysore invasion. This division consisted of 26 amsoms:

- Kodur
- Kuruva
- Mangada
- Pallipuram
- Valambur
- Karyavattam
- Nenmini
- Melattur
- Vettattur
- Kottapadam
- Arakurissi
- Tachambara
- Arakkuparamba
- Chettallur
- Angadipuram
- Perintalmanna
- Pulakkattiri
- Panga
- Kolattur
- Kuruvambalam
- Pulamantol
- Elankulam
- Anamangad
- Paral
- Chembrasseri
- Pandikkad

2. Walluvanad

Walluvanad was a later acquisition by the Zamorin of Calicut from the Valluvanad Raja. This region included 7 amsoms:

- Tuvvur
- Tiruvalamkunnu
- Tenkara
- Kumaramputtur
- Karimpula
- Tachanattukara
- Aliparamba

3. Nedunganad

Nedunganad, the ancestral land of the Nedungadis, had been under the control of the Zamorin of Calicut for a considerable period of time. This division was made up of 27 amsoms:

- Elambulasseri
- Vellinali
- Srikrishnapuram
- Kadampalipuram
- Kalladikod
- Vadakkumpuram
- Muttedattamadamba
- Trikatiri
- Chalavara
- Cherppulllasseri
- Naduvattam-Karalmanna
- Kulukkalaur
- Chundampetta
- Vilayur
- Pulasseri
- Naduvattam
- Mututala
- Perumudiyur
- Netirimangalam
- Pallippuram
- Kalladipatta
- Vallapula
- Kotakurissi
- Eledattamadamba
- Chunangad
- Mulanyur
- Perur

4. Kavalappara

Kavalappara was a region ruled by local Nair chieftains, who maintained a nominal allegiance to both the Zamorin of Calicut and the Kingdom of Cochin. It included 6 amsoms:

- Mundakodkurissi
- Panamanna
- Koonattara
- Karakkad
- Kulappalli
- Mundamuka

Walluvanad Taluk was one of the two taluks, along with Eranad Taluk, that were later added to form the Malappuram Revenue Division in the Malabar District.

== See also ==
- Vettathunadu
- Ponnani
- Zamorin of Calicut
