= Perinthalmanna taluk =

Perinthalmanna Taluk
- Taluk
- Location in Malappuram district, Kerala, India
- Coordinates: 11.152610°N 75.956678°E
- Country: India
- State: Kerala
- District: Malappuram
- Revenue division: Perinthalmanna
- Headquarters: Perinthalmanna
- Revenue villages: 24: List; Nenmini; Thazhekkode; Elamkulam; Angadippuram; Koottilangadi; Keezhattur; Valambur; Pathaikara; Melattur; Vadakkanagara; Edappatta; Vettathur; Moorkkanad; Mankada; Karyavattam; Aliparamba; Perinthalmanna; Arakkuparamba; Puzhakkattiri; Kuruvambalam; Anamangad; Kuruva; Kodur; Pulamanthole

Languages
  - Official: Malayalam, English
- Time zone: UTC+5:30 (IST)
- Vehicle registration: KL-53
- Executive officer: Tahasildar

Perinthalmanna Taluk, formerly known as Walluvanad Taluk, comes under Perinthalmanna revenue division in Malappuram district of Kerala, India. Its headquarters is the town of Perinthalmanna. The taluk encompasses 24 revenue villages. Perinthalmanna Taluk contains Perinthalmanna Municipality and 15 Gram panchayats. Most of the administrative offices are located in the Mini-Civil Station at Perinthalmanna.

== Geography ==
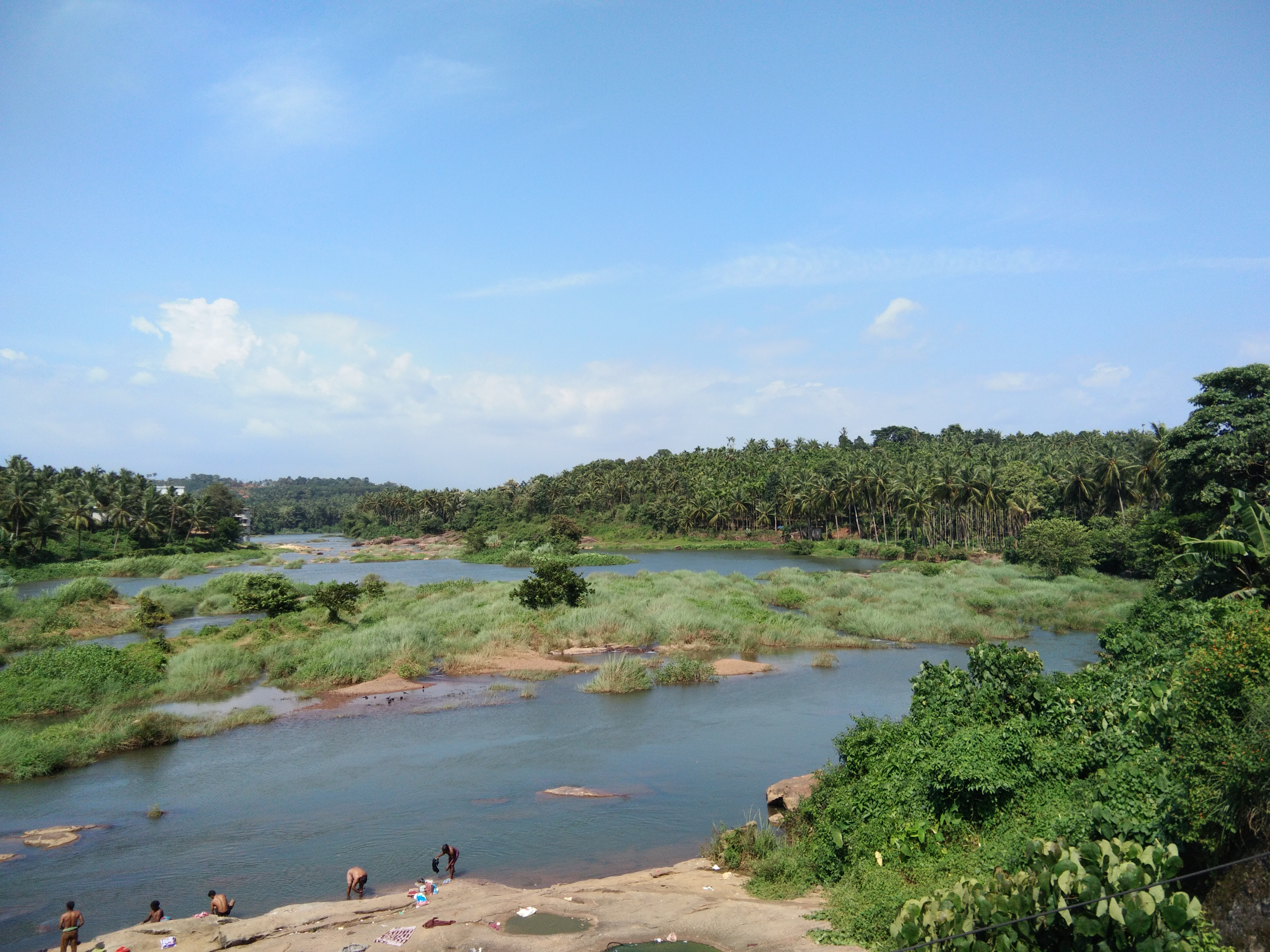
Thuthapuzha river separates Perinthalmanna taluk from Palakkad district

Perinthalmanna Taluk is bounded by Kadalundi River (Eranad Taluk) to north, Thuthapuzha River (a tributary of Bharathappuzha) to south, Kuttippuram block of Tirur Taluk to west, and Mannarkkad Taluk (Silent Valley) to east.

== History ==
Walluvanad Taluk in the erstwhile Malabar District

Perinthalmanna was the headquarters of the Old Walluvanad Taluk in the British Malabar District. Walluvanad Taluk was divided into six Revenue blocks: Mankada, Perinthalmanna, Mannarkkad, Ottapalam, Sreekrishnapuram, and Pattambi. Walluvanad was one of the two Taluks included in the Malappuram Revenue Division (the other being Eranad Taluk) of British Malabar. On 1 November 1957, the Walluvanad Taluk was divided into two: Perinthalmanna Taluk and Ottapalam Taluk. The Revenue blocks of Mankada, Perinthalmanna, and Mannarkkad were included in the Perinthalmanna Taluk, while Ottapalam, Sreekrishnapuram, and Pattambi were transferred to the newly formed Ottapalam Taluk. Later Attappadi Revenue block was separated from Mannarkkad Block.

During the formation of Malappuram district on 16 June 1969, it was separated from Palakkad district and Revenue blocks of Mannarkkad and Attappadi were separated from Perinthalmanna Taluk to form Mannarkkad Taluk. Now, Perinthalmanna Taluk has 24 villages.

== Villages ==
The taluk contains 24 revenue villages:

1. Aliparamba
2. Anamangad
3. Angadippuram
4. Arakkuparamba
5. Edappatta
6. Elamkulam
7. Kariavattom
8. Keezhattur
9. Kodur
10. Koottilangadi
11. Kuruva
12. Kuruvambalam
13. Mankada
14. Melattur
15. Moorkkanad
16. Nenmini
17. Pathaikara
18. Perinthalmanna
19. Pulamantol
20. Puzhakkattiri
21. Thazhekode
22. Vadakkangara
23. Valambur
24. Vettathur

== Municipality and panchayats ==
The taluk contains 2 block panchayats:

1. Perinthalmanna Block Panchayat
2. Mankada Block Panchayat

The taluk contains 1 municipality and 15 panchayats:

1. Perinthalmanna Municipality
2. Alipparamba Panchayath
3. Angadippuram Panchayath
4. Edappatta Panchayath
5. Elamkulam Panchayath
6. Keezhattur Panchayath
7. Kodur Panchayath
8. Koottilangadi Panchayath
9. Kuruva Panchayath
10. Mankada Panchayath
11. Melattur Panchayath
12. Moorkkanad Panchayath
13. Pulamanthole Panchayath
14. Puzhakkattiri Panchayath
15. Tazhekkode Panchayath
16. Vettathur Panchayath

== Historical maps ==
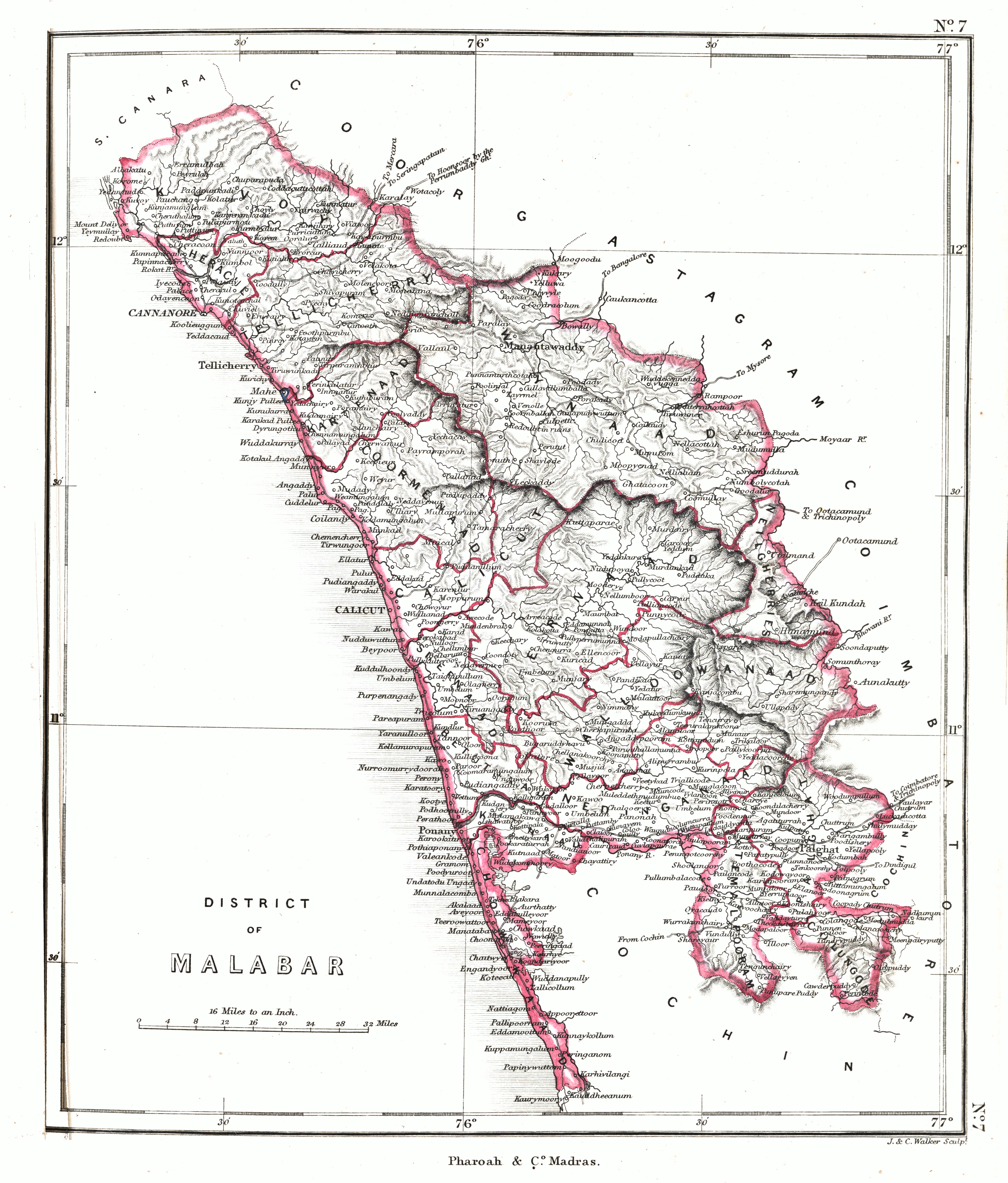
Malabar District in 1854

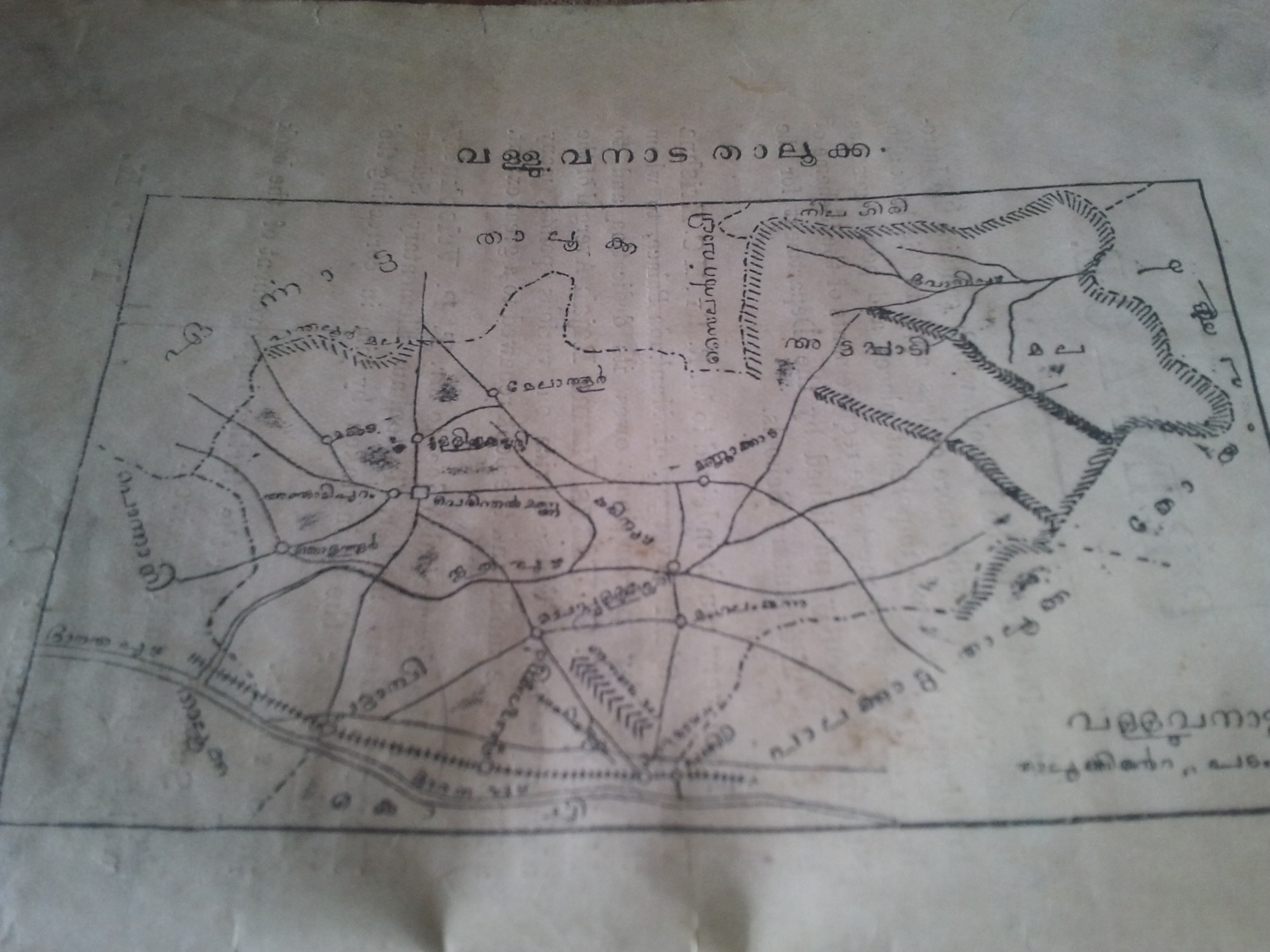
Valluvanad Taluk in 1909

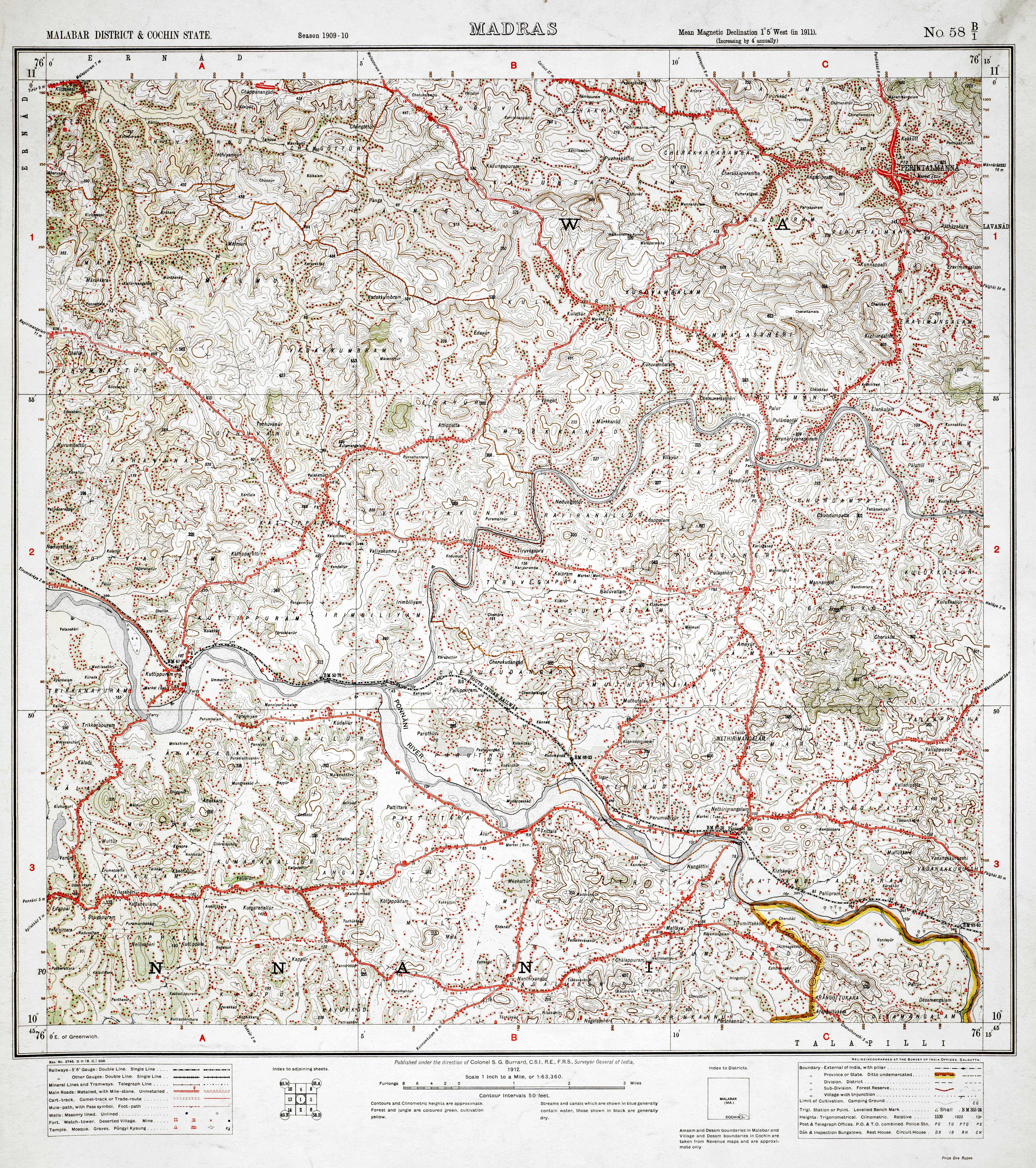
An area of Valluvanad Taluk in 1912

Malabar District in 1951

== See also ==
- List of villages in Malappuram district
- List of Gram Panchayats in Malappuram district
- List of desoms in Malappuram district (1981)
- Revenue Divisions of Kerala
