= Perinthalmanna Block Panchayat =

Local body in Kerala, India

- പെരിന്തൽമണ്ണ ബ്ലോക്ക് പഞ്ചായത്ത്

Block Panchayat overview
- Formed: 1964; 62 years ago
- Jurisdiction: Perinthalmanna Block (231.79 km²) (Excluding Municipal areas)
- Headquarters: Block Development Office, Perinthalmanna Malappuram district, Kerala, 679322
- Block Panchayat executives: Najma Thabsheera, President; Haris C.K., Vice President
- Website: perinthalmannablockpanchayat.lsgkerala.gov.in

Perinthalmanna Block Panchayat is a local governing body in Malappuram District, Kerala, India.It is a block panchayat functioning as the intermediate tier of Kerala's three-tier Panchayati Raj system of local self-government. It was established in 1995 in accordance with the Kerala Panchayat Raj Act of 1994. The block panchayat is headed by a president and vice president, and its members are elected by voters from 19 electoral division.

The incumbent president of the Perinthalmanna Block Panchayat is Adv. Najma Thabsheera.
It is coterminous with the Perinthalmanna CD block and comprises 8 gram panchayats.

The Block Panchayat comprises eight Gram Panchayats and is responsible for rural development in the surrounding areas of Perinthalmanna, excluding the municipal area.

== Functions ==
The block panchayat is responsible for coordinating and implementing development programmes at the block level. Block panchayat is primarily responsible for rural development, agricultural development, drinking water, health, education, poverty alleviation, and coordination of employment generation schemes.

General informations about Perinthalmanna Block
Attribute	Details (2011 census)
Area	274.44 km^{2}
Population (2011)	2,96,070
Divisions	19
Gram panchayats	8

== Block Panchayat Council ==
Perinthalmanna Block Panchayat is divided into 19 divisions, with each member elected from a division. Adv. Najma Thabsheera (IUML) has been the president of the Perinthalmanna Block Panchayat since 2025. The current vice president is C.K Haris (INC).

The Perinthalmanna Block Panchayat has four standing committees: Finance, Development, Welfare, and Education and Health. Each standing committee is headed by a chairperson. The Finance Standing Committee is generally chaired by the vice-president of the Block Panchayat.

== Wards/Divisions ==
Perinthalmanna Block Panchayat Wards (2025)
Ward no.	Name	Ward no.	Name
1	Nenmini	11	Thootha
2	Keezhattoor	12	Kunnakkavu
3	Melattur	13	Elamkulam
4	Chemmaniyodu	14	Pulamanthole
5	Kariavattam	15	Kuruvambalam
6	Vettathur	16	Pariyapuram
7	Arakkuparambu	17	Thirurkkad
8	Thazhekode	18	Angadipuram
9	Anamangad	19	Valamboor
10	Aliparamba		

== Jurisdiction ==
It comprises eight gram panchayats and responsible for the block-level administration of the following Gram panchayats:

- Aliparamba Gram Panchayat
- Anamangad Gram Panchayat
- Elamkulam Gram Panchayat
- Pulamanthole Gram Panchayat
- Thazhekkode Gram Panchayat
- Vettathur Gram Panchayat
- Melattur Gram Panchayat
- Keezhattur Gram Panchayat

Grama panchayats in Perinthalmanna Block
Sl.	Gram Panchayat	Wards	Population (2011)	Area (Sq.km)	President	Party	Alliance
1	Aliparamba	24	41,725	34.37	Ayisha Mekkottil	IUML	UDF
2	Angadipuram	24	56,451	38.50	Shabeer Karumukkil	IUML	UDF
3	Elamkulam	18	26,456	21.31	Shaheena Teacher	IUML	UDF
4	Keezhattur	22	36,317	40.00	P.K Moosakkutty	IUML	UDF
5	Melattur	18	27,250	27.24	Ramseena Mujeeb	IUML	UDF
6	Pulamanthole	23	37,785	32.15	Sudha Pottipara	IUML	UDF
7	Thazhekkode	24	41,982	45.03	Hussain Kallappadan	IUML	UDF
8	Vettattur	19	28,104	35.84	Sulaikha Karimbana	IUML	UDF

== Elections ==
The Kerala State Election Commission is responsible for conducting the elections.

=== Perinthalmanna Block Panchayat Election 2025 ===
Perinthalmanna Block Panchayat Election 2025
S.No.	Party name	Party symbol	Number of Members
01	UDF		17
02	LDF		02
03	NDA		00

== See also ==
- Local government in Kerala
- Panchayat samiti
