= Manathmangalam =

Manathumangalam
- Village
- Nickname: Mgm
- Location of Manathumangalam in India Manathumangalam (Kerala)
- Coordinates: 10°59′35″N 76°13′32″E
- Country: India
- State: Kerala
- District: Malappuram
- Revenue Division: Perinthalmanna
- Taluk: Perinthalmanna
- Village: Perintalmanna
- Town: Perinthalmanna
- Local Government: Perinthalmanna Municipality
- Electoral Wards: 2 - Manathumangalam 3 - Kakkooth 7 - Kumarakulam

Government
  - Type: Municipality
  - Body: Perinthalmanna Municipality
  - Councilor: M M Sakkeer Hussain (UDF)
- Postal code (PIN): 679322
- Telephone code: 04933
- Vehicle registration: KL 53
- State Assembly Constituency: Perinthalmanna
- Loksabha Constituency: Malappuram

Manathmangalam, also known as Manathumangalam, is an important commercial area and an electoral ward of Perinthalmanna Municipality, Malappuram district in Kerala State of India. It's also a neighbourhood of Perinthalmanna.

Manathumangalam is located in Perinthalmanna village in Perinthalmanna Taluk of Perinthalmanna Revenue Division of Malappuram District in Kerala. Manathumangalam is the second ward of Perinthalmanna Municipality. M.M Sakkeer Hussain is the current councilor of Manathumangalam.

== Law and order ==
Manathumangalam falls under the jurisdiction of Perinthalmanna police station.

== Educational institutions ==
1. Aided Model Lower Primary School Manathumangalam

2. Al Fathah English Medium School. Poopalam

3. Oraphanage UP School, Poopalam

4. Darul Falah English Medium School, Pooppalam

5. MSTM Arts & Science College Pooppalam

6. Al Jamia Arts & Science College Pooppalam.

== Youth clubs ==
1. Hiross Arts, Sports & Tourism Club Kunnumpuram, Manathmangalam.
2. Yas Arts & Sports Club, Manathumangalam
