= Najma Thabsheera =

Indian politician and advocate from Kerala High Court

President of Perinthalmanna Block Panchayat
- Incumbent
- Assumed office 27-12-2025
- Constituency: Valambur division

National Secretary of IUML's Muslim Youth League
- Incumbent
- Assumed office April 2024

State general secretary of Haritha
- In office 2018–2021

National Vice-President of Muslim Students Federation
- In office 5 January 2018 – 2023
- Preceded by: Adv Akmal Pasha
- Succeeded by: Najwa Haneena

Welfare Standing Chairperson of Perinthalmanna Block Panchayat
- In office 2020–2025

Personal details
- Born: 30 June 1995 (age 31) Kottakkal, India
- Party: Indian Union Muslim League
- Spouse: Adv. P.A. Nishad
- Education: Government Law College, Kozhikode (Bachelor of Laws); University of Calicut (Master of Laws)
- Occupation: Politician; Advocate from Kerala High Court social worker
- Website: najmathabsheera.com

Najma Thabsheera also known as Adv. Najma Thabsheera (born 30 June 1995) is an Indian lawyer and politician from the Indian Union Muslim League (IUML) party from Kerala. She is currently serving as the President of the Perinthalmanna Block Panchayath. She is an advocate of the High Court of Kerala by profession and also currently serves as the National Secretary of IUMLs Muslim Youth League. She is the former National Vice President of the Muslim Students Federation, and she is practicing as a lawyer in the High Court of Kerala.

== Personal life and education ==
Najma was born on 30 June 1995 in Kottakkal, Malappuram district, Kerala. Najma is the daughter of Mohamed Hidayathulla (father) and Thwayyiba Paravath (mother). She did her schooling in AMUPS Parappur and Higher School in PKMM Higher Secondary School Edarikode Kottakkal. She graduated with a Bachelor of Laws from Government Law College, Kozhikode and Master of Laws from University of Calicut. Najma is married to P.A. Nishad, a lawyer at the Kerala High Court.

== Political career ==
Najma Thabsheera entered politics through her activism in the Muslim Students Federation in 2013 and worked as treasurer and general secretary of the MSF Haritha Kozhikode district. and in 2018 State general secretary of Haritha. she entry into electoral politics occurred in September 2020 when she contested in the Perinthalmanna Block Panchayat She then became an active politician from Indian Union Muslim League. In 2020, She elected as the Welfare standing committee chairperson of Perinthalmanna block panchayath and in 2024 National Secretary of IUML's Muslim Youth League. she was elected as the first women member in history in such a committee.

== Awards and achievements ==
- Top 5 in Inspiring 100 Muslim women leaders of Kerala
- Finalist in Malayala Manorama - Manorama News Newsmaker 2021
- Selected in IVLP programme by US state department in 2024

=== Media and television show ===
Year	Show	Channel	Notes
2022	CONCLAVE	Manorama News	

== Political views ==
- Intervention against anti-people government policies in Kerala
- Najma supports feminism and has responded for it
- Criticized and opposed Citizenship Amendment Act
