= Pariapuram =

- village
- Location in Kerala, India Pariapuram (India)
- Coordinates: 10°57′0″N 76°11′0″E
- Country: India
- State: Kerala
- District: Malappuram

Languages
  - Official: Malayalam, English
- Time zone: UTC+5:30 (IST)
- PIN: 679321
- Telephone code: 04933
- Vehicle registration: KL-53
- Nearest city: Kozhikode
- Climate: Typical Kerala climate (Köppen)

Pariapuram is a dhesam (village sub-division) situated near Angadipuram village of the Malappuram District of Kerala in the country of India. The nearest town is Perintalmanna.

== Culture ==
Pariapuram village is a predominantly Muslim populated area. Hindus exist in comparatively smaller numbers. So the culture of the locality is based upon Muslim traditions. Duff Muttu, Kolkali and Aravanamuttu are common folk arts of this locality. There are many libraries attached to mosques giving a rich source of Islamic studies. Most of the books are written in Arabi-Malayalam which is a version of the Malayalam language written in Arabic script. People gather in mosques for the evening prayer and continue to sit there after the prayers discussing social and cultural issues. Business and family issues are also sorted out during these evening meetings. The Hindu minority of this area keeps their rich traditions by celebrating various festivals in their temples. Hindu rituals are done here with a regular devotion like other parts of Kerala.

== Transportation ==
Pariapuram village connects to other parts of India through Perinthalmanna town. National highway No.66 passes through Tirur and the northern stretch connects to Goa and Mumbai. The southern stretch connects to Cochin and Trivandrum. Highway No.966 goes to Palakkad and Coimbatore. The nearest airport is at Kozhikode. The nearest major railway station is at Tirur. Pariapuram's fame rests upon the schools it possesses.
