= Kodikuthimala =

Mountain in Kerala

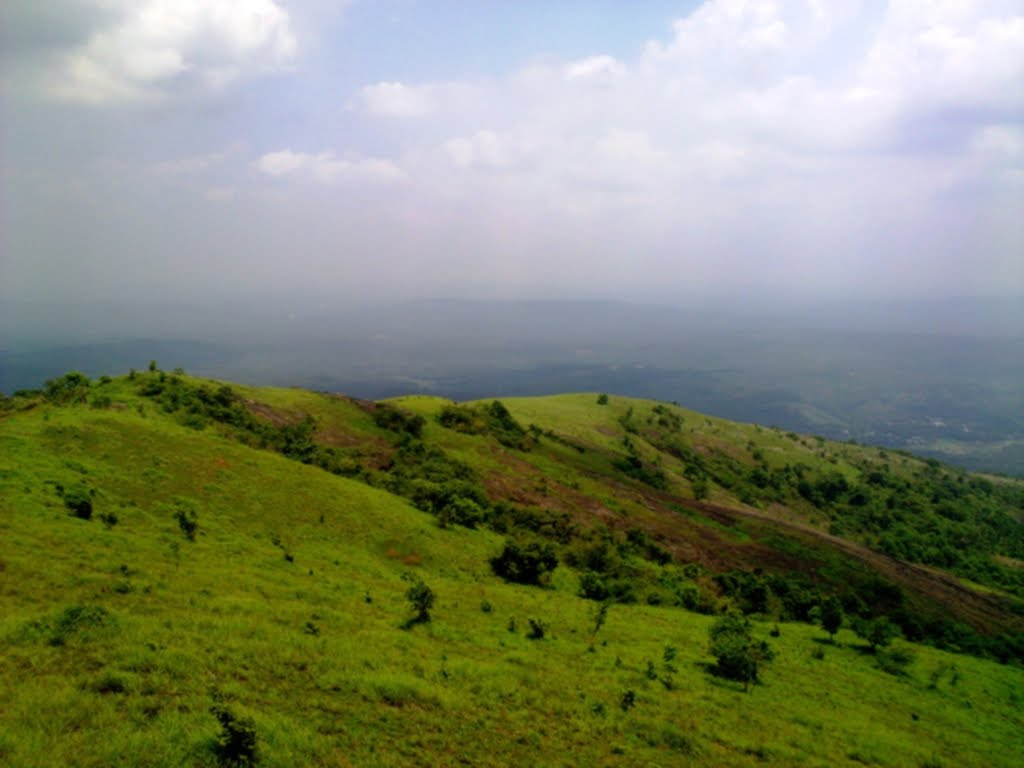

Highest point
- Elevation: 540 m (1,770 ft)

Geography
- Location: Perinthalmanna taluk, Malappuram district, Kerala, India
- Parent range: Amminikkadan mountain

Geology
- Mountain type: Free-standing mountain

Climbing
- Easiest route: From Perinthalmanna, via Amminikkad

Kodikuthimala, also known as the Ooty of Malappuram and Mini Ooty is a hill station in amminikkad and Thazhekode villages, in Kerala, India. At a height of 540 metres (1,770 ft) above sea level, it is the highest peak in Amminikkadan hills.

The British hoisted their flag on this hilltop during a survey, thus getting the name Kodikuthimala. Around 70 acres of land in this area is earmarked by the Tourism Department for various projects. Kodikuthimala, at an altitude of 1,713-ft above sea level, has a watch tower that is visited by tourists because of the vantage point it offers. It is located 9 km from Perintalmanna, 32 km from Malappuram, 66 km from Palakkad and 82 km from Calicut.
