= Perinthalmanna Assembly constituency =

Constituency of the Kerala legislative assembly in India

Perinthalmanna
- Constituency No. 38 for the Kerala Legislative Assembly
- Perinthalmanna LAC Map

Constituency details
- Country: India
- Region: South India
- State: Kerala
- District: Malappuram
- Lok Sabha constituency: Malappuram
- Established: 1957
- Total electors: 2,17,959 (2021)
- Reservation: None

Member of Legislative Assembly
- 16th Kerala Legislative Assembly
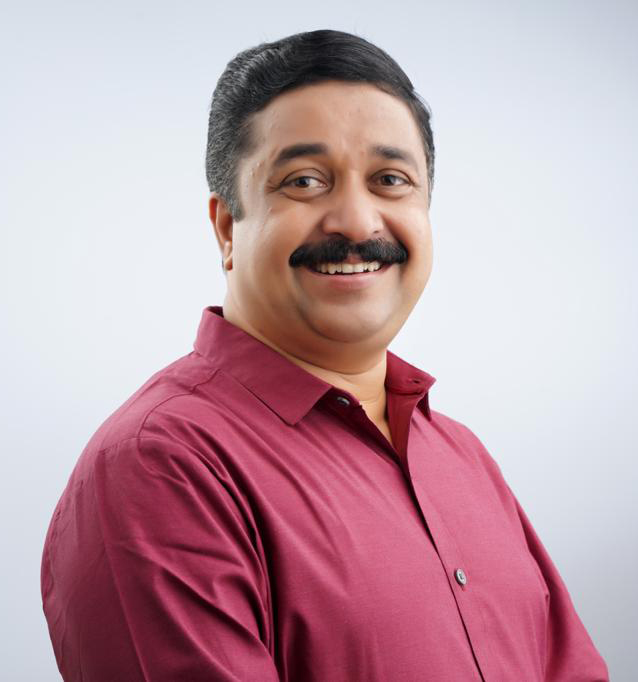
- Incumbent Najeeb Kanthapuram
- Party: IUML
- Alliance: UDF
- Elected year: 2026

Perinthalmanna State assembly constituency is one of the 140 state legislative assembly constituencies in Kerala in southern India. It is also one of the seven state legislative assembly constituencies included in Malappuram Lok Sabha constituency. As of the 2026 Assembly elections, the current MLA is Najeeb Kanthapuram of IUML.

== Local self-governed segments ==
Perinthalmanna Assembly constituency is composed of the following local self-governed segments:

Sl no.	Name	Status (Grama panchayat/Municipality)	Taluk
1	Perinthalmanna	Municipality	Perinthalmanna
2	Melattur	Grama panchayat	Perinthalmanna
3	Vettathur	Grama panchayat	Perinthalmanna
4	Thazhekode	Grama panchayat	Perinthalmanna
5	Aliparamba	Grama panchayat	Perinthalmanna
6	Pulamanthole	Grama panchayat	Perinthalmanna
7	Elamkulam	Grama panchayat	Perinthalmanna

Perinthalmanna Assembly constituency

Pulamanthole, one of the grama panchayats in the constituency, is associated with the traditional Ashtavaidya Ayurveda heritage of Kerala.

== Members of Legislative Assembly ==
The following list contains all members of Kerala Legislative Assembly who have represented Perinthalmanna Assembly constituency during the period of various assemblies:

Election	Niyama Sabha	Name	Party	Tenure
1957	1st	P. Govindan Nambiar	Communist Party of India	1957 – 1960
1960	2nd	E. P. Gopalan	Communist Party of India	1960 – 1965
1967	3rd	Paloli Mohammed Kutty	Communist Party of India	1967 – 1970
1970	4th	K. K. S. Thangal	Indian Union Muslim League	1970 – 1977
1977	5th	K. K. S. Thangal	Indian Union Muslim League	1977 – 1980
1980	6th	Nalakath Soopy	Indian Union Muslim League	1980 – 1982
1982	7th	Nalakath Soopy	Indian Union Muslim League	1982 – 1984
1987	8th	Nalakath Soopy	Indian Union Muslim League	1987 – 1991
1991	9th	Nalakath Soopy	Indian Union Muslim League	1991 – 1996
1996	10th	Nalakath Soopy	Indian Union Muslim League	1996 – 2001
2001	11th	Nalakath Soopy	Indian Union Muslim League	2001 – 2006
2006	12th	V. Sasikumar	Communist Party of India	2006 – 2011
2011	13th	Manjalamkuzhi Ali	Indian Union Muslim League	2011 – 2016
2016	14th	Manjalamkuzhi Ali	Indian Union Muslim League	2016 - 2021
2021	15th	Najeeb Kanthapuram	Indian Union Muslim League	2021-2026
2026	16th	Najeeb Kanthapuram	Indian Union Muslim League	2026-

== Election results ==
Percentage change (±%) denotes the change in the number of votes from the immediate previous election.

=== 2026 ===
2026 Kerala Legislative Assembly election: Perinthalmanna
Party	Candidate	Votes	%	±%
IUML	Najeeb Kanthapuram	104,888	56.36	▲10.15
CPI(M)	V. P. Mohammed Haneefa	72,457	38.94	▼7.25
BJP	Adv. K. P. Baburaj	7,240	3.89	▼0.95
NOTA	None of the above	664	0.36	▼0.16
Independent	Abdul Najeeb s/o Mohamed	239	0.13	–
Independent	Mohammed Haneefa P s/o Alavi	228	0.12	–
Independent	Haneefa	205	0.11	–
Independent	Najeeb	113	0.06	–
Independent	Abdul Najeeb s/o Veerappu	54	0.03	–
Margin of victory		32,431	17.42	–
Turnout		1,86,088	–	–
IUML hold		Swing	▲10.15	

2026 Kerala Legislative Assembly election: Perinthalmanna detailed result

Candidate	Party	Votes		Total	%
Candidate	Party	EVM	Postal	Total	%
Najeeb Kanthapuram	Indian Union Muslim League	103,916	972	104,888	56.36
V. P. Mohammed Haneefa	Communist Party of India (Marxist)	71,658	799	72,457	38.94
Adv. K. P. Baburaj	Bharatiya Janata Party	7,130	110	7,240	3.89
Abdul Najeeb s/o Mohamed	Independent	236	3	239	0.13
Mohammed Haneefa P s/o Alavi	Independent	227	1	228	0.12
Haneefa	Independent	203	2	205	0.11
Najeeb	Independent	112	1	113	0.06
Abdul Najeeb s/o Veerappu	Independent	54	0	54	0.03
NOTA	None of the Above	655	9	664	0.36
Total		184,191	1,897	186,088	100.00

=== 2021 ===
There were 2,17,959 registered voters in the constituency for the 2021 Kerala Assembly election.

2021 Kerala Legislative Assembly election: Perinthalmanna
Party	Candidate	Votes	%	±%
IUML	Najeeb Kanthapuram	76,530	46.21%	▼0.68
LDF	K. P. M. Musthafa	76,492	46.19%	▼0.31
BJP	Suchitra Mattada	8,021	4.84%	▲0.93
Independent	Adv. Abdul Afsal. P. T	906	0.55%	N/A
NOTA	None of the above	867	0.52%	▲0.19
Independent	Najeeb Kutteeri	828	0.50%	N/A
Independent	Muhammad Musthafa. K. P	751	0.45%	N/A
Independent	Musthafa. P. K	750	0.45%	N/A
Independent	Musthafa S/O Muhammad	471	0.28%	N/A
Margin of victory		38	0.02%	▼0.37
Turnout		1,65,616	75.98%	▼1.68
IUML hold		Swing	▼0.68	

=== 2016 ===
There were 1,94,976 registered voters in Perinthalmanna Assembly constituency for the 2016 Kerala Assembly election.

2016 Kerala Legislative Assembly election: Perinthalmanna
Party	Candidate	Votes	%	±%
IUML	Manjalamkuzhi Ali	70,990	46.89%	▼5.25
CPI(M)	V. Sasikumar	70,411	46.50%	▲1.53
BJP	Adv. M. K. Sunil	5,917	3.91%	▲2.42
WPOI	Saleem Mampad	1,757	1.16%	N/A
SDPI	Suniya Siraj	698	0.46%	▼0.34
Independent	Palathingal Aboobacker	671	0.44%	N/A
NOTA	None of the above	507	0.33%	N/A
PDP	Sayyid Musthafa Pookoya Thangal	335	0.22%	N/A
Independent	Anwar Shakeel Omar	125	0.08%	N/A
Margin of victory		579	0.39%	▼6.78
Turnout		1,51,411	77.66%	▼3.37
IUML hold		Swing	▼5.25	

=== 2011 ===
There were 1,65,042 registered voters in Perinthalmanna Assembly constituency for the 2011 Kerala Assembly election.

2011 Kerala Legislative Assembly election: Perinthalmanna
Party	Candidate	Votes	%	±%
IUML	Manjalamkuzhi Ali	69,730	52.14%	
CPI(M)	V. Sasikumar	60,141	44.97%	
BJP	C. K. Kunhimuhammed	1,989	1.49%	
SDPI	Saidalikkutty	1,067	0.80%	
Independent	Mohammed Ali	808	0.60%	
Margin of victory		9,589	7.17%	
Turnout		1,33,735	81.03%	
IUML gain from CPI(M)		Swing		

== See also ==
- Perinthalmanna
- Malappuram district
- List of constituencies of the Kerala Legislative Assembly
- 2016 Kerala Legislative Assembly election
