= Kumaramputhur (disambiguation) =

Kumaramputhur may refer to

- Kumaramputhur, a village in the Kumaramputhur (gram panchayat), Palakkad district, state of Kerala, India.

- Kumaramputhur (gram panchayat), a gram panchayat that serves the above village and others.
