= Valapuram =

- Town
- Location in Kerala, India Valapuram (India)
- Coordinates: 10.55°N 76.09°E
- Country: India
- State: Kerala
- District: Malappuram

Population (2011)
  - Total: 3,140

Languages
  - Official: Malayalam, English
- Time zone: UTC+5:30 (IST)
- Postal code: 679323
- Website: http://www.afxal.com

Valapuram is a small village which exists as a part of Kuruvambalam village. It is in Pulamanthole grama panchayath of Malappuram District, Kerala. It is situated on the banks of the Kunthipuzha River (also called Thoothappuzha). The river separates Malappuram and Palakkad districts. 41 people were martyred from Valapuram and Kuruvambalam regions in the Wagon Massacre, also known as the Wagon tragedy which was part of the Malabar rebellion of 1921.The nearest towns are Perinthalmanna(18 km), Valanchery (16 km), Pattambi (17 km), Pulamanthol (6 km), and Kulathur (5 km).

== GMUP School Valapuram ==
GMUPS (Government Mappila upper primary school). This is the old government school in Pulamanthol panchayath. This school was started in 1911. The Jubilee was celebrated in 2011. As of 2022, available classes are: LKG, 1 to 7.

== Culture ==
Valapuram village is a predominantly Muslim populated area. Hindus are represented in comparatively smaller numbers. So the culture of the locality is based upon Muslim traditions. Duff Muttu, Kolkali and Aravanamuttu are common folk arts of this locality. There are libraries attached to mosques giving a source of Islamic studies. Most of the books are written in Arabi-Malayalam which is a version of the Malayalam language written in Arabic script. People gather in mosques for the evening prayer and continue to sit there after the prayers discussing social and cultural issues. Business and family issues are also sorted out during these evening meetings. The Hindus of this area keep their rich traditions by celebrating various festivals in their temples. Hindu rituals are done here with a regular devotion as in other parts of Kerala.

== Transportation ==
Valapuram village connects to other parts of India through Perinthalmanna town. National highway No.66 passes through Tirur and the northern stretch connects to Goa and Mumbai. The southern stretch connects to Cochin and Trivandrum. Highway No.966 goes to Palakkad and Coimbatore. The nearest airport is at Kozhikode. The nearest major railway station is at Tirur.
