= Payyanadam =

- village
- Location in Kerala, India Payyanadam (India)
- Coordinates: 11.0108500°N 76.4457200°E
- Country: India
- State: Kerala
- District: Palakkad

Population (2011)
  - Total: 16,260

Languages
  - Official: Malayalam, English
- Time zone: UTC+5:30 (IST)
- PIN: 678583
- Telephone code: 04924XXXXXX
- Vehicle registration: KL-9 & 50
- Nearest city: Mannarkkad

Payyanadam is a village near Mannarkkad in Palakkad district in the Indian state of Kerala.

== Location ==
Payyanadam is situated on the right bank of the Kunthi River, at a distance of 3 km from NH 213.

== Demographics ==
As of 2011 India census, Payyanadam had a population of 16,260 with 7,708 males and 8,552 females.

== Administration ==
Administratively, Payyanadam falls under the Kumaramputhur gram panchayat.

== Festivals ==
- Ucharal vela at Sree Kurumba Bhagavathi temple
- Sivaratri at Enanimagalam siva temple
- Perunal at St. Joseph church
- SreeKrishna Jayanthi Procession from Enanimagalam siva temple to Sree
- Kurumba Bhagavathi temple
