= Puzhakkattiri =

Coordinates: 10°58′N 76°09′E

- Village
- Interactive map of Puzhakkattiri
- Country: India
- State: Kerala
- District: Malappuram
- Taluk: Perinthalmanna

Government
  - Type: Gram Panchayat
  - Body: Puzhakkattiri Grama Panchayat
- Time zone: UTC+5:30 (IST)
- PIN: 679321
- Vehicle registration: KL-10,KL-53
- State Assembly constituency: Mankada
- Lok Sabha constituency: Malappuram

Puzhakkattiri is a village in Malappuram district in the state of Kerala, India.

== Transportation ==
Puzhakkattiri village connects to other parts of India through NH966. It connects to Malappuram, Palakkad and Kozhikode district head quarters as well as other towns such as Perinthalmanna, Mannarkad, Kondotty etc. The nearest airport is at Kozhikode. The nearest major railway stations are at Tirur, Angadippuram and Pattambi.
