= Mannarkkad =

Mannarkkad Mannarghat
- Municipality
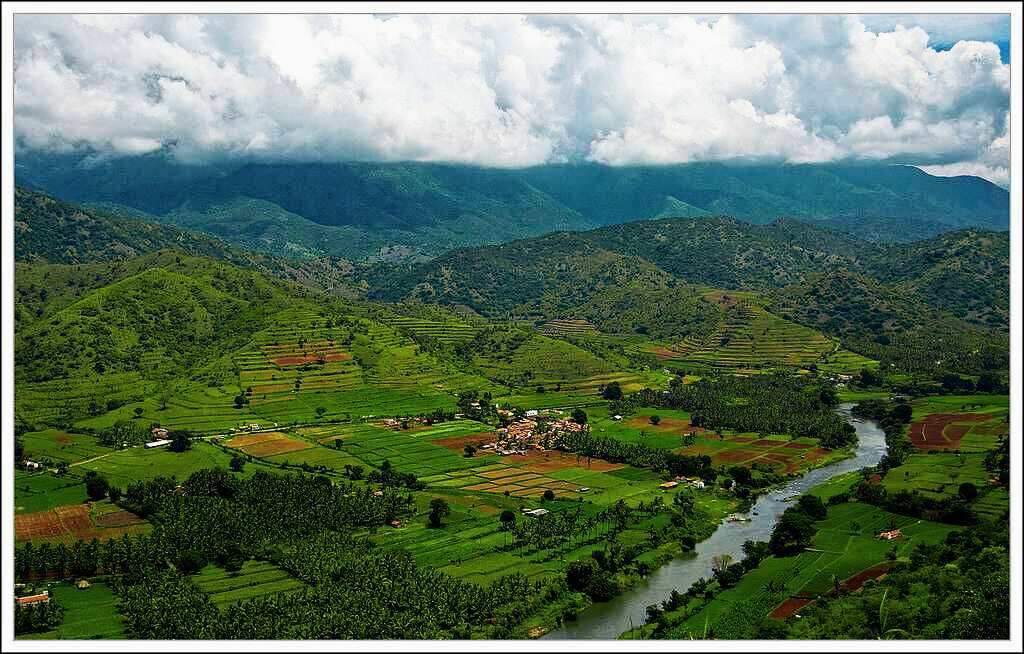
- Attapady hills
- Nickname: Gateway to Western Ghats
- Location in Kerala, India Mannarkkad (India)
- Coordinates: 10.9932°N 76.4610°E
- Country: India
- State: Kerala
- Region: South Malabar
- District: Palakkad

Government
  - Type: Municipal council
  - Body: Mannarkkad municipality
  - Municipal Chairperson: Sajna Teacher (IUML)
  - Vice Chairperson: K. Balakrishanan (INC)

Area
  - Total: 33.01 km^{2} (12.75 sq mi)
- Elevation: 76 m (249 ft)

Population (2011)
  - Total: 34,839
  - Density: 1,055/km^{2} (2,733/sq mi)
- Demonym: Mannarkkadans

Languages
  - Official: Malayalam, English
  - Speech: Malayalam, English
- Time zone: UTC+5:30 (IST)
- PIN: 678582
- Telephone code: + 91, STD (04924)
- Vehicle registration: KL-50
- Parliament constituency: Palakkad
- Assembly constituency: Mannarkkad
- Website: mannarkkadmunicipality.lsgkerala.gov.in/en

Mannarkkad, formerly known as Mannarghat, is a major municipal town in Palakkad district of the Indian state of Kerala. The Silent Valley National Park and the Attappadi Reserve Forest are located in Mannarkkad Taluk. Mannarkkad is situated 36 km away from district headquarters Palakkad on National Highway 966. It is the traditional seat of the Mannarghat Moopil Nair.

== History ==
Mannarkkad and Attappadi were parts of Valluvanad Swaroopam dynasty in medieval period with their headquarters at Angadipuram near Perinthalmanna in present-day Malappuram district. According to local legends, the last Cheraman Perumal ruler gave a vast extension of land in South Malabar during his journey to Mecca to one of their governors, Valluvakonathiri, and left for pilgrimage.

During the last decades of the eighteenth century, the region came under the control of the vast Kingdom of Mysore. Under British Raj, it was a part of Valluvanad Taluk of Malappuram Revenue Division in Malabar District. Mannarkkad, along with the towns of Perinthalmanna, Malappuram, Manjeri, Pandikkad, and Tirurangadi, was one of the main centres of the Malabar Rebellion of 1921.

Walluvanad Taluk was divided into six Revenue blocks: Mankada, Perinthalmanna, Mannarkkad, Ottapalam, Sreekrishnapuram, and Pattambi. On 1 January 1957, Palakkad district was formed consisting of 6 taluks. Mannarkad was part of Perinthalmanna taluk which was part of Palakkad district until the formation of Malappuram district. During the formation of Malappuram district on 16 June 1969, the Revenue blocks of Mannarkkad and Attappadi were separated from Perinthalmanna Taluk and Mannarkkad became an independent taluk.

Later some years, a portion of Karuvarakundu village in Eranad Taluk (now Karuvarakundu is a part of Nilambur Taluk) of Malappuram district was transferred to the Silent Valley area of Mannarkkad Taluk. In 2021 Attapady was separated from Mannarkad taluk and became independent taluk with taluk headquarters at Agali.

== Geography ==
Mannarkkad is located at 10.98°N 76.47°E. It has an average elevation of 76 m (249 ft). Mannarkkad is located 36 km north-west of district headquarters Palakkad, along National Highway 966 and 100 km north west of Kozhikode. Mannarkkad is located in the foothills of the Western Ghats.

== Silent Valley National Park ==
It is located in the rich biodiversity of Nilgiri Biosphere Reserve. Karimpuzha Wildlife Sanctuary, New Amarambalam Reserved Forest, and Nedumkayam Rainforest in Nilambur Taluk of Malappuram district, Attappadi Reserved Forest in Mannarkkad Taluk of Palakkad district, and Mukurthi National Park of Nilgiris district, are located around Silent Valley National Park. Mukurthi peak, the fifth-highest peak in South India, and Anginda peak are also located in its vicinity. Bhavani River, a tributary of Kaveri River, and Kunthipuzha River, a tributary of Bharathappuzha river, originate in the vicinity of Silent Valley. The Kadalundi River has also its origin in Silent Valley.

== Civic Administration ==
=== Mannarkkad Municipality Election 2020 ===
S.No.	Party name	Party symbol	Number of Councillors
01	UDF		13
02	Independents		0
03	BJP		03
04	LDF		13

== Mannarkkad Taluk ==
Mannarkkad is one of the six Taluks of Palakkad district.

== See also ==
- Kanjirappuzha
- Attappady
