= Edappatta =

- village
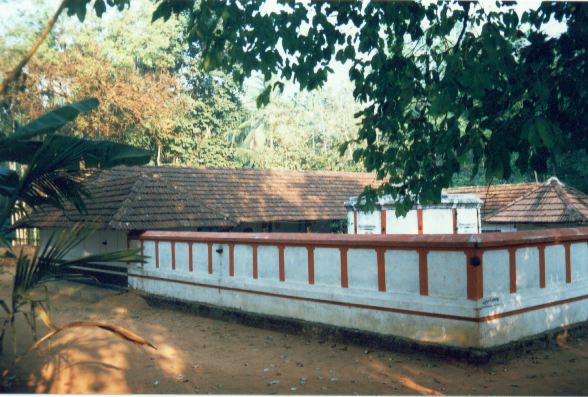
- Kattuputhoor Shiva Temple, Edappatta

- Location in Kerala, India Edappatta (India)
- Coordinates: 11°4′0″N 76°17′0″E
- Country: India
- State: Kerala
- District: Malappuram

Government
  - Type: Gram panchayat
  - Body: Edappatta Grama Panchayat

Area
  - Total: 25.77 km^{2} (9.95 sq mi)

Population (2011)
  - Total: 22,729
  - Density: 656/km^{2} (1,700/sq mi)

Languages
  - Official: Malayalam, English
- Time zone: UTC+5:30 (IST)
- PIN: 679326
- Telephone code: 04933
- Vehicle registration: KL-10
- Nearest city: Melattur
- Sex ratio: 1054 ♂/♀
- Literacy: 84%
- Lok Sabha constituency: Malappuram
- Niyama Sabha constituency: Manjeri

Edappatta is a village in Malappuram district in the state of Kerala, India . Edappatta is a panchayath in Malappuram district sharing borders with palakkad district, Melattur panchayath Karuvarakundu pancahayth and Tuvvur panchayath.

== Location ==
Edappatta is located between Nilambur and Perinthalmanna in the Malappuram District. The nearest airport is Calicut Airport, which is about 50 km away. The nearest railway station is Melattur, at about 3 km.

== Demographics ==
As of 2011 India census, Edappatta had a population of 22729 with 10710 males and 12019 females.

== Important Landmarks ==
- Friends Club Cheripparambu
- Darul Uloom Madhrassa
- Veliyanchery Highschool
- St.Mary's Church, Pathirikode
- Olipuzha River

== Major Places ==
- MOONADI
- Veliyanchery
- Olappara
- Kizhakkumpadam
- Pullikkuth
- Pathirikode
- Edappatta Central
- Edappatta Puzhakkal Kund
- Eppikkadu
- Angilangadi
- Cheripparambu

== Transportation ==
Edappatta village connects to other parts of India through Perinthalmanna town. National highway No.66 passes through Tirur and the northern stretch connects to Goa and Mumbai. The southern stretch connects to Cochin and Trivandrum. Highway No.966 goes to Palakkad and Coimbatore. The nearest airport is at Kozhikode. The nearest major railway station is at Tirur.
