= Kuruvambalam =

Kuruvambalam padi, korangadu, NK kulamba, pallippadi, thazhethathil padi
- village
- Location in Kerala, India Kuruvambalam (India)
- Coordinates: 10°56′15″N 76°9′50″E
- Country: India
- State: Kerala
- District: Malappuram

Area
  - Total: 10.28 km^{2} (3.97 sq mi)

Population (2011)
  - Total: 10,756
  - Density: 1,046/km^{2} (2,710/sq mi)

Languages
  - Official: Malayalam, English
- Time zone: UTC+5:30 (IST)
- PIN: 679338
- Vehicle registration: KL-10, KL-53

Kuruvambalam is a village within the Perinthalmanna Taluk of Malappuram district in the state of Kerala, India.

== Demographics ==
As of 2001 India census, Kuruvambalam had a population of 9769 with 4550 males and 5219 females. For administrative purposes, the village of Valapuram immediately south is included within the Revenue Village of Kuruvambalam. At the 2011 census, the population had increased to 10,756.

== Transportation ==
Kuruvambalam village connects to other parts of India through Perinthalmanna town. National highway No.66 passes through Tirur and the northern stretch connects to Goa and Mumbai. The southern stretch connects to Cochin and Trivandrum. Highway No.966 goes to Palakkad and Coimbatore. The nearest airport is at Kozhikode. The nearest major railway station is at Tirur.
