= Arakkuparamba =

- village
- Location in Kerala, India Arakkuparamba (India)
- Coordinates: 10.982881°N 76.325460°E
- Country: India
- State: Kerala
- District: Malappuram

Population (2011)
  - Total: 18,098

Languages
  - Official: Malayalam, English
- Time zone: UTC+5:30 (IST)
- PIN: 6XXXXX
- Vehicle registration: KL-

Arakkuparamba is a village in Malappuram district in the state of Kerala, India.

Arakkuparamba was once famous for mining iron ore. Iron ore mined from Arakkuparamba was converted into iron plates and rods at neighbouring Aliparamba. Ore melting technology was known to the ancient inhabitants. Ayirumada (or iron ore mining places) can still be seen there.

Arakkuparamba was under the control of Chera Kings and was under the Nedunganad Principality. The Samoothiri of Calicut defeated Nedungadis of Nedunganad and brought this place under their control.

Remnants of ancient temples are seen at different places. With the help of local people, these temples are being renovated.

== Demographics ==
At the 2011 India census, Arakkuparamba had a population of 18,098 (8,625 males and 9,473 females).

== Culture ==
Arakkuparamba village is having cultural and importance from "Pandava" age. It connect to Arakkillam. In early ages there are 42 landlord families were there and after the Arakkillam fire left 2 families Karuthedam and Moothedam. Many people migrated from Travancore and few families migrated from Northern Malabar to this area in the recent past.

== Transportation ==
Arakkuparamba village connects to other parts of India through Perinthalmanna town. National highway No.66 passes through Kottakkal and the northern stretch connects to Goa and Mumbai. The southern stretch connects to Cochin and Trivandrum. Highway No.213 goes to Palakkad and Kozhikode. The nearest airport is at Karipur. The nearest major railway station is at Angadippuram.
