= Nedungadi =

Surname

Nedungadi is a Samanthan titular suffix, originating in the Indian state of Kerala. Nedungadi belong to Samanthan section of the Malabar ruling class of Nairs.

Samanthans were the erstwhile rulers of small Nadus (Places) under the Chera Dynasty. The name Nedungadi is believed to be derived from the word "Nedunganadu" and the word "aadi", meaning "ancient/going back a long way". "Nedunganadu" used to be a small region that now includes Shornur, Ottappalam, Kothakursi, Pattambi, Kootanad, Naduvattam, Karalmanna Cherpulasserry, Karimpuza, Nellaya, Vallapuzha are the old seats of Eralpad Raja, the second Sthani of Zamorin. The Zamorin obtained rights to rule this place after defeating Nedungadies. The places ruled by the Nedungadies at an earlier time are mainly in Palghat District and also include Aliparamba, Thootha, Anamangad, Arakkuparamba, Eravimangalam, Nattukal, Valamkulam, Amminikkad in Malappuram District of Kerala. In all these places, there are still Samanathan Nair families with "Nedungadi" in their names.

In medieval times, Nedunganadu was a small territorial unit within the Chera kingdom. The place was also known as Parambu Nadu in old writings. Parambu Nadu is seen as the territory ruled by Velir chief famous Vel Pari. Later on divided and ruled by Chola, Chera and Pandya Kings and other Velir chiefs with their fighting heads. In Purananooru of Sangham texts, Tirukoilur, surrounding present Dharmapuri is mentioned as Nedunadu, the land lies between the eastern and western seas. The name for the place Cherpulassery came from Chera Pulla Cherry. The place were the sons of Cheras lived. The nearby place is Kotha Kursi. Kotha was the pet name for Cherans. The name Shornur is derived from the old name Cheran vanna oor (places ruled by Chera Kings) later on corrupted to Cheruvannor and to the present day Shornur. A place with a railway junction connecting railway lines to Trivandrum, Chennai, Mangalore and Nilambur. The original family name of the rulers is unknown, but the members of the royal families are referred to as "the Nedungadis" in the later documents of the Samutiris of Kozhikode who conquered and ruled this territory.

Nedungadi is the term generally used to describe the men of the caste, and the women are known by the title Kovilamma / Kovilpad meaning Princesses of the Royal House (Kovilakam).

In addition, one of the authors of "Kundalatha," one of the first Malayalam novels, was from this family: T.M. Appu Nedungadi. The first scholar who did research on the evolution of the Malayalam language was one Kovunni Nedungadi belonging to this community. Nedungadi contributed to CV Raman's optics research.

Nedungadi Bank was also a famous bank in India until 2003, when it was bought by Punjab National Bank.
