= Mankada =

- Village
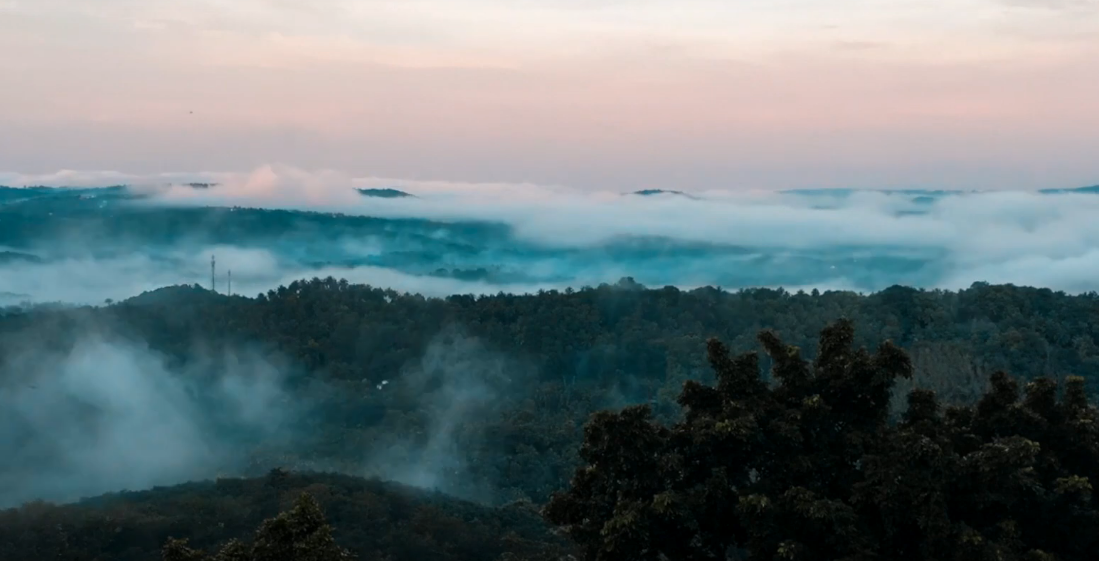
- Cheriyam hill viewpoint in Mankada

- Location in Kerala, India Mankada (India)
- Coordinates: 11.018658°N 76.175530°E
- Country: India
- State: Kerala
- District: Malappuram

Government
  - Type: Grama Panchayat
  - Body: Mankada Grama Panchayat
  - President: Adv. Asgarali
  - Vice president: P. Saleena Ummer

Area
  - Total: 31.06 km^{2} (11.99 sq mi)

Population (2011)
  - Total: 32,748
  - Density: 1,054/km^{2} (2,730/sq mi)

Languages
  - Official: Malayalam

Human Development
  - Sex ratio (2011): 1099 ♀/1000♂
  - Literacy (2011): 95.66%
- Time zone: UTC+5:30 (IST)
- PIN: 679324
- Telephone code: 04933
- Vehicle registration: KL-53
- Climate: Tropical monsoon (Köppen)
- Avg. summer temperature: 35 °C (95 °F)
- Avg. winter temperature: 20 °C (68 °F)
- Nearest towns: Perinthalmanna; Manjeri; Malappuram
- Niyamasabha constituency: Mankada
- Block Panchayat: Mankada
- Website: www.lsgkerala.in/mankadapanchayat

Mankada is a hillside village in the Malappuram district of Kerala state. It is located 15 km (9.3 mi) from Malappuram and is part of the Malappuram parliament constituency. The municipal town of Perinthalmanna is just 10 km (6.2 mi) away. Also, the municipal towns of Manjeri and Malappuram are just 15 km (9.3 mi) away. Mankada Kadannamanna Kovilakam was the seat of ruling family of the erstwhile Kingdom of Valluvanad.

== Geography ==
The Mankada Gram Panchayat is bordered the Cheriyam hills and other three major towns in Malappuram district, Malappuram, Manjeri and Perintalmanna. The total area of Mankada Panchayath is 31.33 km^{2} (12.10 sq mi). Most of the land is arable. Climate is very cool in the rainy season and usually dry in the summer season just like the other part of Kerala. The rainy season is from June to November, winter season from December to January and the rest of the year is sunny. The temperature is normal and ranges from 25 degree 35 degree. The terrain consists of small hills and upland plain. There is not many natural resources and most of the arable land is cultivated with permanent crops. Also, there are no major environmental issues or natural hazards.

== History ==
Mankada was originally part of the Valluvanad Swaroopam dynasty in the early medieval period (12th century CE). Kadannamanna Kovilakam at Mankada was their seat of power. Valluvanad was an erstwhile princely state in the present state of Kerala, that extended from the Bharathappuzha river in the South to the Panthaloor Mala in the North. On the west, it was bounded by the Arabian Sea at Ponnani and on the east by the Attappadi Hills during their zenith in the early Middle Ages. The capital of erstwhile Valluvanad was at the present-day town of Angadipuram. Valluvanad was ruled by a Samanthan Nair clan known as Vellodis, similar to the Eradis of neighbouring Eranad and Nedungadis of Nedunganad. The rulers of Valluvanad were known by the title Valluvakonathiri/Vellattiri. According to local legends, the last Cheraman Perumal ruler gave a vast extension of land in South Malabar during his journey to Mecca to one of their governors, Valluvakonathiri, and left for pilgrimage. Valluvanad was famous for the Mamankam festivals, held once in 12 years and the endless wars against the Samoothiri of Kozhikode.

== People ==
As of the 2011 census, the total population of the Panchayat is 32,748. The population density is 1,054 inhabitants per square kilometre (2,730/sq mi) which is around the state average. The sex ratio is almost normal. The people are highly literate. The literacy rate is 95.66 percent. Malayalam is the most-spoken as well as the administrative language. Cinematographer and director Mankada Ravi Varma was born here.

== Economy ==
The economy encompasses traditional village farming, small scale business, and foreign money. A good percentage of natives are working in the Middle Eastern Countries. The local economy is currently undergoing a construction boom and which is solely dependent on the gulf money. The main crops that are cultivated are coconut, arecacnut, paddy, and banana. Two gold load zones of highly potential sulphide rich high grade rocks have been found in recent explorations in mankada. The govt may head for the mining, if it can address the environmental issues.

== Administration and other facilities ==
The panchayath is divided into 18 wards. The village receives development funds through panchayath allocations and the assembly and parliament allocations. The road network and potable water are available to a good number of people. The panchayath has one Government Allopathic hospital, one Government-run Ayurvedic hospital and a few clinics. Other public amenities include four banks including State Bank of India, Federal Bank, Co-operative banks, one post office, public library, police station, and a stadium.

== Transportation ==
Mankada village connects to other parts of India through Perinthalmanna town. National Highway No.66 passes through valanchery and the northern stretch connects to Goa and Mumbai. The southern stretch connects to Cochin and Trivandrum. Aripra is 1.7 kilometres (1.1 mi) to the south. Highway No.966 goes to Palakkad and Coimbatore. The nearest airport is at Kozhikode. The nearest major railway station is at [(Angadippuram)], Tirur, and Shoranur Junction.

== Education ==
Though the literacy rate is high, most of the literacy rate was attained through the literacy drive of Kerala Literacy Mission. The panchayath has good number of primary and upper primary schools. The main educational institute is the A.m.u.p school Koottil, Government Higher secondary school Mankada, Government High School Cheriyam Mankada, Al Ameen English medium School Mankada, and NCT English medium school Verumpilakkal which has thousands of students.

== Places of Interest ==
- Cheriyam hill viewpoint
- Chekuthan paara viewpoint

== Notable people ==
- Mankada Ravi Varma

== See also ==
- Mankada (State Assembly constituency)
