= Kumaramputhur Gram Panchayat =

Kumaramputhur is a gram panchayat in the Palakkad district, state of Kerala, India. It is a local government organisation that serves the villages of Kumaramputhur and Payyanadam.

Kumaramputhur Panchayath is situated in the banks of Kunthi River. Calicut to Palakkad National Highway 966 is passing through this village. The village is situated in Panoramic view of river and paddy fields. A town near to kumaramputhur is Mannarkkad .
