= Keezhattur =

- village
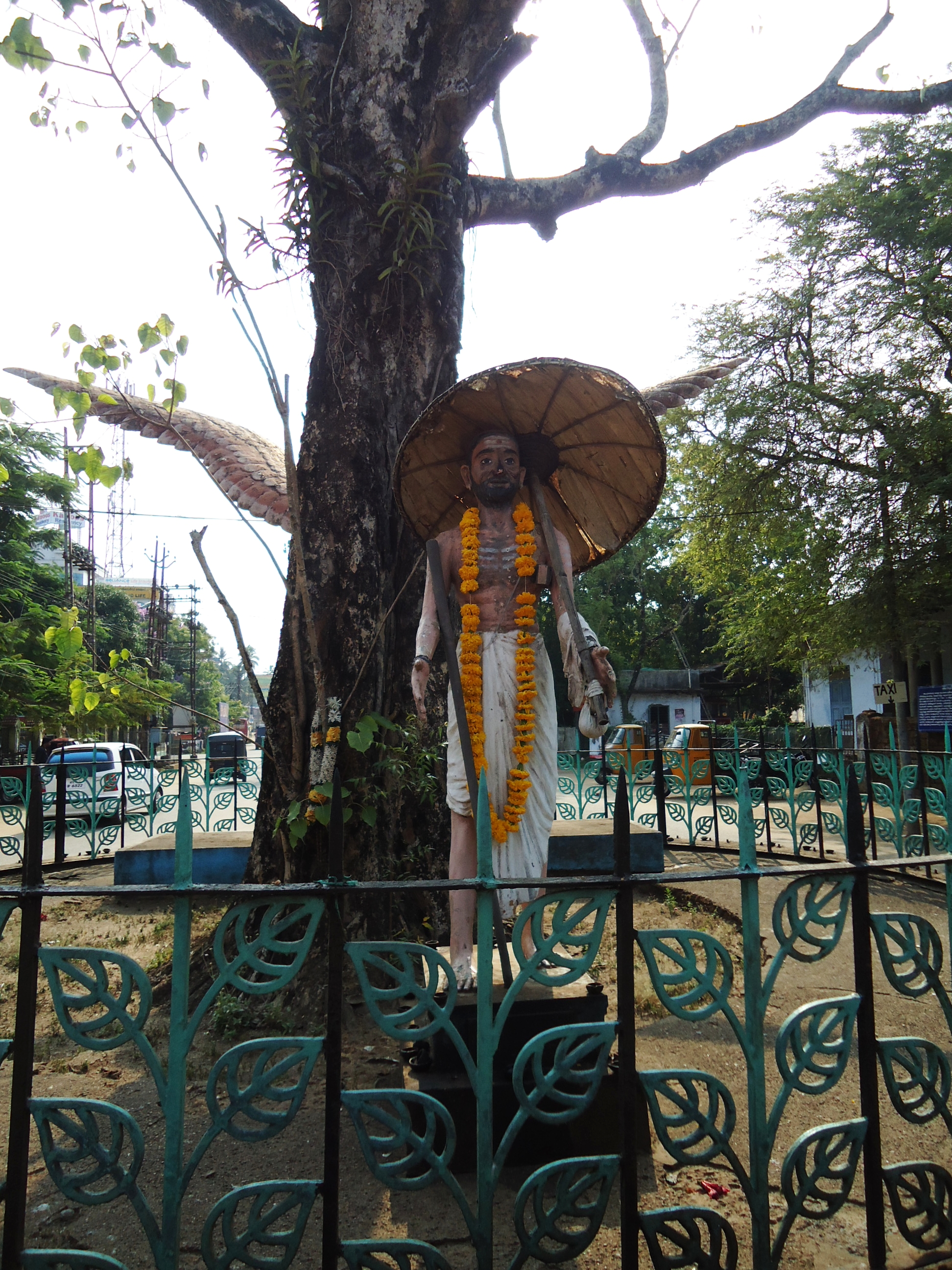
- Keezhattur is the birthplace of Poonthanam Namboothiri

- Keezhattur, Malappuram district, Kerala, India
- Coordinates: 11.0565°N 76.2508°E
- Country: India
- State: Kerala
- District: Malappuram

Government
  - Type: Gram panchayat
  - Body: Keezhattur Grama Panchayat
  - Panchayat President: P.K. Moosakkutty (IUML)
- Elevation: 74.3 m (244 ft)

Population (2011)
  - Total: 20,457

Languages
  - Official: Malayalam, English
  - Speech: Malayalam, English
- Time zone: UTC+5:30 (IST)
- PIN: 679325
- Block Panchayat Division: 2- Keezhattur Division; Perinthalmanna Block Panchayat
- District Panchayat Division: 8-Anakkayam Division; Malappuram District Panchayat
- Niyama Sabha constituency: Manjeri
- Lok Sabha constituency: Malappuram
- Website: keezhatturpanchayat.lsgkerala.gov.in/ml

Keezhattur is a village in Malappuram district in the state of Kerala, India. Poonthanam illam, the birthplace of "bhakthakavi" Poonthanam namboothiri, famous ancient Malayalam poet, is located here. The poonthanam illam is now a popular cultural centre. Keezhattur is a moderately large panchayat.The major place in keezhattur panchayat is kizhattur.'kizhattur pooram' is the major festival in keezhattur. Its administrative offices are located in Akkaparambu, which is about 12 km away from Perinthalmanna.

== Demographics ==
As of 2011 India census, Keezhattur had a population of 20,457 with 9,787 males and 10,670 females.

== Transportation ==
Keezhattoor village connects to other parts of India through Perinthalmanna town. National highway No.66 passes through Tirur and the northern stretch connects to Goa and Mumbai. The southern stretch connects to Cochin and Trivandrum. Highway No.966 goes to Palakkad and Coimbatore. The nearest airport is at Kozhikode. The nearest railway station is at Pattikkad.
