= Thazhekkod, Malappuram district =

Thazhekode
- Village
- Nickname: TKD
- Location in Kerala, India Thazhekode (India)
- Coordinates: 10°57′0″N 76°17′0″E
- Country: India
- State: Kerala
- District: Malappuram
- Taluk: Perinthalmanna

Government
  - Type: Grama Panchayath
  - Body: Thazhekkode Grama Panchayat
  - Panchayat President: Hussain Kalappadan (IUML)
  - Vice President: Divya

Population (2011)
  - Total: 23,884

Languages
  - Official: Malayalam, English
- Time zone: UTC+5:30 (IST)
- PIN: 679341, 679322
- Vehicle registration: KL-53
- Niyama Sabha constituency: Perinthalmanna
- Block division: 8 - Thazhekode Division; Perinthalmanna Block Panchayat
- Nearest town: Perinthalmanna (10km)
- Website: thazhekkodepanchayat.lsgkerala.gov.in

Thazhekode is a village and a gram panchayat in Malappuram district in the state of Kerala, India.

== Demographics ==
As of 2011 India census, Thazhekode had a population of 23884 with 11429 males and 12455 females.

== History ==
Thazekode was once the control of Nedungadies, the Nedunganad Rajas under Chera Kings. Later on captured by Valluvanad Rajas and Zamorin Rajas respectively. This place is situated at the foothill of Amminikadan Mala (mountain). The National High Way No. 966 is passing through it.

== Thazhekode ==
Thazhekode. The place was famous for rice, hill produce, and forest products. Muslim families like Cholamugath, Ponneth, Nellaya and Nalakath are known for their wisdom and rich contributions for development of the place. Thazhekkode is the birth Place of former Education Minister Sri . Nalakath Sooppy and Adv. Cholamugath Koya, who was elected to Kerala Assembly in 1965 (which was dispersed by the President of India, since there was no majority for a party/alliance).

== Valaamkurishi ==
The western portion of Thazhekode is known as Valaamkurisi, connected to the name of Valluvanad Rajas. Most of the landed property was in the holding of Pallasseri Moothamans, a title adorned by a branch of Nedungadies. After defeat of Valluvand, Zamoorin raja gave the control of this place to his chief Kotharayans, the second sthani of Kuthiravattathu Thampans.

== Transportation ==
Thazhekkod village connects to other parts of India through Perinthalmanna and Mannarkkad towns. National highway No.966 passes through Tirur and the northern stretch connects to Goa and Mumbai. The southern stretch connects to Cochin and Trivandrum. Highway No.966 goes to Palakkad and Coimbatore. The nearest airport is at Kozhikode. The nearest major railway station is at [Shoranur]. Angadippuram railway station is 12 km away from Thazhekode.
