= Elamkulam, Malappuram =

Elamkulam
- Village
- Mini Civil Station, Elamkulam

- Location in Kerala, India Elamkulam (India)
- Coordinates: 10°54′0″N 76°13′0″E
- Country: India
- State: Kerala
- District: Malappuram
- Taluk: Perinthalmanna
- Block: Perinthalmanna Block Panchayat

Government
  - Type: Gram Panchayat
  - Body: Elamkulam Grama Panchayat
  - Panchayat President: Shaheena Teacher (IUML)
  - Vice President: -

Languages
  - Official: Malayalam, English
- Time zone: UTC+5:30 (IST)
- Postal code: 679340
- Telephone code: 0493
- Vehicle registration: KL-53
- Lok Sabha constituency: Malappuram
- Niyama Sabha constituency: Perinthalmanna
- Website: elamkulampanchayat.lsgkerala.gov.in

Elamkulam is a village in Perinthalmanna taluk of Malappuram district in Kerala state.

== Geography ==
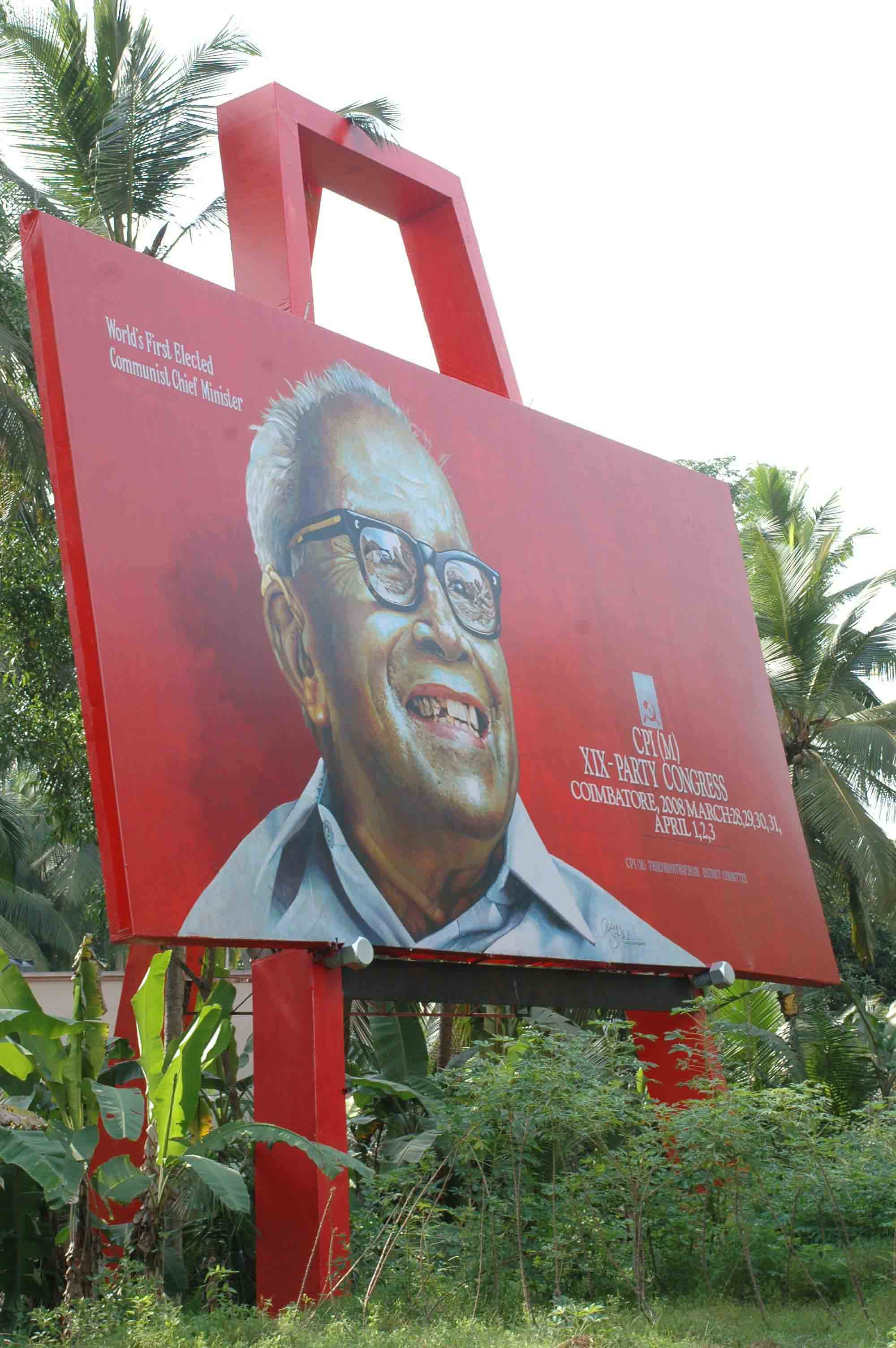
Communist leader EMS was from Elamkulam

It is located at 10°54′0″N 76°13′0″E.

== Prominent People ==
Elamkulam is the birthplace of the famous Indian communist leader late E. M. S. Namboodiripad.

== Transportation ==
Elamkulam village connects to other parts of India through Perinthalmanna town. National highway No. 66 passes through Tirur and the northern stretch connects to Goa and Mumbai. The southern stretch connects to Cochin and Trivandrum. Highway No. 966 goes to Palakkad and Coimbatore. The nearest airport is at Kozhikode. The nearest railway station is at Cherukara.
