= Anamangad =

- village
- Location in Kerala, India Anamangad (India)
- Coordinates: 10.9361500°N 76.2639700°E
- Country: India
- State: Kerala
- District: Malappuram
- Block Panchayat: Perinthalmanna
- Gram panchayat: Aliparamba

Population (2011)
  - Total: 16,866

Languages
  - Official: Malayalam, English
- Time zone: UTC+5:30 (IST)
- PIN: 679357
- Vehicle registration: KL-53
- Nearest city: Perintalmanna
- Lok Sabha constituency: Malappuram
- Vidhan Sabha constituency: Perintalmanna

Anamangad is a village in Malappuram district in the state of Kerala, India.

== Demographics ==
As of 2011 India census, Anamangad had a population of 16,866 with 8,051 males and 8,815 females.

== Landmarks ==
A special centre which is an out campus of Aligarh Muslim University is located here.

== Transportation ==
Anamangad village connects to other parts of India through Perinthalmanna town. State Highway 53 passes through Anamangad which connects Cherpulassery and Perinthalmanna. National Highway 66 passes through Tirur and the northern stretch connects to Goa and Mumbai. The southern stretch connects to Cochin and Trivandrum. National Highway 966 passing through Perinthalmanna connects Kozhikode and Palakkad. The nearest airport is at Karipur which is 50 km from Anamangad. The nearest railway station is at Cherukara and Angadipuram.
