= Kumaramputhur =

- village
- Location in Kerala, India Kumaramputhur (India)
- Coordinates: 10°58′0″N 76°26′0″E
- Country: India
- State: Kerala
- District: Palakkad

Population (2011)
  - Total: 16,600

Languages
  - Official: Malayalam, English
- Time zone: UTC+5:30 (IST)
- PIN: 678583
- Vehicle registration: KL-50

Kumaramputhur is a village in Palakkad district in the state of Kerala, India. It is administered, along with some other villages, by the Kumaramputhur gram panchayat. Palakkad - Kozhikode National highway passes through Kumaramputhur.

== Demographics ==
As of 2011 India census, Kumaramputhur had a population of 16,600 with 8,003 males and 8,597 females.
