= Vettathur =

Vettathoor
- Village
- Vettathur
- Location in Kerala, India Vettathoor (India)
- Coordinates: 11°00′46″N 76°18′01″E
- Country: India
- State: Kerala
- District: Malappuram
- Taluk: Perinthalmanna

Government
  - Type: Gram Panchayat
  - Body: Vettathur Grama Panchayath
  - Panchayat President: Sulaikha Karimbana (IUML)
  - Vice President: Abdul Majeed K.P (INC)

Area
  - Total: 35.84 km^{2} (13.84 sq mi)

Population (2011)
  - Total: 13,040
  - Density: 363.8/km^{2} (942.3/sq mi)

Languages
  - Official: Malayalam, English
- Time zone: UTC+5:30 (IST)
- PIN: 679326, 679325
- Telephone code: +91
- Vehicle registration: KL-53
- Website: vettathurpanchayat.lsgkerala.gov.in

Vettathur is a village in Malappuram district in the state of Kerala, India.

== Demographics ==
As per the 2011 India census, Vettathur had a population of 13040. It is a grama panchayath in Malappuram and includes Vettathur and Karyavattam villages and the areas Kappu, Thelakkad, Melkulangara, Mannarmala and Shanthapuram.

== Transportation ==
Vettathur village connects to other parts of India through Perinthalmanna town. National highway No.66 passes through Tirur and the northern stretch connects to Goa and Mumbai. The southern stretch connects to Cochin and Trivandrum. Highway No.966 goes to Palakkad and Coimbatore. The nearest airport is at Kozhikode. The nearest major railway station is at Tirur.

== Near places ==
Kappu, Thelakkad, Melkulangara, Pacheeri paara, Moochikkal, Vengoor, karyvattom(ezhu thala)
