= Valambur =

Valambur Valamboor
- Town
- Location in Kerala, India Valambur (India)
- Coordinates: 11°0′0″N 76°12′0″E
- Country: India
- State: Kerala
- District: Malappuram

Population (2011)
  - Total: 29,201

Languages
  - Official: Malayalam, English
- Time zone: UTC+5:30 (IST)
- PIN: 6XXXXX
- Vehicle registration: KL-

Valambur is a town in Malappuram district in the state of Kerala, India.

== Demographics ==
As of 2011 India census, Valambur had a population of 29,201, with 13,901 males and 15,300 females.

== Transportation ==
Valambur town connects to other parts of India through Perinthalmanna town. National Highway No. 66 passes through Tirur, and the northern stretch connects to Goa and Mumbai. The southern stretch connects to Cochin and Trivandrum. Highway No. 966 leads to Palakkad and Coimbatore. The nearest airport is at Kozhikode, and the nearest major railway station is at Tirur.
