= Angadipuram =

Angadippuram
- Census town
- Angadippuram railway station

- Location in Kerala, India Angadippuram (India)
- Coordinates: 10.980°N 76.1941°E
- Country: India
- State: Kerala
- District: Malappuram
- Taluk: Perinthalmanna

Government
  - Type: Gram Panchayat
  - Body: Angadippuram Panchayat
  - President: Shabeer Kurumukkil (IUML)
  - Vice President: Mubeena Thasni (IUML)

Languages
  - Official: Malayalam, English
- Time zone: UTC+5:30 (IST)
- PIN: 679321
- Telephone code: 04933
- Vehicle registration: KL-53
- Nearest Town: Perinthalmanna
- Literacy: 91%
- State Assembly constituency: Mankada
- Lok Sabha constituency: Malappuram
- Block Panchayat: Perinthalmanna Block Panchayat
- Website: angadippurampanchayat.lsgkerala.gov.in

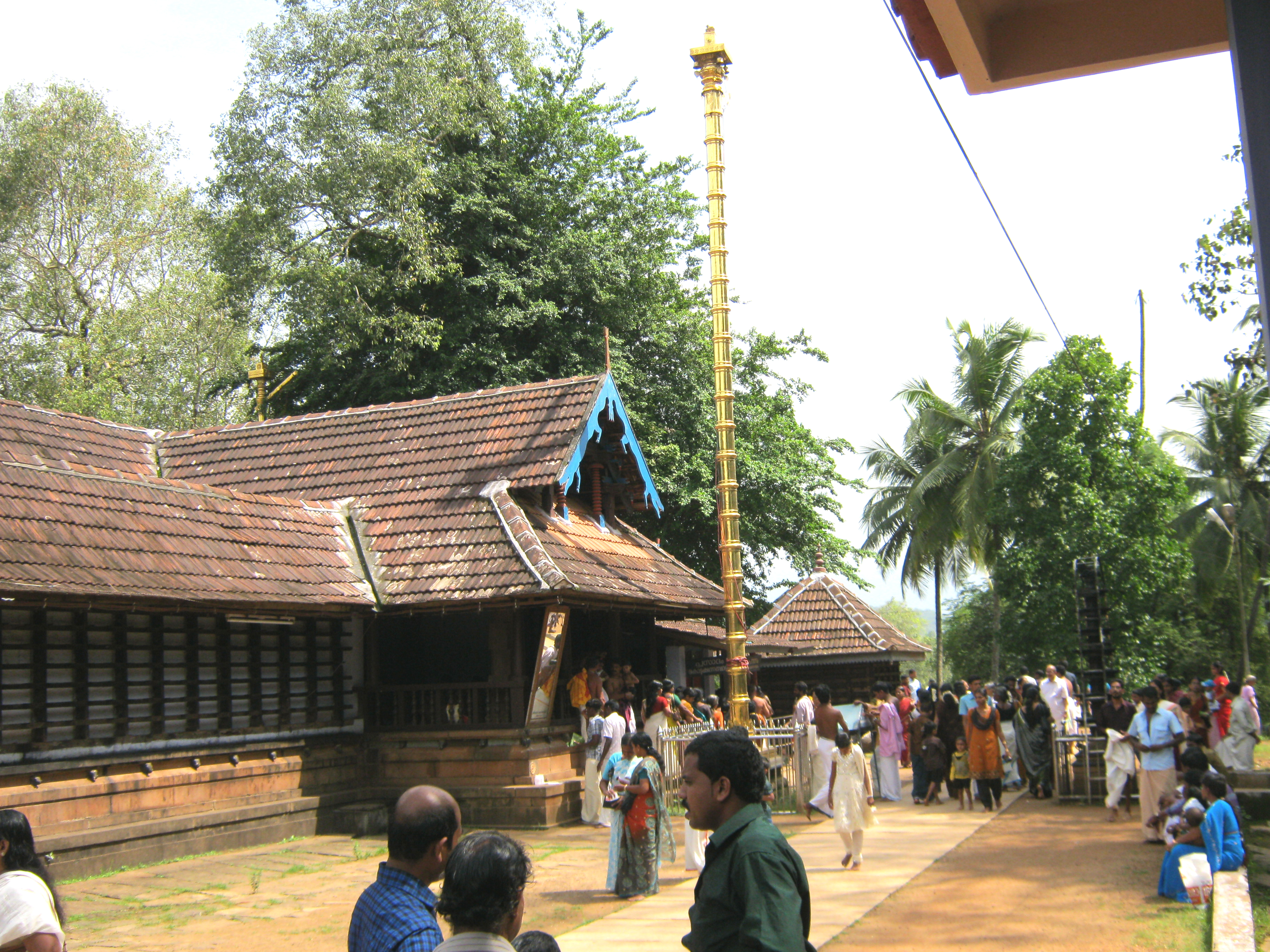
Thirumandhamkunnu Temple. Angadipuram

Angadippuram is a village and a census town in Perinthalmanna taluk and major suburb of Perinthalmanna town, in the Malappuram District of Kerala. It was the capital of the powerful medieval kingdom of Valluvanad. Angadippuram is also known for Angadippuram Laterite, a notified geo-heritage monument. Angadippuram is famous for its two temples, the Thirumandhamkunnu Temple and the Tali Mahadeva Temple. Kozhikode - Palakkad National Highway 966 passes through the town and Angadipuram Railway Station is one of the major railway stations on the Nilambur - Shornur Line of Palakkad Division, Southern Railways. It is connected to the major cities Kochi and Thiruvananthapuram by this line.

== Places of interest ==
Angadippuram is actually a temple town, as it is rich in the case of number of temples. Nearly 12 temples are there in the village. The Thirumandhankunnu Bhagawathy Temple was built by the erstwhile kings/rulers of Valluvanad. The goddess Bhagavathi at the temple is the family god (kuladaivam) of the Valluvokonathiris. This temple has gained prominence lately. The village is one of the biggest in the Malappuram district. It is filled with traditions and a flourishing tourism business. Apart from Thirumandhamkunnu Bhagavathy Temple, there is yet another important pilgrim centre in the village is the Tali temple which is also near the highway. The holy shrine in Puthanangadi is another place of solace to the masses which is 2 kilometers away from the town in Valanchery road.

Angadippuram is now known as the temple town of Malabar. There are so many Hindu temples situated here including Sree Thirumanthamkunnu temple and Thali temple.

Thirurkkad is an automobile area near angadippuram, there are lot of automobile showrooms in Thirurkkad and its near places.

== History ==
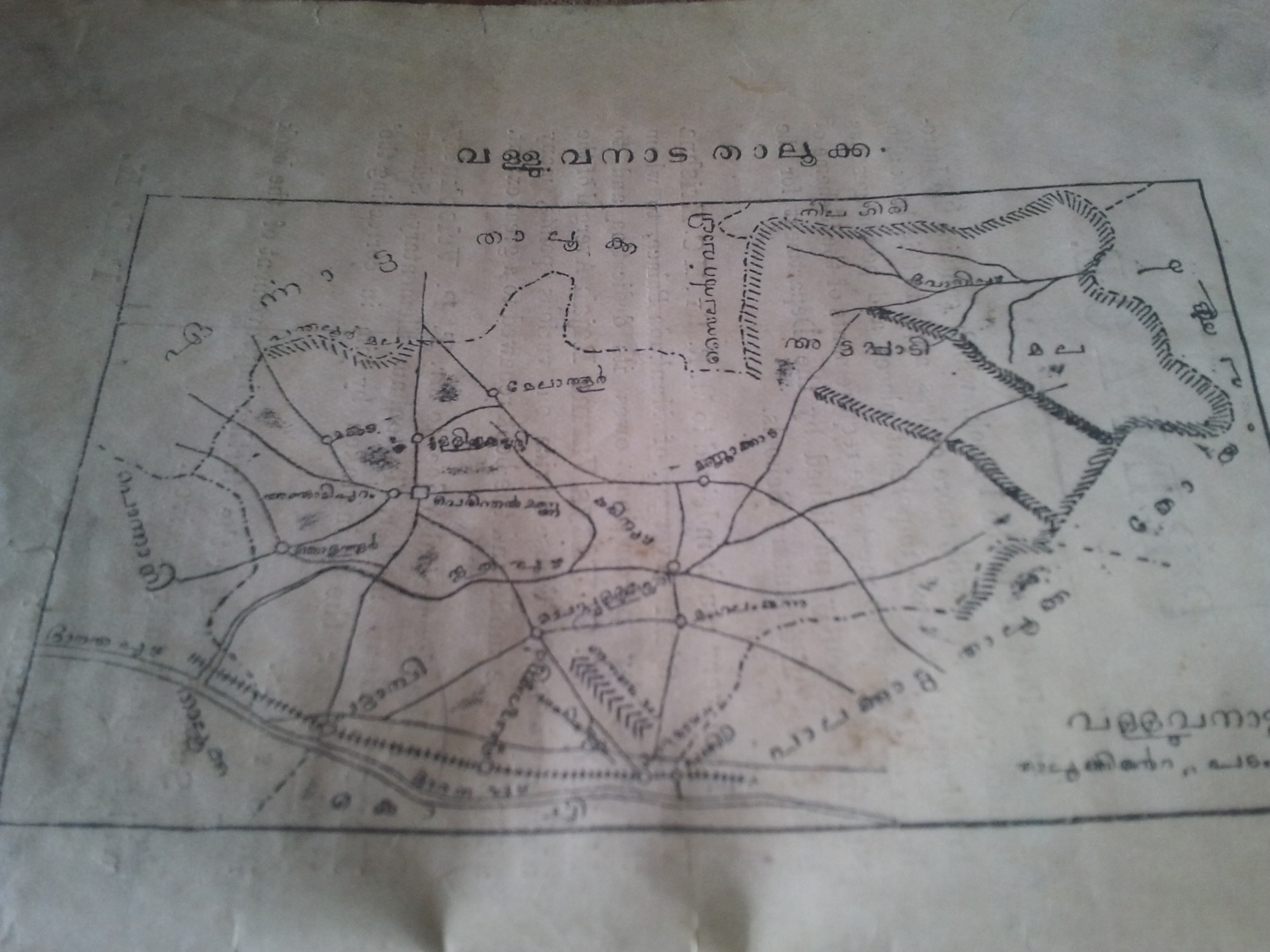
Valluvanad Taluk in Malappuram Division of Erstwhile Malabar District (1909)

Angadipuram was the capital of Valluvanad. Valluvanad was ruled by a Samanthan Nair clan known as Vellodis, similar to the Eradis of neighbouring Eranad and Nedungadis of Nedunganad. The rulers of Valluvanad were known by the title Valluvakonathiri/Vellattiri.

Valluvanad was an erstwhile princely state in the present state of Kerala, that extended from the Bharathapuzha river in the South to the Panthaloor Mala in the North. On the west, it was bounded by the Arabian Sea at Ponnani and on the east by the Attapadi Hills.

== Administration ==
Angadippuram is a census town, which is governed by Angadippuram Grama Panchayat. Angadippuram Grama Panchayat is the local body responsible for governance; it is divided into 24 wards; each represented by an elected member. The president and vice president heads the gram panchayat; who are elected by the ward members. In Panchayati Raj System; it's is part of Perinthalmanna Block Panchayat and Malappuram District Panchayat.

Angadippuram is represented in the Perinthalmanna Block Panchayat by four members, elected from the divisions of Angadippuram, Thirurkkad, Valamboor, and Pariyapuram. In the Malappuram District Panchayat, Angadippuram constitutes a division represented by one elected member.

Angadippuram is part of the Mankada constituency of the Kerala Legislative Assembly and is represented by Manjalamkuzhi Ali.

== Transport ==
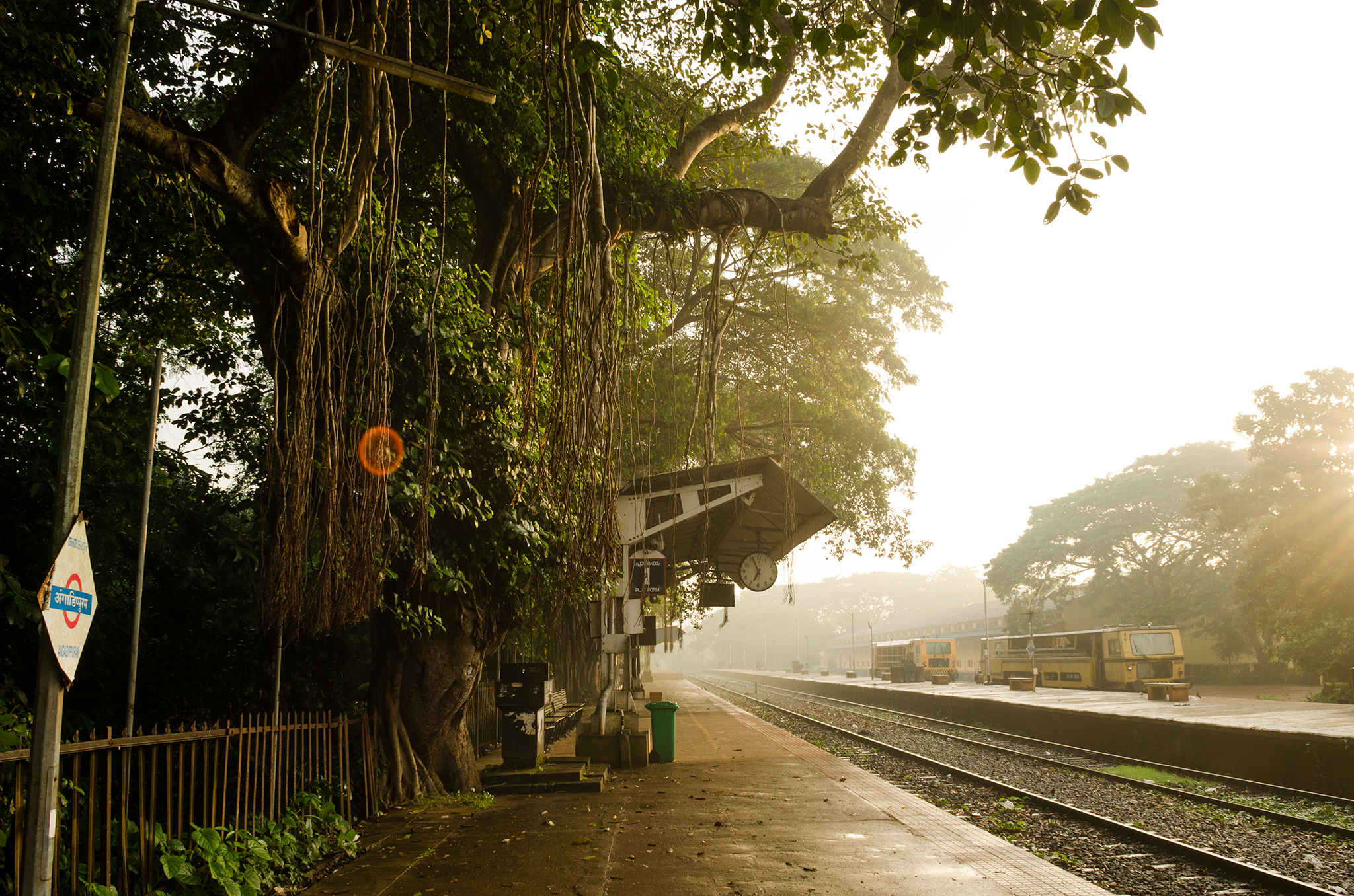
Angadipuram railway station

Railway

Angadipuram railway station is a major rAssembly.ionsation on the Nilambur–Shoranur line.

Trains are availabl In the Malappuram District Panchayat, Angadippuram constitutes a division represented by one elected member. e from here to Nilambur, Shoranur, Palakkad, Kottayam and Kochuveli.

Road

Angadippuram is situated on the Kozhikode–Palakkad National Highway 966.

National Highway No.66 passes through valanchery and the northern stretch connects to Goa and Mumbai. The southern stretch connects to Cochin and Trivandrum.

Valancheri–Nilambur State Highway 73 joins the NH 966 at Angadippuram.another important road is State Highway 60 which starts from Angadippuram and ends in Cherukara.

== Notable people ==
- P. Geetha, feminist writer and critic.
- Nandanar

== See also ==
- Nilambur - Shoranur Railway Line
- Angadipuram Laterite
- Perinthalmanna
- Valluvanad
