= Aliparamba =

- Village
- Location in Kerala, India Aliparamba (India)
- Coordinates: 10.9176000°N 76.287790°E
- Country: India
- State: Kerala
- District: Malappuram

Government
  - Type: Gram Panchayat
  - Body: Aliparamba Gram Panchayat
  - Panchayat President: Ayisha Mekkottil (IUML)

Population (2011)
  - Total: 24,859

Languages
  - Official: Malayalam, English
- Time zone: UTC+5:30 (IST)
- PIN: 679357
- Telephone code: 04933234
- Vehicle registration: KL-53
- Nearest city: Perinthalmanna
- Lok Sabha constituency: Malappuram
- Niyama Sabha constituency: Perinthalmanna
- Website: aliparambapanchayat.lsgkerala.gov.in

Aliparamba is a village and a gram panchyat in Malappuram district in the state of Kerala, India.

== Demographics ==
As of 2011 India census, Aliparamba had a population of 24,859, with 12,056 males and 12,803 females.

== Transportation ==
Aliparamba village connects other parts of India through Perinthalmanna and Cherpulassery towns. National Highway No. 66 passes through Tirur, and the northern stretch connects to Goa and Mumbai. The southern stretch connects to Cochin and Trivandrum. Highway No. 966 leads to Palakkad and Coimbatore. The nearest airport is at Kozhikode, and the nearest major railway station is at Shoranur. For local trains, Angadipuram Railway Station is an option.
