= Perinthalmanna =

- Town / Municipality
- Perintalmanna
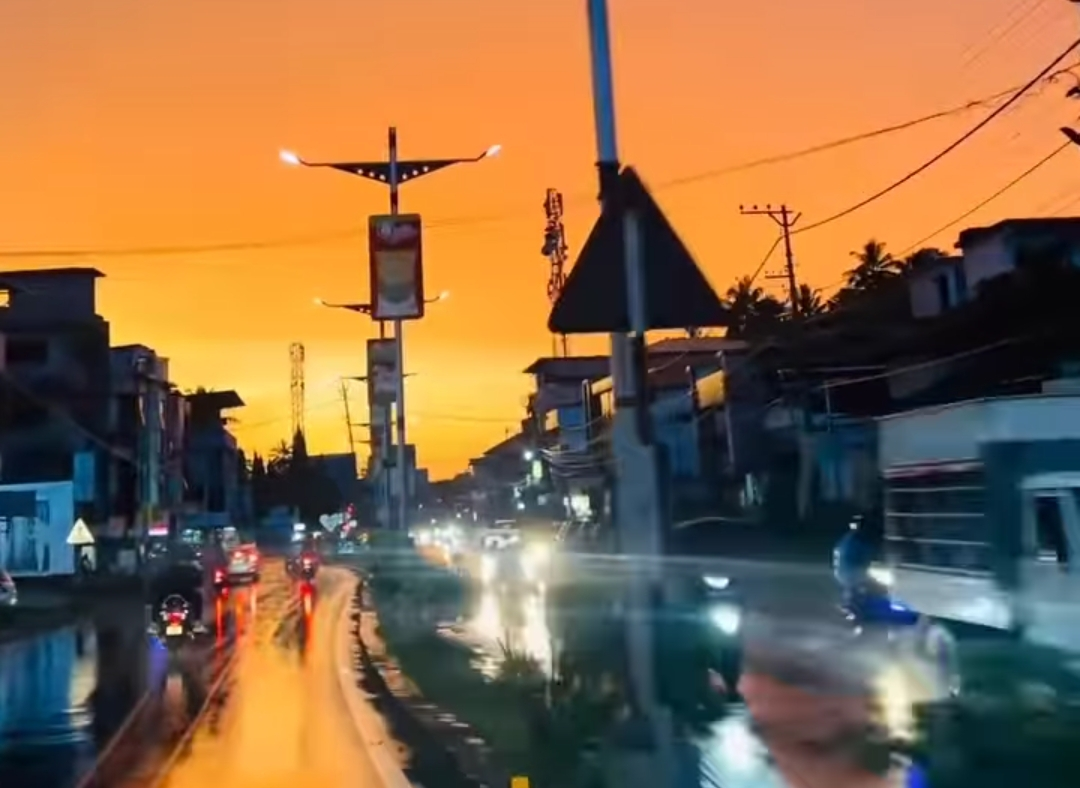
- Night view of Perinthalmanna Municipal town

- Location in Kerala, India Perinthalmanna (India)
- Coordinates: 10.9765415°N 76.2269231°E
- Country: India
- State: Kerala
- District: Malappuram
- Taluk: Perinthalmanna
- Revenue villages: Perintalmanna; Pathaikkara

Government
  - Type: Second Grade Municipality
  - Body: Perinthalmanna Municipality
  - Chairperson: Surayya Farooq (IUML)
  - Vice Chairperson: M.B Mohammed Fasal (INC)
  - M.L.A: Najeeb Kanthapuram (UDF)

Area
  - Total: 34.41 km^{2} (13.29 sq mi)

Population (2011)
  - Total: 49,723
  - Density: 1,445/km^{2} (3,743/sq mi)

Languages
  - Official: Malayalam, English
- Time zone: UTC+5:30 (IST)
- PIN: 679322
- Telephone code: 04933
- Vehicle registration: KL-53
- State Assembly Constituency: Perinthalmanna LAC
- Lok Sabha Constituency: Malappuram HPC
- Website: perinthalmannamunicipality.lsgkerala.gov.in

Perinthalmanna is a town and a municipality in Malappuram district, Kerala, India. It serves as the administrative centre for the Perinthalmanna taluk, as well as a revenue division, a community development block, and a police sub-division bearing the same name. It was the headquarters of the former Walluvanad Taluk in Malabar district during British rule. The town is located 20 km (12 mi) southwest of the district headquarters Malappuram at the centre of the Kozhikode–Palakkad National Highway 966.

== History ==
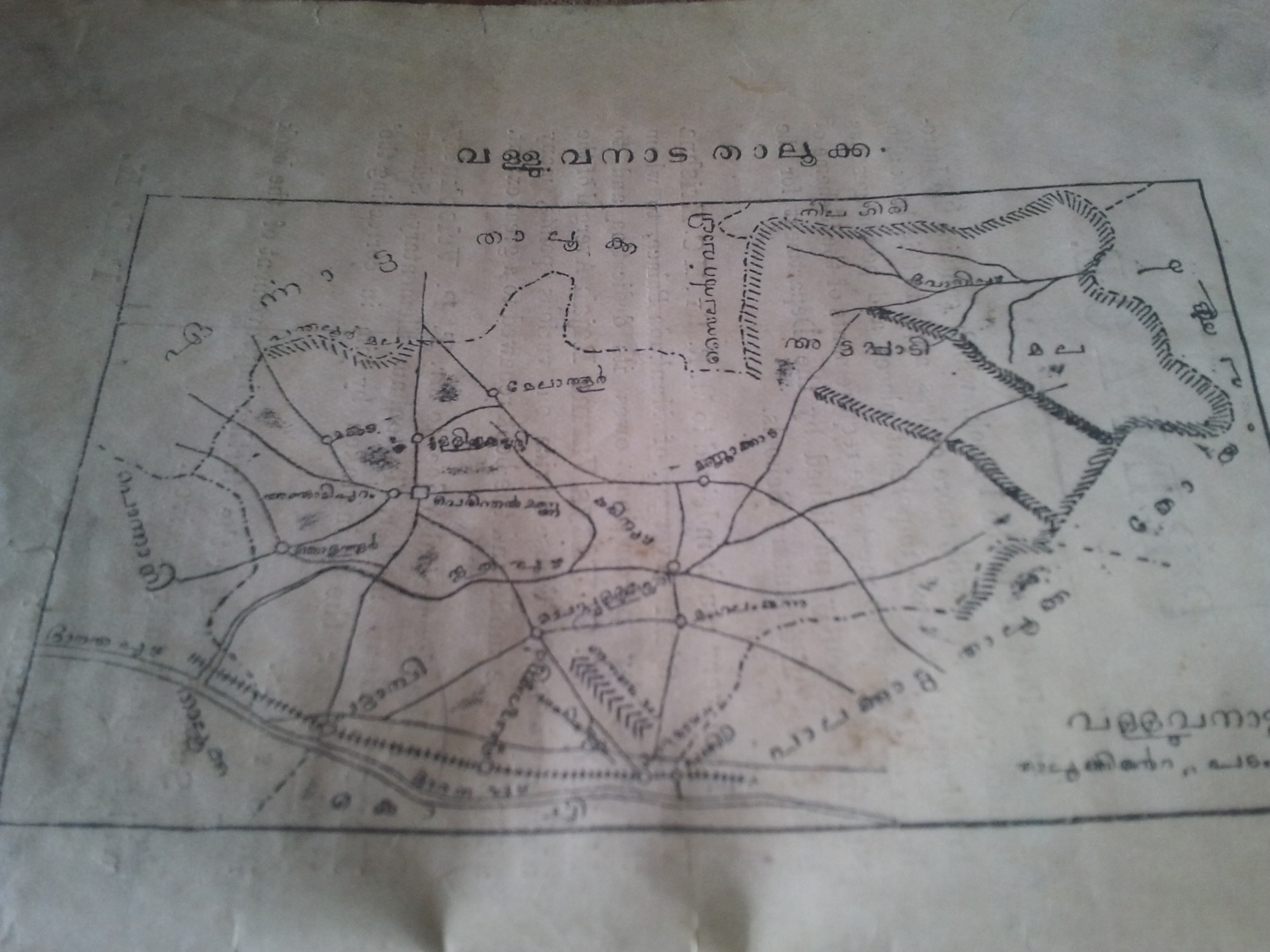
Map of Valluvanad Taluk in Malabar District (1909)

During the last decades of the eighteenth century, the region came under the control of the vast Kingdom of Mysore, and was the headquarters of the Kingdom of Valluvanad. Perinthalmanna, along with the towns of Malappuram, Manjeri, and Tirurangadi, was one of the main centres of the Malabar Rebellion of 1921. Now it is one of the important commercial centre in Malappuram district.

Perinthalmanna became a Grama Panchayat in 1933 under the Malabar District board. The town was later upgraded to a municipality on 10 February 1990. As of the 2011 India census, Perinthalmanna had a population of 49,723 spread over an area of 34 km^{2} (13 sq mi). Perinthalmanna serves as the headquarters of one of the two revenue divisions in Malappuram district, having jurisdiction over Perinthalmanna, Eranad, and Nilambur taluks. Perinthalmanna is also as the headquarters of Perinthalmanna Block Panchayat and Revenue Divisional Office and Sub Divisional Police Office.

== Geography ==
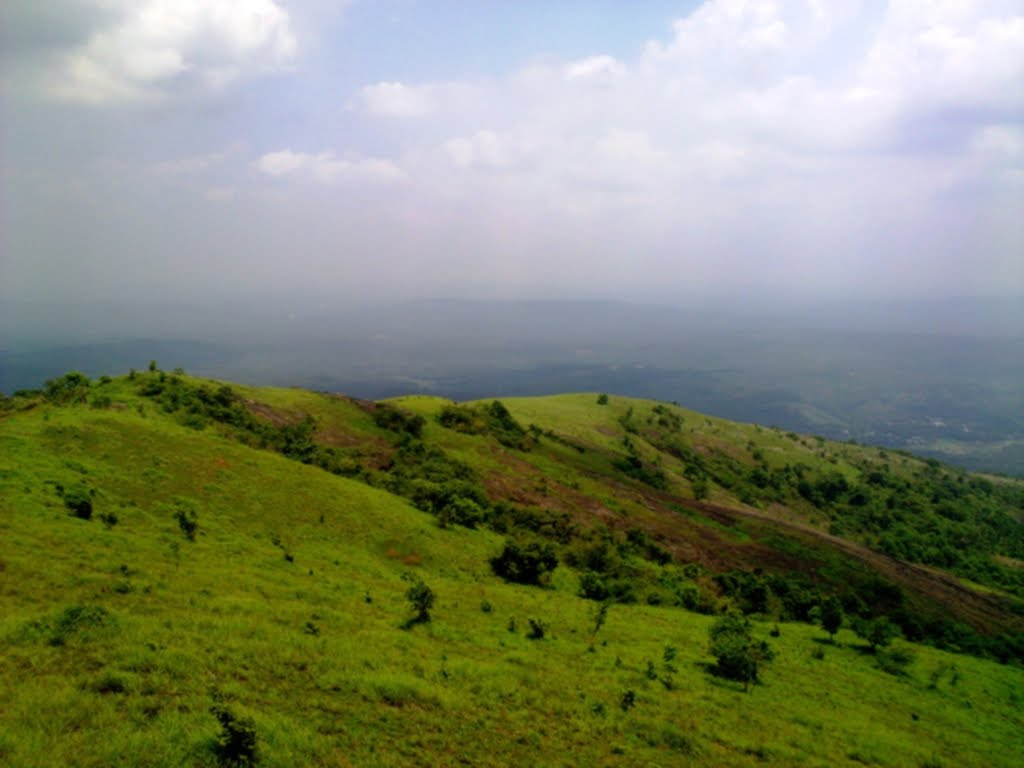
Kodikuthimala hill station, east of Perinthalmanna

The Thuthapuzha, a tributary of the Bharathappuzha (Ponnani River), which is also the longest river of Kerala, flows through Thootha, a village located about 10 km from Perinthalmanna. The Western Ghats mountain range begins east of Perinthalmanna. Kodikuthimala hillstation is located in the Thazhekode village of Perinthalmanna Taluk, which also shares its boundary with the municipality of Perinthalmanna. Melattur village of Perinthalmanna Taluk is a part of Nilgiri Biosphere Reserve.

Angadipuram Laterite is a notified National Geo-heritage Monument located about two kilometres (1.2 mi) west of the Perinthalmanna town centre.

Gulmohar flowering trees are widely seen in the Perinthalmanna area.

== Demographics ==
Religion in Perinthalmanna municipality (2011)
1. Islam (58.5%)
2. Hinduism (38.4%)
3. Christianity (2.97%)
4. Other (0.11%)

The population of Perinthalmanna was 49,723 as of the 2011 census. Males constituted 47.3% and females 52.7%. Malayalam is the most spoken language in the town. Perinthalmanna has been a multi-ethnic and multi-religious town since the early medieval period. Muslims form the largest religious group, followed by Hindus and Christians. The municipality of Perinthalmanna has an average literacy rate of 95.3%, which is higher than the state average of 94.0%.

== Civic administration ==
The town is administered by the Perinthalmanna Municipality, headed by a chairperson. For administrative purposes, the municipality is divided into 37 wards, from each of which members of the municipal council are elected for five years. The incumbent Municipal Chairperson is Surayya Farooq, and the Vice Chairperson is M. B. Mohammed Fasal.

The municipality functions through six Standing Committees—Finance, Development, Welfare, Public Works, Health and Education—each headed by a chairperson responsible for sectoral planning, development, and administrative oversight.

As of 2011 India census, Perinthalmanna Municipal Region had a population of 49,723 spreading an area of 34 km^{2}. Following the 2025 ward delimitation, Perinthalmanna Municipality now comprises 37 wards, increased from 34. These wards are listed in the below table:

Members of the Perinthalmanna Municipal Council (2025)
| Ward Details | | | Councillor | Party | Alliance | Ward Map |
| Ward No. | Ward name | Ward name in Malayalam | Councillor | Party | Alliance | Ward Map |
|---|---|---|---|---|---|---|
| 1 | Cheerattamanna | ചീരട്ടമണ്ണ | Attuparambil Sharath | CPI(M) | LDF | |
| 2 | Manathumangalam | മാനത്തുമംഗലം | Aleena Mariyam | INC | UDF | |
| 3 | Kakkooth | കക്കൂത്ത് | Rajeena Saleem | IUML | UDF | |
| 4 | Mundathappadi | മുണ്ടത്തപ്പടി | Pacheeri Husaina Nasar | Ind. | UDF-backed | |
| 5 | Valiyangadi | വലിയങ്ങാടി | Mohammed Mansoor Nechiyil | Ind. | LDF-backed | |
| 6 | Kulirmala | കുളിർമല | Nalakath Mohammed Basheer | IUML | UDF | |
| 7 | Chembankunnu | ചെമ്പൻകുന്ന് | Ajil Kumar | CPI(M) | LDF | |
| 8 | Kunnumpuram | കുന്നുംപുറം | Sameena Jaffer | IUML | UDF | |
| 9 | Aalakunnu | ആലക്കുന്ന് | Unais Kakkooth | IUML | UDF | |
| 10 | Ponniyakurussi | പൊന്നിയക്കുറിശ്ശി | Cheriyil Saleena M | IUML | UDF | |
| 11 | Idukkumukham | ഇടുക്കുമുഖം | Rashik K. M. | Ind. | UDF-backed | |
| 12 | Manazhi Stand | മനഴി സ്റ്റാന്റ് | Fazal Mohammed (Vice Chairperson) | INC | UDF | |
| 13 | Panchama | പഞ്ചമ | Dinesh | INC | UDF | |
| 14 | Kuttippara | കുട്ടിപ്പാറ | Pacheeri Subair | Ind. | UDF-backed | |
| 15 | Kovilakampadi | കൊവിലകംപടി | Surayya Farooq (chairperson) | IUML | UDF | |
| 16 | Pathaikkara U.P. School | പാതായിക്കര യുപി സ്കൂൾ | Preetha | CPI(M) | LDF | |
| 17 | Manappadi | മനപ്പടി | Sreenivasan | CPI(M) | LDF | |
| 18 | P.T.M. College | പി.ടി.എം കോളേജ് | Sherlija C. P. | CPI(M) | LDF | |
| 19 | Thanneerpanthal | തണ്ണീർപന്തൽ | Arun | IUML | UDF | |
| 20 | Olinkara | ഒലിങ്കര | Askar Karimpanakkal | Ind. | UDF-backed | |
| 21 | Aanathaanam | ആനത്താനം | Ambili Manoj | CPI(M) | LDF | |
| 22 | Kizhakkekara | കിഴക്കേകര | Vandana | CPI(M) | LDF | |
| 23 | Thekkekara | തെക്കേക്കര | Thottasseri Khadeeja | IUML | UDF | |
| 24 | Padinjarekkara | പടിഞ്ഞാറേക്കര | Sunil Kumar M. P. | CPI(M) | LDF | |
| 25 | Valayammoochi | വളയമ്മൂച്ചി | Sumayya | Ind. | UDF-backed | |
| 26 | Aasharikkara | ആശാരിക്കര | Kalathil Musthafa | Ind. | UDF-backed | |
| 27 | Marukaraparamba | മറുകരപറമ്പ് | Mohammed Shakeer T. | CPI(M) | LDF | |
| 28 | Kunnappally South | കുന്നപ്പള്ളി സൗത്ത് | Jumana Saleem Pathath | CPI(M) | LDF | |
| 29 | Kollakode | കൊല്ലക്കോട് | Mohammed Fazil Kakran | IUML | UDF | |
| 30 | Vattapara | വട്ടപ്പാറ | Pacheeri Naseema Firoz | IUML | UDF | |
| 31 | Thekkinkode | തെക്കിങ്കോട് | Jishnu Narayanan | CPI(M) | LDF | |
| 32 | Kavungaparamba | കാവുങ്ങപറമ്പ് | Surayyabanu (Muthu) | Ind. | LDF-backed | |
| 33 | J.N. Road Central | ജെ.എൻ. റോഡ് സെൻട്രൽ | Pathath Smrithi Rajesh | CPI(M) | LDF | |
| 34 | Thottakkara | തോട്ടക്കര | Nisha | INC | UDF | |
| 35 | Puthoor | പുത്തൂർ | V. Rahul | CPI(M) | LDF | |
| 36 | Muttungal | മുട്ടുങ്കൽ | Bindu Manikandan | CPI(M) | LDF | |
| 37 | Lemon Valley | നാരങ്ങകുണ്ട് | Sabitha | INC | UDF | |

Legend:

Communist Party of India (Marxist)
Indian National Congress
Indian Union Muslim League
Independent
United Democratic Front (Kerala)
Left Democratic Front (Kerala)

Note:

- UDF-backed / LDF-backed indicates Independents supported by the respective alliance.

=== Perinthalmanna Municipality election, 2025 ===
| S.No. | Party name | Party symbol | Number of councillors |
|---|---|---|---|
| 01 | UDF | | 15 |
| 02 | LDF | | 14 |
| 03 | Independents | | 8 |

In the 2025 Perinthalmanna municipal election, the UDF won 21 of 37 wards, ending LDF's control since 1995. Within UDF, 10 Muslim League, 5 Muslim League independents, 5 Congress, and 1 Congress rebel were elected. For LDF, 14 CPM and 2 Left independents won.

=== Perinthalmanna Municipality election 2020 ===
| S.No. | Party name | Party symbol | Number of councillors |
|---|---|---|---|
| 01 | LDF | | 17 |
| 02 | UDF | | 09 |
| 03 | Independents | | 08 |

== Law and order ==
The municipality comes under the jurisdiction of the Perinthalmanna Police Station, which was formed on 1 September 1988. This police station is part of Perinthalmanna Subdivision under Malappuram police district. The station has the jurisdiction over the revenue villages of Perinthalmanna, Pathaikara, Angadipuram, Elamkulam, Aliparamba, Anamangad, Arakkuparamba, Thazhekode, and parts of Pulamantol and Valambur.
The Perinthalmanna Police Station functions under an Inspector of Police designated as the Station House Officer (SHO). The station has Kerala Police personnel of various ranks, including SIs, ASIs, SCPOs, and CPOs, who perform various policing duties.

Perinthalmanna Municipality, Thazhekkode Grama Panchayat, Alipparamba Grama Panchayat, Elamkulam Grama Panchayat, and Angadippuram Grama Panchayat are included in the Perinthalmanna Police Station limit.

The border police stations are headquartered at Kolathur, Mankada, Melattur, Koppam, Nattukal and Cherpulassery.

Perinthalmanna town is also the headquarters for one of the six subdivisions of Malappuram District Police. The office of the Deputy Superintendent of Police, Perinthalmanna, is situated in the town, and the police stations at Perinthalmanna, Kolathur, Mankada, Melattur, Pandikkad, and Karuvarakundu, as well as the Perinthalmanna Traffic Enforcement Unit, fall under the jurisdiction of the Perinthalmanna Subdivision.

== Courts ==
The court complex at Perinthalmanna has the following courts:

- Munsiff-Magistrate Court, Perinthalmanna
  - a combined lower civil and criminal court, with civil jurisdiction over Perinthalmanna Taluk and criminal jurisdiction over Perinthalmanna and Kolathur Police Stations.
- Judicial First Class Magistrate Court II, Perinthalmanna
  - A lower criminal court that hears cases arising from the Melattur, Pandikkad, Karuvarakund, and Mankada Police Stations.
- Fast Track Special Court (POCSO)
  - dedicated to the speedy disposal of POCSO cases.

== Elected representatives ==
Perinthalmanna assembly constituency consists Perinthalmanna Municipality and surrounding panchayats of Melattur, Vettathoor, Thazhekkode, Aliparamba, Elamkulam and Pulamanthole. It is part of the Malappuram Lok Sabha constituency. The current MLA, Najeeb Kanthapuram, and MP, E. T. Mohammed Basheer, are from the Indian Union Muslim League (IUML), respectively.

MLA of Perinthalmanna
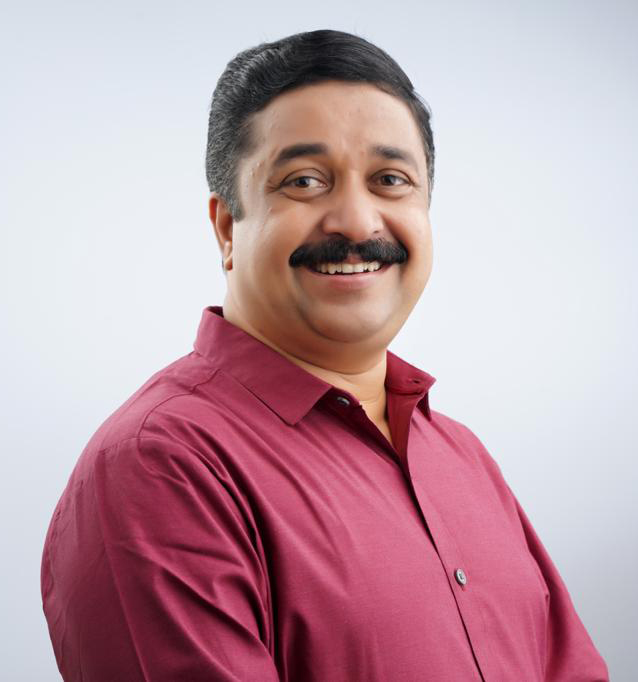
- Incumbent; Najeeb Kanthapuram (IUML) since 2021
- Abbreviation: MLA
- Member of: Kerala Legislative Assembly
- Precursor: Manjalamkuzhi Ali
- First holder: P. Govindan Nambiar

Member of Parliament (Lok Sabha)
- Incumbent; E. T. Mohammed Basheer (IUML) since 2021
- Abbreviation: MP
- Member of: Parliament of India (Loksabha)

== Health care ==
Perinthalmanna is widely regarded as a major health care hub in Kerala, often referred to as the "hospital city" of Malabar due to the high concentration of multi-speciality hospitals, super-speciality centres, and clinics located in and around the town. Patients from across Malappuram district and neighbouring regions such as Palakkad, Thrissur, and Kozhikode frequently seek medical treatment here.

The following are the major hospitals in Perinthalmanna:
Government sector

- Government District Hospital, Perinthalmanna (under Malappuram District Panchayat)
- Government Ayurvedic Hospital, Perinthalmanna (under Perinthalmanna Municipality)
- Government Homeopathic Dispensary, Perinthalmanna (under Perinthalmanna Municipality)

Private sector

- MES Medical College Hospital, Angadippuram, Perinthalmanna
- Moulana Hospital, Perinthalmanna
- Kims Al Shifa Hospital, Perinthalmanna
- EMS Memorial Co-operative Hospital & Research Centre, Perinthalmanna
- Ramdas Clinic and Nursing Home, Perinthalmanna
- Amina Hospital, Perinthalmanna
- Perinthalmanna Nursing Home (Dr. Balagopal Memorial Hospital), Perinthalmanna
- Crafts Hospital, Perinthalmanna
- Ascent ENT Hospital, Perinthalmanna
- Armc Aegis Mother and Child Hospital, Perinthalmanna
- J.J Hospital for Children, Perinthalmanna
- Al Salama Eye Hospital, Perinthalmanna
- Abate Eye Hospital, Perinthalmanna

== Notable people ==
- Manjalamkuzhi Ali – the former MLA from the constituency
- Vinay Govind – film director
- Paloli Mohammed Kutty – politician, social worker and former MLA from the constituency
- E. M. S. Namboodiripad, first Chief Minister of Kerala, hails from Elamkulam
- V. Sasikumar – politician, labour union leader and former MLA from the constituency
- Nalakath Soopy – MLA for 26 years from 1980 to 2006 and former Minister for Education
- P. Sreeramakrishnan – politician and former speaker of Kerala Legislative Assembly
- Vignesh Puthur - cricketor

== See also ==
- Education in Perinthalmanna
- Perinthalmanna (State Assembly constituency)
- Perinthalmanna Taluk
