= Attappadi taluk =

Tehsil in Palakkad district

Attappadi
- Taluk
- Attappadi
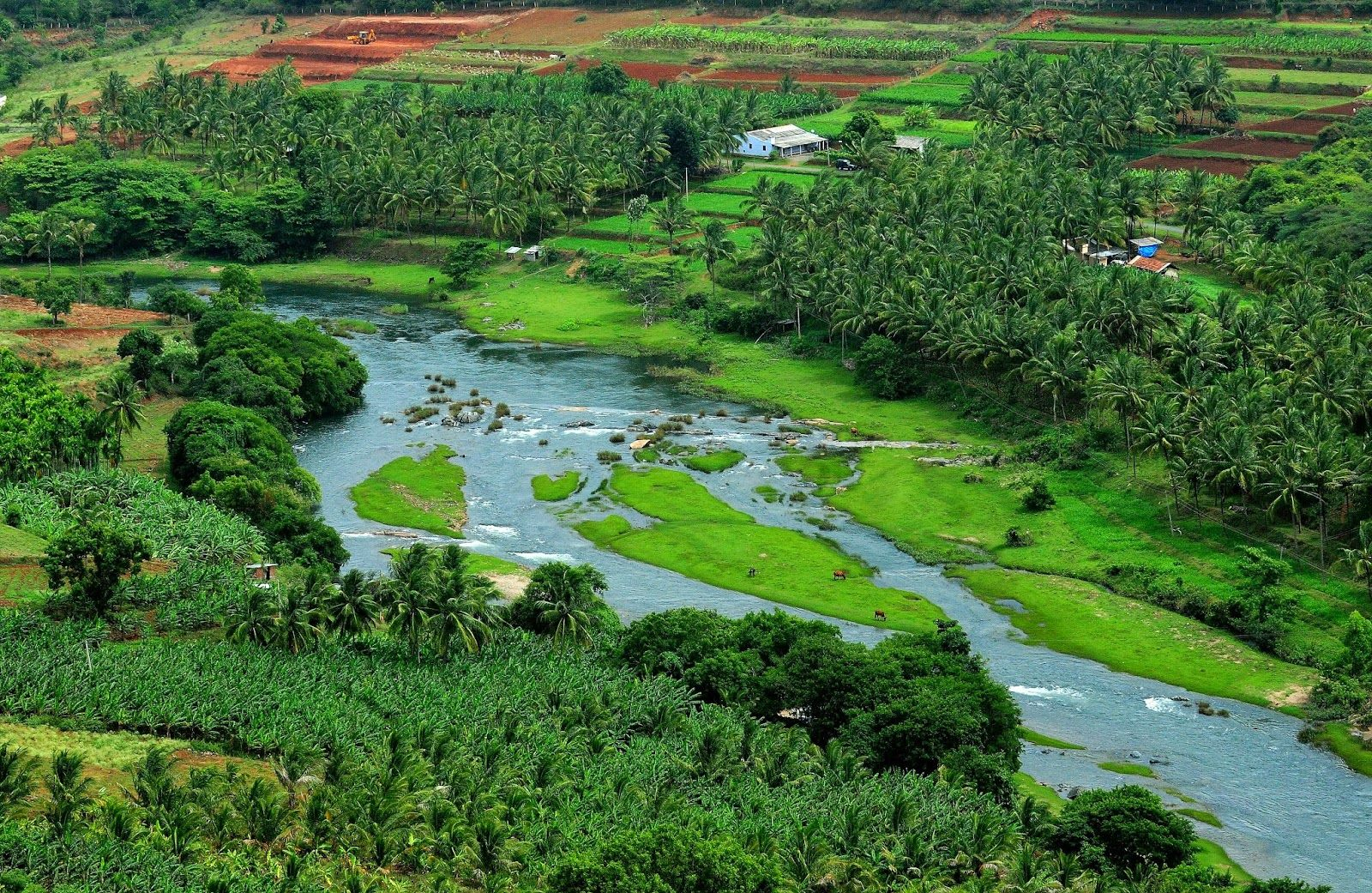

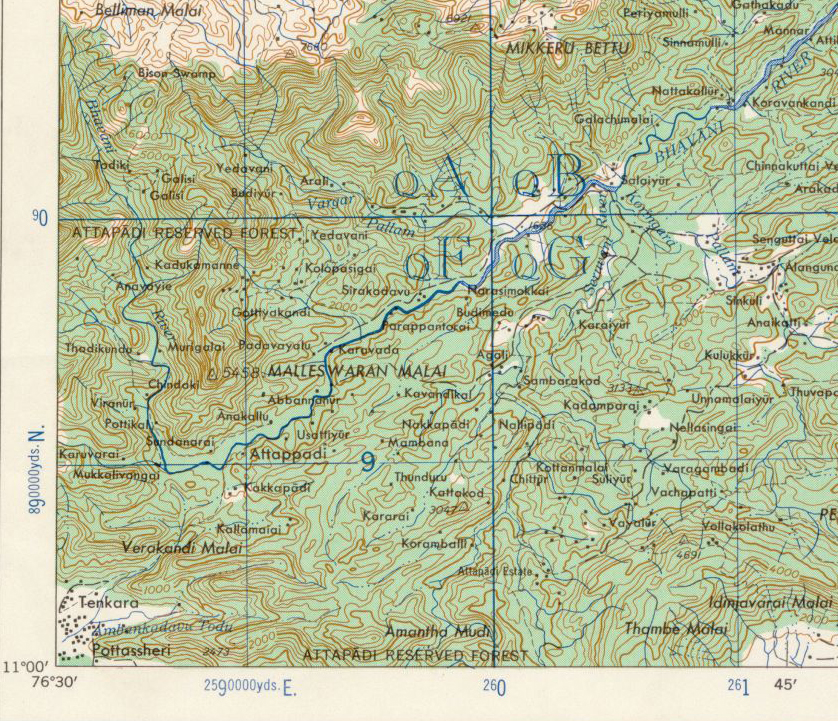
- Attappady Reserve Forest

- Location in Kerala, India Attappadi (India)
- Coordinates: 11°5′0″N 76°35′0″E
- Country: India
- State: Kerala
- District: Palakkad district

Government
  - Type: Taluk
  - Body: Attappadi Block Panchayat

Area
  - Total: 734.62 km^{2} (283.64 sq mi)

Population (2011)
  - Total: 64,083
  - Density: 87.233/km^{2} (225.93/sq mi)

Languages
  - Official: Malayalam, English
- Time zone: UTC+5:30 (IST)
- Postal code: 678582
- Vehicle registration: KL-50
- Nearest city: Palakkad
- Website: www.visitattappadi.com

Attappadi (Malayalam: [ɐʈːɐpːaːɖi], HQ:Agali) is the one and only tribal taluk in Kerala state covering an area of 735 km^{2} (284 sq mi). It was carved out of Mannarkkad taluk in Palakkad district in February 2021. Attappadi Reserve Forest is a protected area comprising 249 km^{2} of land in the western parts of Attappadi. It is one of the reserved forests and protected forests of India. Attappadi valley in Palakkad district along with the neighbouring Chaliyar valley of the Nilambur region (Eastern Eranad region) in Malappuram district is known for natural Gold fields which are also seen in the other regions of Nilgiri Biosphere Reserve.

Saint George Orthodox Church in Attappady covers the Malankara Orthodox Christians in the area. This parish is under the Diocese of Malabar of the Malankara Orthodox Syrian Church.

== History ==
Mannarkkad and Attappadi were parts of Valluvanad Swaroopam dynasty in the medieval period with their headquarters at Angadipuram near Perinthalmanna in the present-day Malappuram district. According to local legends, the last Cheraman Perumal ruler gave a vast extension of land in South Malabar during his journey to Mecca to one of their governors, Valluvakonathiri, and left for pilgrimage. Valluvanad was famous for the Mamankam festivals at Tirunavaya, held once in 12 years and the endless wars against the Zamorin of Calicut.

During the last decades of the eighteenth century, the region came under the control of the vast Kingdom of Mysore. Under British Raj, it was a part of Valluvanad Taluk of Malappuram Revenue Division in Malabar District. Perinthalmanna was the headquarters of the Old Walluvanad Taluk in the British Malabar District. Mannarkkad, along with the towns of Perinthalmanna, Malappuram, Manjeri, and Tirurangadi, was one of the main centres of the Malabar Rebellion of 1921.

Walluvanad Taluk was divided into six Revenue blocks: Mankada, Perinthalmanna, Mannarkkad, Ottapalam, Sreekrishnapuram, and Pattambi. Walluvanad was one of the two Taluks included in the Malappuram Revenue Division (the other being Eranad Taluk) of British Malabar. On 1 November 1957, the Walluvanad Taluk was divided into two: Perinthalmanna Taluk and Ottapalam Taluk. The Revenue blocks of Mankada, Perinthalmanna, and Mannarkkad were included in the Perinthalmanna Taluk, while Ottapalam, Sreekrishnapuram, and Pattambi were transferred to the newly formed Ottapalam Taluk. Later Attappadi Revenue block was separated from Mannarkkad Block. During the formation of Malappuram district on 16 June 1969, the Revenue blocks of Mannarkkad and Attappadi were separated from Perinthalmanna Taluk to form Mannarkkad Taluk.

Later some years, a portion of Karuvarakundu village in Eranad Taluk (now Karuvarakundu is a part of Nilambur Taluk) of Malappuram district was transferred to the Silent Valley area of Attappadi. In February 2021, Attappadi tribal taluk formed by carving out from Mannarkkad taluk.

== Geography ==
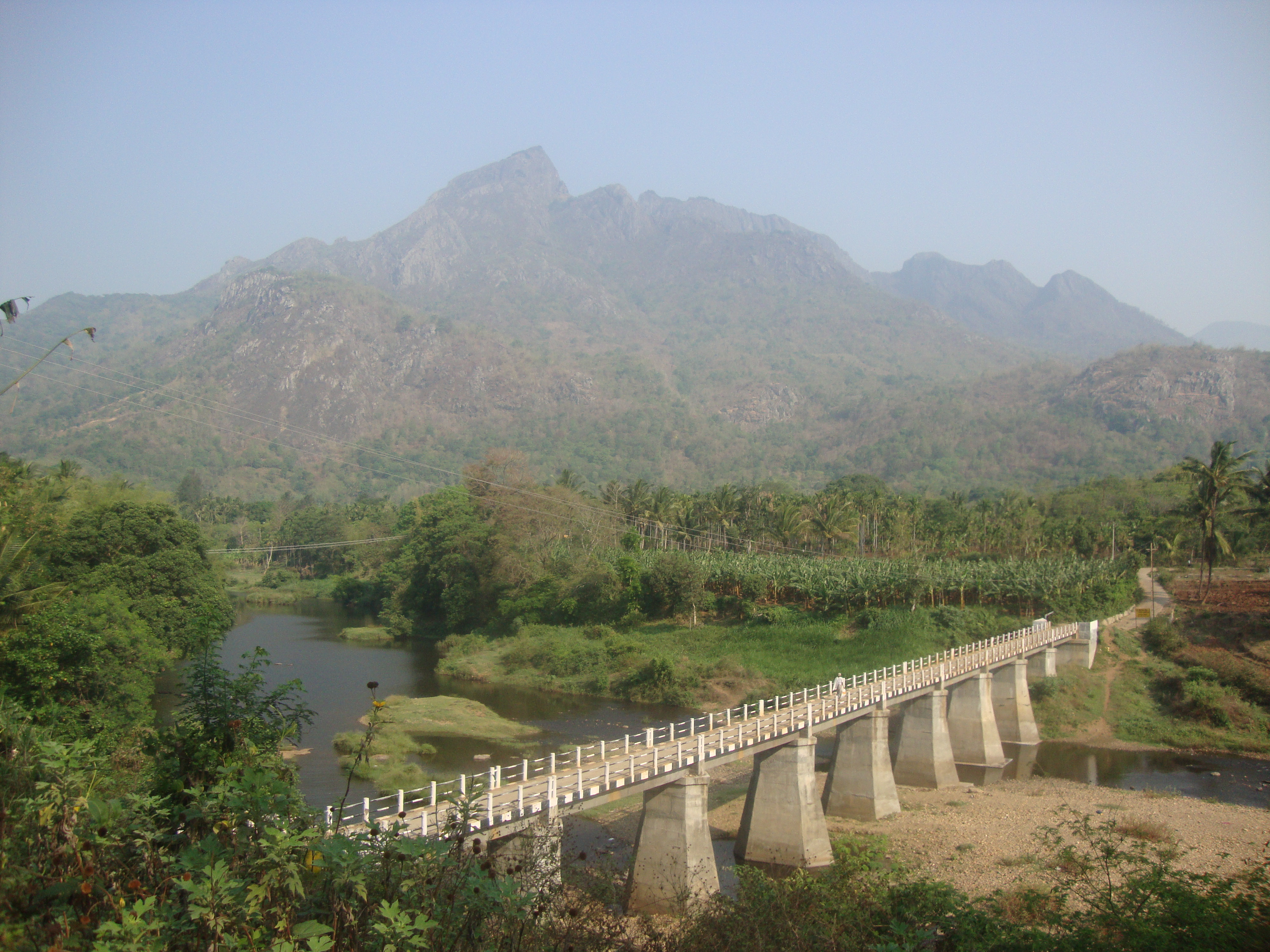
Chemmannur Bridge in Bhavani River, Attappadi, Kerala, India

Attappadi is an extensive mountain valley at the headwaters of the Bhavani River nestled below the Nilgiri Hills of the Western Ghats. It is bordered to the east by Coimbatore district in Tamil Nadu, on the north by the Nilgiris, south by the Palakkad taluk, and on the west by Karimba-I and II, Pottassery-I and II, and Mannarghat revenue villages of Mannarghat taluk of the Palghat District and Ernad taluk of the Malappuram district.

The 249 km^{2} Attappadi Reserve Forest is an informal buffer zone bordering the Silent Valley National Park to the West. 81 km^{2} of this forest was separated to become most of the new 94 km^{2} Bhavani Forest Range which is part of the 147.22 km^{2} Silent Valley Buffer Zone formally approved by the Kerala Cabinet on 6 June 2007. The Cabinet also sanctioned 35 staff to protect the area and two new forest stations in the Bhavani range at Anavai and Thudukki. The zone is aimed at checking the illicit cultivation of ganja (cannabis), poaching, and illicit brewing in areas adjacent to Silent Valley and help long-term sustainability of the protected area.

The elevation of Attappadi valley ranges from 750 meters (2,460 ft) to the Malleswaran peak at 11°6′32″N 76°33′8″E which rises to 1,664 meters (5,459 ft) from the center of the valley. The Bhavani River flows from the Northwest around the mountain in a tight bend past Attappadi village and continues to the Southeast.

=== Silent Valley National Park ===
It is located in the rich biodiversity of Nilgiri Biosphere Reserve. Karimpuzha Wildlife Sanctuary, New Amarambalam Reserved Forest, and Nedumkayam Rainforest in Nilambur Taluk of Malappuram district, Attappadi Reserved Forest in Mannarkkad Taluk of Palakkad district, and Mukurthi National Park of Nilgiris district, are located around Silent Valley National Park. Mukurthi peak, the fifth-highest peak in South India, and Anginda peak are also located in its vicinity. Bhavani River, a tributary of Kaveri River, and Kunthipuzha River, a tributary of Bharathappuzha river, originating in the vicinity of Silent Valley. The Kadalundi River has also its origin in Silent Valley.

== Development projects ==
In 1970 the State Planning Board assessed Attappadi as the most backward block in the state and the first Integrated Tribal Development Project in Kerala was initiated there. Since then, the state government has implemented several special development projects including the Attappadi Co-operative Farming Society, the Western Ghats Development Programme, the Attappadi Valley Irrigation Programme, and the People's Planning Programme implemented in Attappadi in 1997–2002.

The monumental palace-like "Bharat Yatra Centre" at Agali was established in 1984 by a former Prime Minister, Chandra Shekhar, to provide employment training in weaving, pottery, embroidery, and food processing to the women of this rural area. The property was occasionally occupied personally by Chandra Shekar but employment training never happened. The leaders of Girijan Sevak Samaj (GSS), the major tribal body in Attappadi, stated that the center was built on original tribal lands possessed illegally. In 2000 The Centre at Attappadi and its huge building were deserted and unoccupied.

== Geology ==
Gneisses are the predominant rocks in Attappadi. All rock types of Attappadi other than supracrustals could be categorized into seven broad types. They are charnockite, hornblende gneiss, migmatitic amphibolite, quartz biotite gneiss, quartz-feldspathic gneiss, biotite granite gneiss, and pegmatite. Among the rock types charnockite, hornblende gneiss, migmatitic amphibolite, quartz biotite gneiss, quartz-feldspathic gneiss, and biotite granite gneiss have been identified that belong to the Peninsular Gneissic Complex. The granite and pegmatite of Attappadi represent the post-kinematic intrusives. Many dolerite dykes also have been reported in this area. The bands and layers of ultramafics and mafic rocks (Ultramafic and mafic rocks represented by meta pyroxenite, talc-tremolite-actinolite schist, and amphibolites) of varying dimensions, banded iron formation(BIF), sillimanite/kyanite bearing quartzite and fuchsite quartzite occurring within the Peninsular Gneissic Complex of Attappadi area designated as Attappadi Supracrustals. Remnants and enclaves of Attappadi supracrustals occur within the gneisses. BIF is another important rock type occurring in close association with the meta pyroxenite and amphibolites.

Attappadi is unique in that a number of rock types varying in composition from ultramafic to metapelites occur as supracrustals. The metapelites are of granulite facies and the ultramafics are of greenschist facies and the enclosing gneisses represent amphibolites facies.

The area had undergone polyphase deformation. The planar S0 is defined by the layering within chromogenic precipitate (BIF). The earliest folds F1, apart from being tight and appressed occur in intrafamilial positions and also constitute the rootless folds. This folding has given rise to an axial planar penetrative foliation and is defined mainly by hornblende and to a lesser extent by chlorite and is co-parallel to the lithoboundaries identified as S0. S1 schistosity is defined by hornblende and chlorite, and this mineralogical association suggests that the deformation occurred under upper greenschist to lower amphibolite facies conditions. The subsequent F2 resulted in refolding of S1 and transposition of S1 subparallel to the F2 axial trace. The most prominent planar structures are the discrete mylonitic foliation S2 attributed to the regional NE-SW trending Bhavani shear. Mylonite development, biotitization, chlorination, and micro granulation are found associated with these surfaces.

== Gold Mineralization ==
Mani 1965 reported the panning for gold by local miners in the Siruvani River of Attappadi. Detailed studies to assess the economic potential of the Attappadi area were carried out subsequently by the Geological Survey of India. However, no primary gold prospects were identified. Nair 1993 carried out the geomorphologic mapping combined with panning of Siruvani River which led to the discovery of primary gold mineralization in epigenetic quartz vein in Puttumala. The veining, mineralization, and associated lithology of this deposit appear to be typical of the greenstone-hosted lode gold deposit. On the basis of mode of occurrence, two types of gold mineralization are recognized in Attappadi,

1. Primary gold mineralization is associated with quartz veins intruding to AS and PGC.
2. Placer deposit along the bank of Siruvani River.

The Geological Survey of India has confirmed the high gold-bearing potentiality of the rocks in the 834sq km area of the Attappadi. Gold mineralization is known from Kottathara, Puttumala, Pothupadi, Mundaiyur, and Kariyur-Vannathorai Prospects of Attappadi. Gold occurs in quartz veins traversing in BIF, metavolcanics, and hornblende and biotite gneiss. Deccan Gold Mines Limited later confirmed the earlier reported gold grades and has given the following values, Kottathara prospect: Three zones have been delineated and the prospect has ore resource of grading 13.63g/t gold according to the Geological Survey of India. While tracing the NE extension of the Kottathara prospect, stringers of quartz analyzing 9 g/t 35 g/t and 49g/t gold have been picked up in stream beds.

- Puttumala prospect: A 60 cm sample of vein quartz carrying galena (lead sulfide) from old trenches showed high spot values of gold up to 21g/t.
- Pothupadi Prospect: A sample of vein quartz traversing amphibolite assayed 4 g/t gold.
- Mundaiyur Prospect: Gold occurs in quartz veins over a length of 300 m with gold-bearing sulfides enveloping the quartz veins.
- Kariyur-Vannathorai Prospect: Samples of vein quartz have shown gold contents ranging from 3 to 20 g/t.

In Attappadi, region gold grains are found only in the native state and occur in different shapes and sizes. Visible specks of gold were noticed in the samples collected from veins, particularly where the associated sulfides have been subjected to weathering and leaching resulting in the formation of limonite. Gold grains with a maximum dimension of 2 mm were reported. Pyrite is the dominant sulfide phase within the quartz lodes (occurring as stringers and fracture fillings). Chalcopyrite, covellite, chalcocite, and galena are commonly observed in the mineral assemblage.

== Climate ==
Attappadi RF in the southwest portion of Mannarghat Forest Division receives a high rainfall of 4700 mm (185 in). Moving eastward along the Attappadi valley towards Agali, the rainfall steadily decreases to a low of 900 mm.

== Administration ==
=== Taluk administration ===
Attappady tribal taluk comprises 6 revenue villages like Agali, Kallamala, Kottathara, Padavayal, Pudur and Sholayur. It is one of the seven taluks in the Palakkad district. The tehsildar of the attappady taluk is the chief executive officer of the taluk.

=== Panchayats ===
The Attappady Block Panchayat and the Grama Panchayats of Agali, Sholayur, and Pudur are the local governments responsible for the development of the Attappady region. Attappady Block Panchayat is divided into 14 wards; Agali Grama Panchayat into 21 wards; Sholayur Panchayat into 14 wards; and Pudur Panchayat into 14 wards, with each ward represented by an elected member. These panchayats are headed by elected presidents and vice presidents.

The Attappady Division of the Palakkad District Panchayat covers the Attappady region and is represented by an elected member.

=== Police ===
There are three police stations in the Attappady region: Agali Police Station, Sholayur Police Station, and Pudur Police Station. These stations come under the Agali Subdivision of the Palakkad District Police.

The office of the Deputy Superintendent of Police (Agali) is the head of the Agali Subdivision and is responsible for policing in the Attappady region.

== Demographics ==
As of the 2011 census report, Attappadi taluk/Attappadi CD Block had a total population of 64,318 where 32,035 are males and 32,283 are females. The total number of households was 16,865. The population of children in the age group of 0-6 was 7,009 (10.9%) among which 3,551 are boys and 3,458 are girls.

The total number of literates in Attappadi was 43,021 with an overall literacy rate of 75% which is lower than the state average of 94%. Male literacy stands at 80.2% and Female literacy at 70%. Attappadi taluk/CD Block had scheduled tribal population of 27,627 (43% of total population) where 13,708 were males and 13,919 were females.

The tribal population of the valley is mostly Muduga, Irula, Kurumba tribal people and a section of settlers from Other Districts of Kerala.

There are mainly three Communities of tribes living in Attappadi they are Irulas, Mudugas, and Kurumbas.

== Infrastructure ==
The local governments of Attappadi are the Agali, Pudur, and Sholayur Grama Panchayats.

=== Education ===
Only one government school in Agali is having the facilities of a fully equipped education center. A college of applied sciences (IHRD College) was started in Agali, in the year 2010 for higher education. Govt. College Attappadi is the first Arts and Science College in the Attappadi region established under the Govt. sector in 2012.

== Notable people ==
- P. R. G. Mathur
- Nanjiyamma
- Pazhani Swami

== See also ==
- Irula Nritham
