= Mannarkkad Assembly constituency =

Constituency of the Kerala legislative assembly in India

Mannarkkad
- Constituency No. 54 for the Kerala Legislative Assembly

Constituency details
- Country: India
- Region: South India
- State: Kerala
- District: Palakkad
- Established: 1957
- Total electors: 1,68,781 (2026)
- Reservation: None

Member of Legislative Assembly
- 16th Kerala Legislative Assembly
- Incumbent N. Samsudheen
- Party: IUML
- Alliance: UDF
- Elected year: 2026

Mannarkkad is one of the 140 state legislative assembly constituencies in Kerala in southern India. It is also one of the seven state legislative assembly constituencies included in Palakkad Lok Sabha constituency. As of the 2026 Assembly elections, the current MLA is N. Samsudheen of IUML.

== Local self-governed segments ==
Mannarkkad Assembly constituency is composed of the following local self-governed segments:

Mannarkkad Assembly constituency

| Sl no. | Name | Status (Grama panchayat/Municipality) | Taluk |
|---|---|---|---|
| 1 | Mannarkkad | Municipality | Mannarkkad |
| 2 | Agali | Grama panchayat | Mannarkkad |
| 3 | Alanallur | Grama panchayat | Mannarkkad |
| 4 | Kottoppadam | Grama panchayat | Mannarkkad |
| 5 | Kumaramputhur | Grama panchayat | Mannarkkad |
| 6 | Thenkara | Grama panchayat | Mannarkkad |
| 7 | Pudur | Grama panchayat | Mannarkkad |
| 8 | Sholayur | Grama panchayat | Mannarkkad |

== Members of Legislative Assembly ==
The following list contains all members of Kerala Legislative Assembly who have represented Mannarkkad Assembly constituency during the period of various assemblies:

| Election | Name | Party |
|---|---|---|
| 1957 | Kongasseri Krishnan | Communist Party of India |
| 1960 | Kongasseri Krishnan | Communist Party of India |
| 1967 | E. K. Imbichi Bava | Communist Party of India |
| 1970 | John Manforan | Communist Party of India |
| 1977 | A. N. Yusuff | Communist Party of India |
| 1980 | A. P. Hamza | Indian Union Muslim League |
| 1982 | P. Kumaran | Communist Party of India |
| 1987 | Kalladi Mohammed | Indian Union Muslim League |
| 1991 | Kalladi Mohammed | Indian Union Muslim League |
| 1996 | Jose Baby | Communist Party of India |
| 2001 | Kalathil Abdulla | Indian Union Muslim League |
| 2006 | Jose Baby | Communist Party of India |
| 2011 | N. Samsudheen | Indian Union Muslim League |
| 2016 | N. Samsudheen | Indian Union Muslim League |
| 2021 | N. Samsudheen | Indian Union Muslim League |
| 2026 | N. Samsudheen | Indian Union Muslim League |

== Election results ==
Percentage change (±%) denotes the change in the number of votes from the immediate previous election.

=== 2026 ===
2026 Kerala Legislative Assembly election: Mannarkkad
| Party | Candidate | Votes | % | ±% |
|---|---|---|---|---|
| IUML | N. Samsudheen | 90,606 | 53.68 | ▲6.57 |
| CPI | Aboobacker Manzil | 64,703 | 38.34 | ▼4.91 |
| BDJS | Issac Varghese | 10,671 | 6.32 | ▼0.50 |
| SDPI | Asitha Najeeb | 939 | 0.56 | |
| Independent | Shamsudheen S/o Muhammed | 358 | 0.21 | |
| Independent | Aboobacker | 289 | 0.17 | |
| Independent | Shamsudheen S/o Ummer | 257 | 0.15 | |
| NOTA | None of the above | 958 | 0.57 | ▲0.07 |
| Margin of victory | | 25,906 | 15.34 | ▲11.48 |
| Turnout | | 1,68,781 | | |
| IUML hold | | Swing | ▲6.57 | |

Mannarkkad Assembly Constituency Election 2026 – Panchayat/Municipality-wise Lead
| Panchayat / Municipality | Leading Party | Lead (Votes) |
|---|---|---|
| Alanallur | UDF | 7346 |
| Kottopadam | UDF | 6963 |
| Kumaramputhur | UDF | 2951 |
| Mannarkkad | UDF | 4940 |
| Thenkara | UDF | 1364 |
| Sholayur | UDF | 910 |
| Puthur | UDF | 779 |
| Agali | UDF | 650 |

=== 2021 ===
2021 Kerala Legislative Assembly election: Mannarkkad
| Party | Candidate | Votes | % | ±% |
|---|---|---|---|---|
| IUML | N. Samsudheen | 71,657 | 47.11 | |
| CPI | K. P. Suresh Raj | 65,787 | 43.25 | |
| AIADMK | Agali Naseema P. | 10,376 | 6.82 | |
| Independent | James Mash | 988 | 0.65 | |
| BSP | Sivadasan | 827 | 0.54 | |
| NOTA | None of the above | 760 | 0.50 | |
| Independent | Shamsudeen Hamza | 511 | 0.34 | |
| Independent | Suresh | 440 | 0.29 | |
| Independent | Suresh Babu | 304 | 0.20 | |
| Independent | Shamsudeen Yusaf | 192 | 0.13 | |
| Independent | Ajikumar | 159 | 0.10 | |
| Independent | Shibu George | 101 | 0.07 | |
| Margin of victory | | 5,870 | 3.86 | |
| Turnout | | 1,52,102 | 76.73 | |
| IUML hold | | Swing | | |

=== 2016 ===
There were 1,89,455 registered voters in Mannarkkad Assembly constituency for the 2016 Kerala Assembly election.

2016 Kerala Legislative Assembly election: Mannarkkad
| Party | Candidate | Votes | % | ±% |
|---|---|---|---|---|
| IUML | N. Samsudheen | 73,163 | 49.27% | ▼0.29 |
| CPI | K. P. Suresh Raj | 60,838 | 40.97% | ▼1.87 |
| BDJS | Kesavadev Puthumanna | 10,170 | 6.85% | ▲2.18 |
| WPOI | M. Sulaiman | 1,112 | 0.75% | − |
| NOTA | None of the above | 927 | 0.62% | − |
| Independent | Shamsudheen Thottassery | 622 | 0.42% | − |
| CPI(ML) Red Star | Ajikumar K. | 478 | 0.32% | − |
| Independent | George Kutty E. V. | 445 | 0.30% | − |
| SDPI | A. Yoosaf Alanalloor | 412 | 0.28% | ▼0.74 |
| SS | Suresh Babu M. | 331 | 0.22% | − |
| Margin of victory | | 12,325 | 8.30% | ▲1.48 |
| Turnout | | 1,48,498 | 78.38% | ▲5.49 |
| IUML hold | | Swing | ▼0.29 | |

=== 2011 ===
There were 1,66,275 registered voters in the constituency for the 2011 election.

2011 Kerala Legislative Assembly election: Mannarkkad
| Party | Candidate | Votes | % | ±% |
|---|---|---|---|---|
| IUML | N. Samsudheen | 60,191 | 49.66% | |
| CPI | V. Chamunni | 51,921 | 42.84% | |
| BJP | O. P. Vasudevanunni | 5,655 | 4.67% | |
| SDPI | Muhammed Gafoor Madani | 1,238 | 1.02% | |
| BSP | Ramakrishnan A. | 820 | 0.68% | |
| Margin of victory | | 8,270 | 6.82% | |
| Turnout | | 1,21,195 | 72.89% | |
| IUML gain from CPI | | Swing | | |

=== 1952 ===
1952 Madras Legislative Assembly election: Mannarghat
| Party | Candidate | Votes | % | ±% |
|---|---|---|---|---|
| Independent | K. C. Gopalanunni | 15,726 | 38.79% | |
| Independent | Kurikal Ahamed | 9,512 | 23.46% | |
| INC | K. Gopalakrishna Nair | 8,995 | 22.19% | 22.19% |
| Independent | K. P. V. Eswaravarier | 6,310 | 15.56% | |
| Margin of victory | | 6,214 | 15.33% | |
| Turnout | | 40,543 | 50.11% | |
| Registered electors | | 80,910 | | |
| Independent win (new seat) | | | | |

== See also ==
- Mannarkkad
- Palakkad district
- List of constituencies of the Kerala Legislative Assembly
- 2016 Kerala Legislative Assembly election
