= Tachampara Gram Panchayat =

Local government

Thachampara is a gram panchayat in the Palakkad district, state of Kerala, India. It is a local government organisation that serves the villages of Karimba-I, (Note: Karimba-I was allocated the census code of 627621 in 2011 and appears under the Karimba gram panchayat also.) Karakurissi, (Note: Karakurissi was allocated the census code of 627623 in 2011 and appears under its own gram panchayat also.) Pottassery-II and Tachampara.
