= Pottassery =

Pottassery may refer to

- Pottassery-I, a village in Kozhikode_district, Kerala, India
- Pottassery-II, a village in Palakkad_district, Kerala, India
