= 12th Kerala Assembly =

2006–2011 Kerala Assembly term

←	11th	13th	→

Overview
- Legislative body: Kerala Legislative Assembly
- Term: 13 May 2006 – 14 May 2011
- Election: 2006 Kerala Legislative Assembly election
- Government: Achuthanandan ministry
- Opposition: UDF
- Members: 140
- Speaker: K. Radhakrishnan
- Deputy Speaker: Jose Baby
- Leader of the House: V. S. Achuthanandan
- Leader of the Opposition: Oommen Chandy
- Party control: LDF

The 12th Assembly of Kerala was elected in the 2006 Kerala Legislative Assembly election. The Speaker of the assembly was K. Radhakrishnan. The Deputy Speaker was Jose Baby from the Communist Party of India. The leader of the Assembly was V. S. Achuthanandan from the Communist Party of India (Marxist). The leader of opposition was Oommen Chandy of the Indian National Congress. The Assembly had 17 sessions with 253 days of sittings. A total of 139 bills were passed during this period.

== Members ==
No.	Constituency	Name	Party
1	Manjeshwar	C. H. Kunhambu	CPI(M)
2	Kasaragod	C.T Ahamedali	IUML
3	Udma	K.V Kunhiraman	CPI(M)
4	Hosdrug (SC)	Pallipram Balan	CPI
5	Trikkarpur	Kunhiraman K	CPI(M)
6	Irikkur	K.C Joseph	INC
7	Payyanur	P.K Sreemathi	CPI(M)
8	Taliparamba	C.K.P Padmanabhan	CPI(M)
9	Azhikode	M. Prakashan	CPI(M)
10	Cannanore	K. Sudhakaran	INC
11	Edakkad	Kadanappally Ramachandran	C(S)
12	Tellicherry	Kodiyeri Balakrishnan	CPI(M)
13	Peringalam	K.P Mohanan	JD(S)
14	Kuthuparamba	P. Jayarajan	CPI(M)
15	Peravoor	K.K Shylaja	CPI(M)
16	North Wynad (ST)	K.C Kunhiraman	CPI(M)
17	Badagara	M.K Premnath	JD(S)
18	Nadapuram	Binoy Viswam	CPI
19	Meppayur	K.K Lathika	CPI(M)
20	Quilandy	P. Viswan	CPI(M)
21	Perambra	K. Kunhammed	CPI(M)
22	Balusseri	A.K Saseendran	NCP
23	Koduvally	P.T.A Rahim	IND
24	Calicut-I	A. Pradeep Kumar	CPI(M)
25	Calicut-II	P.M.A Salam	INL
26	Beypore	Elamaram Kareem	CPI(M)
27	Kunnamangalam (SC)	U.C Raman	IND
28	Thiruvambady	Mathayi Chacko	CPI(M)
29	Kalpetta	M.V Sreyams Kumar	JD(S)
30	Sulthan's Battery	P. Krishna Prasad	CPI(M)
31	Wandoor (SC)	A.P Anilkumar	INC
32	Nilambur	Aryadan Muhammed	INC
33	Manjeri	P.K Abdu Rabb	IUML
34	Malappuram	M. Ummer	IUML
35	Kondotty	K. Muhammadunni Haji	IUML
36	Tirurangadi	Kutty Ahammed Kutty	IUML
37	Tanur	Abdurahiman Randathani	IUML
38	Tirur	P.P Abdullakkutty	CPI(M)
39	Ponnani	Paloli Mohamedkutty	CPI(M)
40	Kuttipuram	K.T Jaleel	IND
41	Mankada	Manjalamkuzhi Ali	IND
42	Perinthalmanna	Sasi Kumar	CPI(M)
43	Thrithala (SC)	T.P Kunjunni	CPI(M)
44	Pattambi	C.P Mohammed	INC
45	Ottapalam	M. Hamsa	CPI(M)
46	Sreekrishnapuram	K.S Saleekha	CPI(M)
47	Mannarkkad	Jose Baby	CPI
48	Malampuzha	V.S Achuthanandan	CPI(M)
49	Palghat	K.K Divakaran	CPI(M)
50	Chittur	K. Achuthan	INC
51	Kollengode	V. Chenthamarakshan	CPI(M)
52	Coyalmannam (SC)	A.K Balan	CPI(M)
53	Alathur	M. Chandhran	CPI(M)
54	Chelakkara (SC)	K. Radhakrishnan	CPI(M)
55	Wadakkancherry	A.C Moideen	CPI(M)
56	Kunnamkulam	Babu M. Palissery	CPI(M)
57	Cherpu	V.S Sunilkumar	CPI
58	Trichur	Therambil Ramakrishnan	INC
59	Ollur	Rajaji Mathew Thomas	CPI
60	Kodakara	C. Raveendranath	CPI(M)
61	Chalakudi	B.D Devassy	CPI(M)
62	Mala	A.K Chandran	CPI
63	Irinjalakuda	Thomas Unniyadan	KEC(M)
64	Manalur	Murali Perunelli	CPI(M)
65	Guruvayoor	K.V Abdul Khader	CPI(M)
66	Nattika	T.N Prathapan	INC
67	Kodungallur	K.P Rajendran	CPI
68	Ankamaly	Jose Thettayil	JD(S)
69	Vadakkekara	S. Sharma	CPI(M)
70	Parur	V.D Satheesan	INC
71	Narakal (SC)	M.K Purushothaman	CPI(M)
72	Ernakulam	K.V Thomas	INC
73	Mattancherry	V.K Ibrahim Kunju	IUML
74	Palluruthy	C.M Dinesh Mani	CPI(M)
75	Trippunithura	K. Babu	INC
76	Alwaye	A.M Yousuf	CPI(M)
77	Perumbavoor	Saju Paul	CPI(M)
78	Kunnathunad	M.M Monayi	CPI(M)
79	Piravom	M.J Jacob	CPI(M)
80	Muvattupuzha	Babu Paul	CPI
81	Kothamangalam	T.U Kuruvila	KEC
82	Thodupuzha	P.J Joseph	KEC
83	Devicolam (SC)	S. Rajendran	CPI(M)
84	Idukki	Roshy Augustine	KEC(M)
88	Udumbanchola	K.K Jayachandran	CPI(M)
86	Peermade	E.S Bijimol	CPI
87	Kanjirappally	Alphons Kannanthanam	IND
88	Vazhoor	Jayarajan	KEC(M)
89	Changanacherry	C.F Thomas	KEC(M)
90	Kottayam	V.N Vasavan	CPI(M)
91	Ettumanoor	Thomas Chazhikkadan	KEC(M)
92	Puthuppally	Oommen Chandy	INC
93	Poonjar	P.C George	KC(S)
94	Palai	K.M Mani	KEC(M)
95	Kaduthuruthy	Mons Joseph	KEC
96	Vaikom (SC)	K. Ajith	CPI
97	Aroor	A.M Ariff	CPI(M)
98	Sherthalai	P. Thilothaman	CPI
99	Mararikulam	Thomas Isaac	CPI(M)
100	Alleppey	K.C Venugopal	INC
101	Ambalapuzha	G. Sudhakaran	CPI(M)
102	Kuttanad	Thomas Chandy	DIC
103	Haripad	B. Babuprasad	INC
104	Kayamkulam	C.K Sadasivan	CPI(M)
105	Thiruvalla	Mathew T. Thomas	JD(S)
106	Kallooppara	Joseph M. Puthusseri	KEC(M)
107	Aranmula	K.C Rajagopalan	CPI(M)
108	Chengannur	P.C Vishnunath	INC
109	Mavelikara	M. Murali	INC
110	Pandalam (SC)	K.K Shaju	JPSS
111	Ranni	Raju Abraham	CPI(M)
112	Pathanamthitta	K. Sivadasan Nair	INC
113	Konni	Adoor Prakash	INC
114	Pathanapuram	K.B Ganesh Kumar	KEC(B)
115	Punaloor	K. Raju	CPI
116	Chadayamangalam	Mullakkara Rathnakaran	CPI
117	Kottarakkara	Aisha Potti	CPI(M)
118	Neduvathur (SC)	B. Raghavan	CPI(M)
119	Adoor	Thiruvanchoor Radhakrishnan	INC
120	Kunnathur (SC)	Kovoor Kunjumon	RSP
121	Karunagapally	C. Divakaran	CPI
122	Chavara	N.K Premachandran	RSP
123	Kundara	M.A Baby	CPI(M)
124	Quilon	P.K Gurudasan	CPI(M)
125	Eravipuram	A.A Azeez	RSP
126	Chathanoor	N. Anirudhan	CPI
127	Varkala	Varkala Kahar	INC
128	Attingal	Ananthalavattom Anandan	CPI(M)
129	Kilimanoor (SC)	N. Rajan	CPI
130	Vamanapuram	J. Arundhathi	CPI(M)
131	Ariyanad	G. Karthikeyan Aryanad	INC
132	Nedumangad	Mankode Radhakrishnan	CPI
133	Kazhakuttam	M.A Vahid	INC
134	Trivandrum North	M. Vijayakumar	CPI(M)
135	Trivandrum West	V. Surendran Pillai	KEC
136	Trivandrum East	V. Sivankutty	CPI(M)
137	Nemom	N. Sakthan	INC
138	Kovalam	George Mercier	INC
139	Neyyattinkara	V.J Thankappan	CPI(M)
140	Parassala	R. Selvaraj	CPI(M)

=== Nominated member ===
A single seat in the Kerala Legislative Assembly was reserved for the members of the Anglo-Indian community by the Governor of Kerala on the advice of the Government of Kerala. The member nominated in this assembly was Simon Britto Rodrigues.

== See also ==
- Achuthanandan ministry
