= Kottoppadam =

Kottoppadam or Kottappadam may refer to:

- Kottoppadam-I, a village in Palakkad district, Kerala, India
- Kottoppadam-II, a village in Palakkad district, Kerala, India
- Kottoppadam-III, a village in Palakkad district, Kerala, India
- Kottappadam (gram panchayat), a gram panchayat serving the above villages
