= Sholayur (disambiguation) =

Sholayur or Sholayar may refer to

- Sholayur, a village in Palakkad district, state of Kerala, India
- Sholayar (gram panchayat), a gram panchayat serving the above village and others
