= Mudha Mooppan =

Indian centenarian

Mudha Mooppan was the head of a clan of Kurumba, a primitive tribe living in the hamlet of Attappadi, Kerala, India. Prior to heading the clan in Attapaddi, Mudha Moopan had been headman in the hamlet of Anavai for over 50 years.

He was a well-known tribal medical practitioner who had learned his craft from his father. A 1994 report by the UNESCO-affiliated International Committee on Urgent Anthropological and Ethnological Research described him as an encyclopaedia of medicinal plants.

In 2002, when his clan consisted of 108 members, he claimed to be 118 years old and to have had 16 marriages involving women from his tribe and also the Muduga and Malayar tribes. Anthropologists believed his age to be 108 and news stories generally varied in their statement of his age. He was still living in February 2004, when he launched the Rashtriya Mahasabha, a coalition of Adivasi and Dalit groups, while protesting the incursion of non-tribal members who he claimed were deforesting the land upon which his tribe relied.
