= Nenmini =

Nenmini Nenmini Desam
- village
- Location in Kerala, India Nenmini (India)
- Coordinates: 11°3′10″N 76°12′30″E
- Country: India
- State: Kerala
- District: Malappuram

Population (2011)
  - Total: 15,860

Languages
  - Official: Malayalam, English
- Time zone: UTC+5:30 (IST)
- PIN: 679325
- Vehicle registration: KL-53

Nenmini is a small village in Malappuram district in the state of Kerala, India.The Nenmini region is made up of 5 regions including Chemmanthatta, Thachinganadam, Nenmini, Nallur and Kondiparamba.

== Demographics ==
As of 2011 India census, Nenmini had a population of 15860 with 7589 males and 8271 females.

Nenmini is situated in Perinthalmanna Taluk and located in Keezhattur village of Malappuram district.

== Languages ==
Like in other parts of Kerala, Malayalam is the spoken language in Nenmini Village

== Transportation ==
Nenmini village connects Manjeri town and Pandikkad to Perinthalmanna town.
