= Khatak Chincholi =

- village
- Location in Karnataka, India Khatak Chincholi (India)
- Coordinates: 18.03°N 77.22°E
- Country: India
- State: Karnataka
- District: Bidar
- Talukas: Bhalki

Population (2001)
  - Total: 6,647

Languages
  - Official: Kannada
- Time zone: UTC+5:30 (IST)

Khatak Chincholi is a village in the southern state of Karnataka, India. It is located in the Bhalki taluk of Bidar district in Karnataka. A famous 12th-century historical temple located in the village is Hulakunti Math, dedicated to Shree Shantalingeshwara, as the main deity.

The Hulakunti Jatra (village festival) happens every year of Shravan Masa (July- August Month) middle Monday where Karnataka, Andhra Pradesh and Maharashtra devotees participate for the famous festival.

Other places of worship include the Shree Veermahanteshwar math and Shree Kottrappa swamy Parwathmath temple.

Mallikarjun mutya gaduuge " />

== See also ==
- Bidar
- Districts of Karnataka
