= Karuvarakundu =

Town in Kerala, India

Karuvarakundu Cherumbu Desam
- Semi Urban Area
- Karuvarakundu
- Nickname: Tourism Hub of Malappuram District
- Location in Kerala, India Karuvarakundu (India)
- Coordinates: 11°7′10.22″N 76°20′31.526″E
- Country: India
- State: Kerala
- District: Malappuram

Area
  - Total: 64.20 km^{2} (24.79 sq mi)

Population (2001)
  - Total: 44,434
  - Density: 692.1/km^{2} (1,793/sq mi)

Languages
  - Official: Malayalam
- Time zone: UTC+5:30 (IST)
- PIN: 676523
- Telephone code: 04931
- Vehicle registration: KL-71, KL-10.
- Lok Sabha constituency: Wayanad
- Vidhan Sabha constituency: Wandoor
- Climate: 15 to 40 C (Köppen)
- Website: karuvarakundu.in

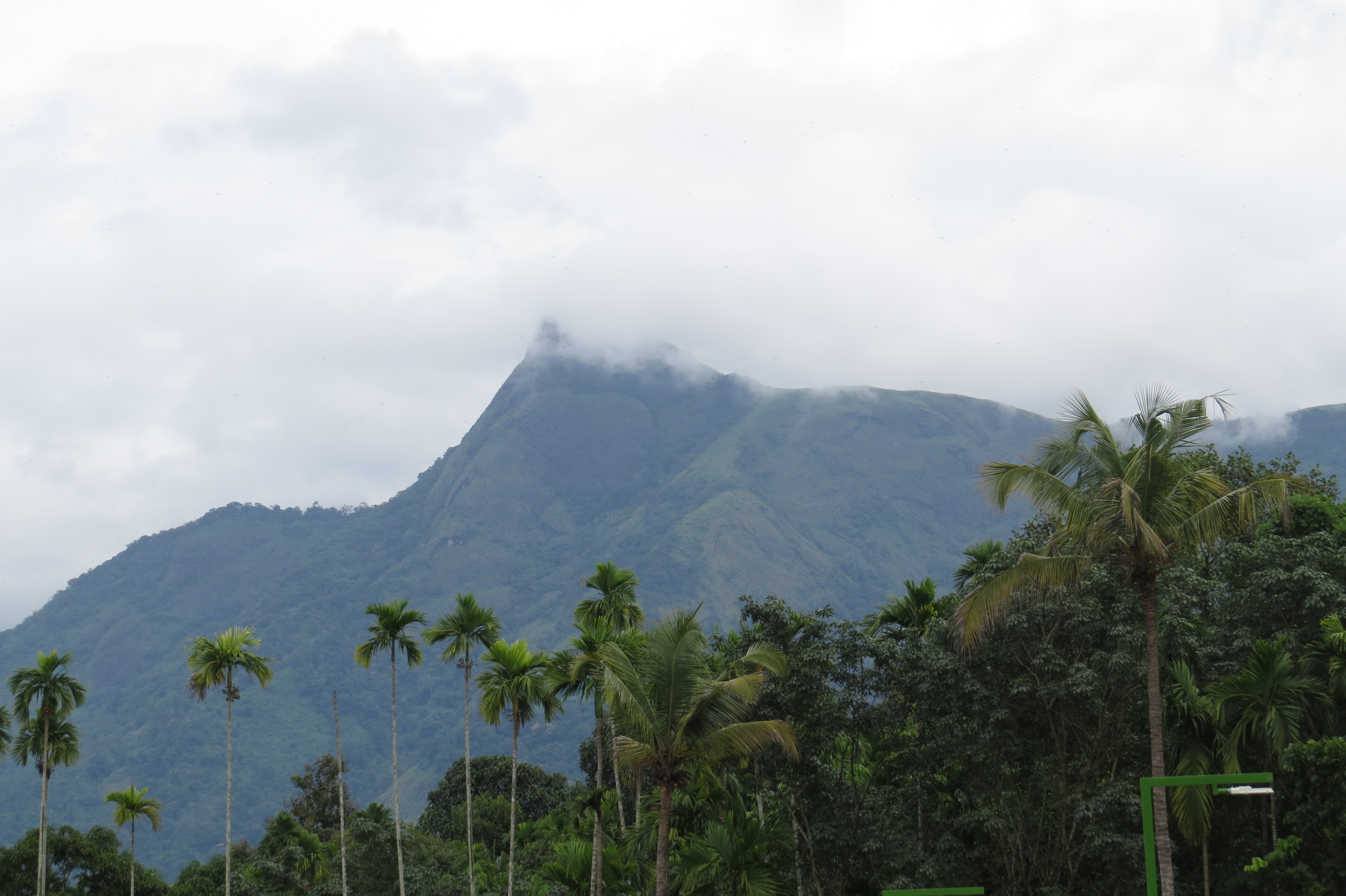
Silent Valley National Park (Koomban Mala) view from Karuvarakundu

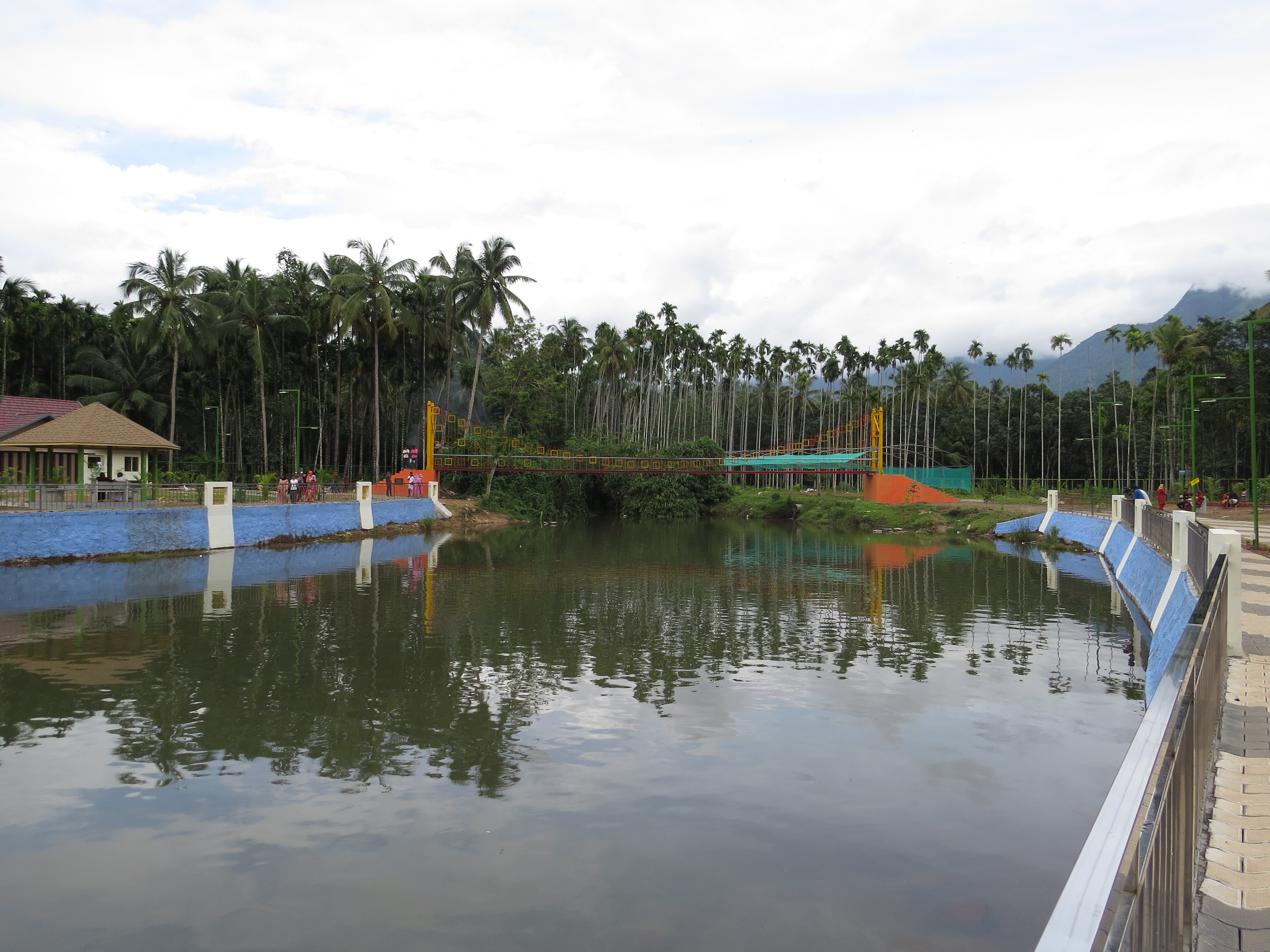
Cherumb eco tourism village, Karuvarakundu

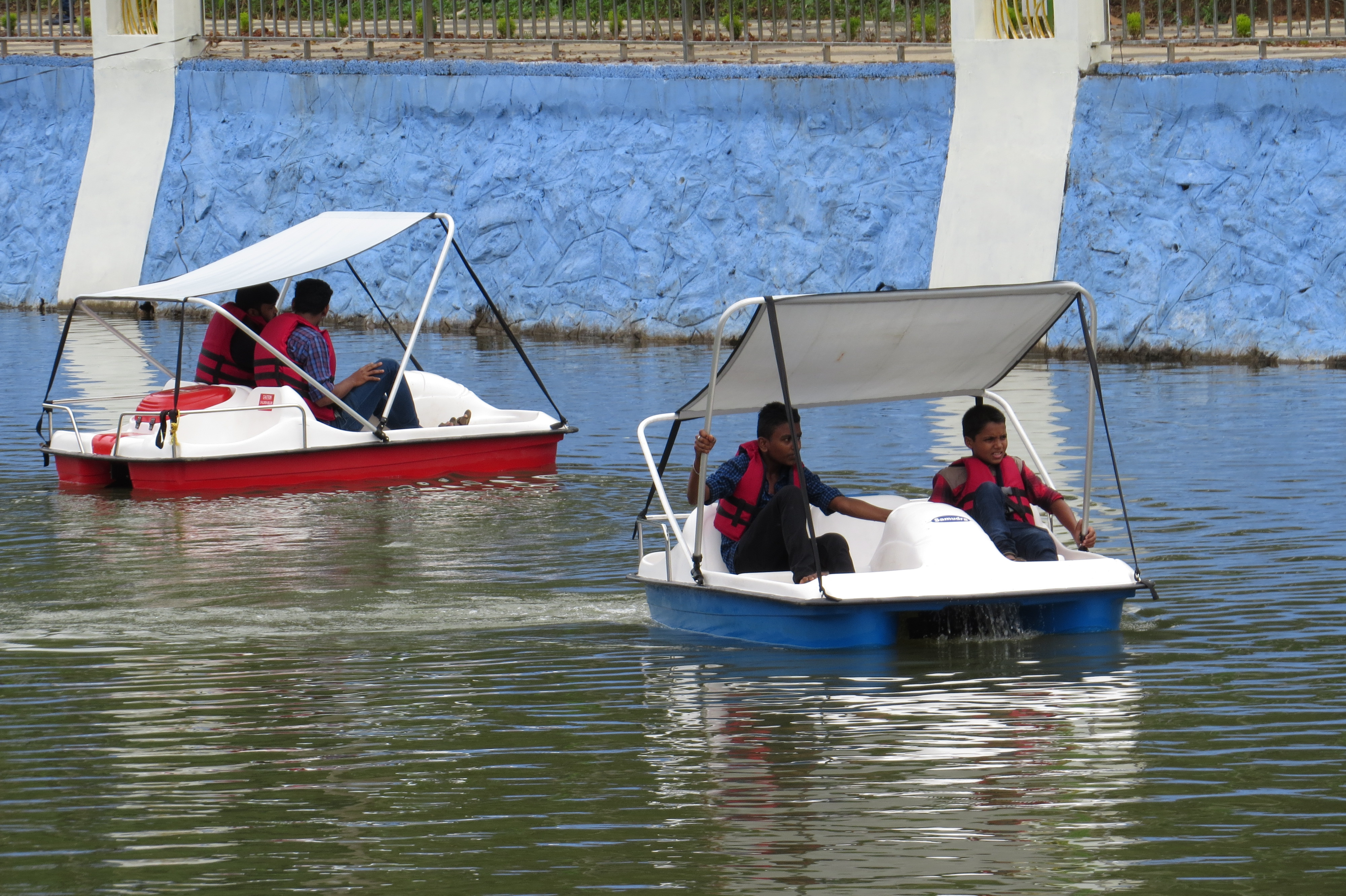
Cherumb eco tourism village, Karuvarakundu

Karuvarakundu is a semi-urban area in the eastern part of Malappuram district, Kerala, India. It is situated 32 kilometres (20 mi) east of Manjeri, 26 kilometres (16 mi) northeast of Perinthalmanna and 30 km southeast of Nilambur. The Olippuzha River, a tributary of the Kadalundipuzha, flows through the town. Karuvarakundu is close to the Western Ghats and hence prone to landslides.

The name Karuvarakundu means place of the blacksmith, indicating the town's history as a metalworking centre. It is known as t

There are many tea and rubber plantations in and around Karuvarakundu. The town is an educational centre of eastern Eranad, with a total of 20 schools and 5 colleges.

Karuvarakundu is part of the setting of the novel Arabi Ponnu, by M. T. Vasudevan Nair and N. P. Mohammed.

== History ==
"Karu" means iron ore. The place where iron ore was excavated came to be known as Karu varum kundu, later shortened to Karuvarakundu. Swords and utensils made of iron were made here two thousand years ago, and exported to countries like Egypt, Rome, and Denmark. The people engaged in iron ore mining took the family name Aripanikkar. Karuvarakundu is known as the Jamshedpur of south India because of its extensive mining history.

The Malabar rebellion of 1921 led to riots in Karuvarakundu. On 20 August 1921 the news that the British had fired at a mosque in Tirurangadi spread in Karuvarakundu, and protests against the British began. On the next day, a mob attacked the police station and seized weapons, leaving the police station and the tourist Bungalow on fire. The British army subsequently came to Karuvarakundu to suppress the rioters. The army barracks were first situated at Chembankunnu and later moved to Cambinkunnu, the current location of the Karuvarakundu Government Higher Secondary School.

== Geography ==
Karuvarakundu is located on a sloping region near a forest. The mountains of the Western Ghats, which reach a height of 1250 metres above sea level, are located in the southeast of the Karuvarakundu Panchayath. The Olippuzha River, the longest river flowing through Karuvarakundu, originates in these mountains. The river Kallanpuzha, which also flows through Karuvarakundu, originates at a height of 1050m.

The Karuvarakundu Panchayath covers an area of 64.2 km^{2} and is part of the Nilambur subdivision of the Malappuram district. It is one of the main agricultural areas of the Malappuram district. It includes Kerala Estate and shares borders with Amarambalam and Puthur (Palakkad) in the north, Puthur Panchayath in the east, Alanallur in the south and Kalikavu, Tuvvur, and Chokkad in the west.

=== Suburbs and Villages ===
- Chengode Bridge, Eanadi and Arimanal Bridge
- Pulvetta, Tharish, Kalkundu, Kakkara villages
- Kerala Village, Punnakkad Junction
- Iringattiri Bridge, Puthanazhi.

=== Tourist attractions ===
- Keralamkundu Waterfalls
- Cherumb Eco Village
- Silent Valley National Park
- Anginda peak
- Thareeqath Dargah of late Hyderabadi saint
- Baroda waterfall
- Vattamala
- vattamala waterfall
- Madhari waterfall

=== Important landmarks ===
- Cherumbu Eco Village.
- Keralaamkundu Waterfalls.
- Govt. higher secondary school Karuvarakundu.
- Kalkundu Waterfalls.
- Kerala Estate.
- Baroda Waterfalls.
- Cordova College for Women Karuvarakundu.
- Shifa Acupuncture & Hijama Centre Maruthingal.
- Hayath Hospital Maruthingal.
- Alsalama Hospital.
- Kalakuthilamma Muthappan Temple.
- GHSS Karuvarakundu.
- GLPS Punnakkad.
- GLPS Pulvetta.
- GLPS Tharish.
- Nalanda College Angadi.
- Sri Neelaam Kurushi Ayyappa Temple.
- Darunnajaath Islamic Centre. (DNIC)
- Bhavanamparambu Siva-Vishnu Temple.
- Holy Family Forane Church.
- St. George Orthodox Church, Karuvarakundu.
- IPC Shalem Hall.

== Transportation ==
Karuvarakundu village is connected via road to the nearest towns, including Manjeri, Perinthalmanna and Nilambur. State Highway 39 (SH 39) between Perumbilavu and Nilambur passes through Karuvarakundu. It is also connected to National Highway No. 966, which connects Palakkad and Coimbatore. The nearest airport is at Karipur. The nearest railway stations are at Tuvvur and Melattur.
