= Karimba =

Karimba may refer to:

- Karimba, Palakkad, India
- Kaarimba, town in Victoria, Australia
- Karimba, an album by the Peruvian band Novalima
- A variation of the musical instrument Mbira
