= Chooriyode =

- Village
- Chooriyode
- Location within Kerala
- Country: India
- State: Kerala
- District: Palakkad
- Taluk: Mannarkad

Languages
  - Official: Malayalam, Tamil
- Time zone: UTC+5:30 (IST)

Chooriyode is a village in the Palakkad district of Kerala State, South India. The headquarters is Mannarkkad Taluk. It is situated 35 km northeast of the district headquarters Palakkad, on the way to Kozhikode National Highway 213 (NH-213) and in the foothills of the Western Ghats. Silent Valley (a tropical evergreen rain forest with an unbroken evolutionary history of 50 million years) is only 45 km from Chooriyode.

== Transportation ==
Chooriyode is 7 km from Mannarkkad in Kerala. Between the little town of Thachampara and Chirakkal Padi, Kanjirapuzha Dam and Park is only 10 km from Chooriyode Junction. Buses from Palakkad, Muthukurussi, Karakurussi, come to Chooriyode through Kanjirapuzha, Mannarkkad, Kozhikode, and Karipur airport, the distance is 80 km.

== People and Establishes ==
State level School student Choreographer- Appu Mash

General Engineers Architects - Noushad K

== tabernacle ==
Mostly Muslim, Hindu and Christian devotee are here.

== River ==
Chooriyode river is a tributary of the Bharathapuzha. A comprehensive study on fish diversity of Chooriyode river, the largest branch of west-flowing river in Kerala, found it as the richest in fish species among the chooriyode rivers. It recorded the presence of 117 species, with three species endemic to the river. Although the Kunthipuzha stream of the Thootha Puzha tributary flowing through the Silent Valley National Park had the lowest species richness (25 species), it has very high conservation value, as two endemic species — Balitora jalpally and Mesonoemacheilus remadevi — are restricted to this stream, highlighting the importance of protected areas such as Silent Valley in the conservation of endemic biodiversity, the study said.
