= Chembrassery =

- village
- Location in Kerala, India Chembrassery (India)
- Coordinates: 11.1242600°N 76.2582300°E
- Country: India
- State: Kerala
- District: Malappuram

Population (2011)
  - Total: 14,474

Languages
  - Official: Malayalam, English
- Time zone: UTC+5:30 (IST)
- PIN: 676521
- Vehicle registration: KL-10

Chembrassery is a village in Malappuram district in the state of Kerala, India.

== Demographics ==
As of 2011 India census, Chembrassery had a population of 14,474, with 6,828 males and 7,646 females.

== Transportation ==
Chembrassery village connects to other parts of India through Nilambur town. State Highway No.28 starts from Nilambur and connects to Ooty, Mysore and Bangalore through Highways.12,29 and 181. National highway No.66 passes through Ramanattukara and the northern stretch connects to Goa and Mumbai. The southern stretch connects to Cochin and Trivandrum. The nearest airport is at Karipur. The nearest major railway station is at Feroke.
