= Kottathara, Palakkad =

Village in Kerala, India

Kottathara
- village
- Location in Kerala, India
- Coordinates: 11.1315°N 76.6846°E
- Country: India
- State: Kerala
- District: Palakkad

Government
  - Body: Sholayur Grama Panchayat

Area
  - Total: 72.2 km^{2} (27.9 sq mi)

Population (2011)
  - Total: 10,195
  - Density: 141/km^{2} (366/sq mi)

Languages
  - Official: Malayalam, English
- Time zone: UTC+5:30 (IST)
- PIN: 6XXXXX
- Vehicle registration: KL-50

Kottathara is a village in the Sholayur Grama Panchayat of Palakkad district in Kerala, India. It was part of Mannarkkad taluk prior to the formation of Attappady taluk.

== Demographics ==
As of 2011 Census, Kottathara village had a population of 10,195 with 5,072 males and 5,123 females. Kottathara village has an area of 72.2 km^{2} (27.9 sq mi) with 2,790 families residing in it. 9.4% of the population was under 6 years of age. Kottathara had overall literacy of 70.9% lower than state average of 94%; male literacy was 76.6% and female literacy was 65.3%.
