= Tuvvur =

- Village
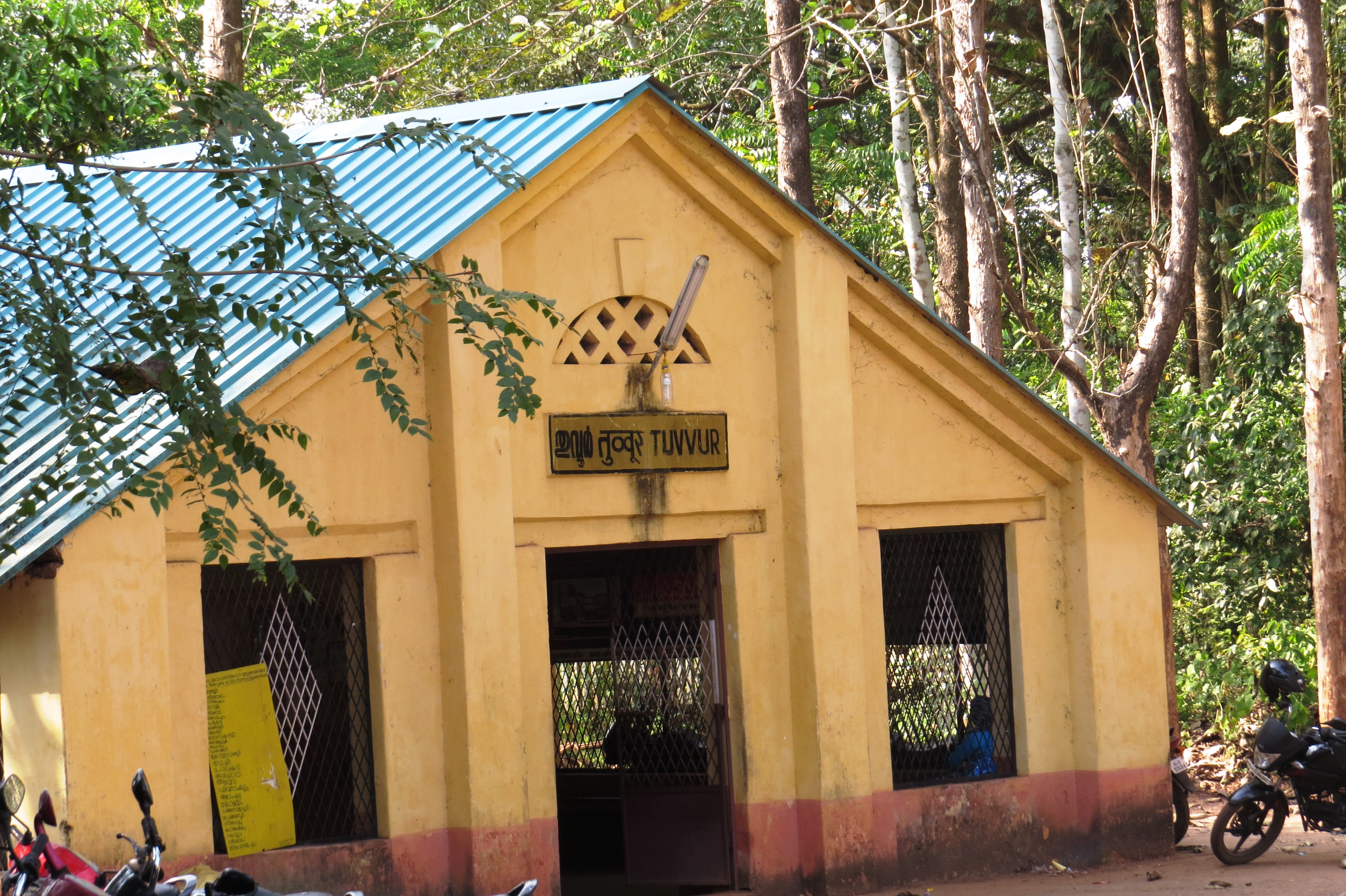
- Tuvvur Railway Station
- Interactive map of Tuvvur
- Coordinates: 11°6′47.396″N 76°17′9.273″E
- Country: India
- State: Kerala
- District: Malappuram

Population (2011)
  - Total: 29,991

Languages
  - Official: Malayalam, English
- Time zone: UTC+5:30 (IST)
- PIN: 679327
- Vehicle registration: KL-
- Website: WWW.Tuvvurinfo.blogspot.in

Tuvvur is a village in Malappuram district in the state of Kerala, India. This village has mosques, temples, churches and people of different religions are living in this village.

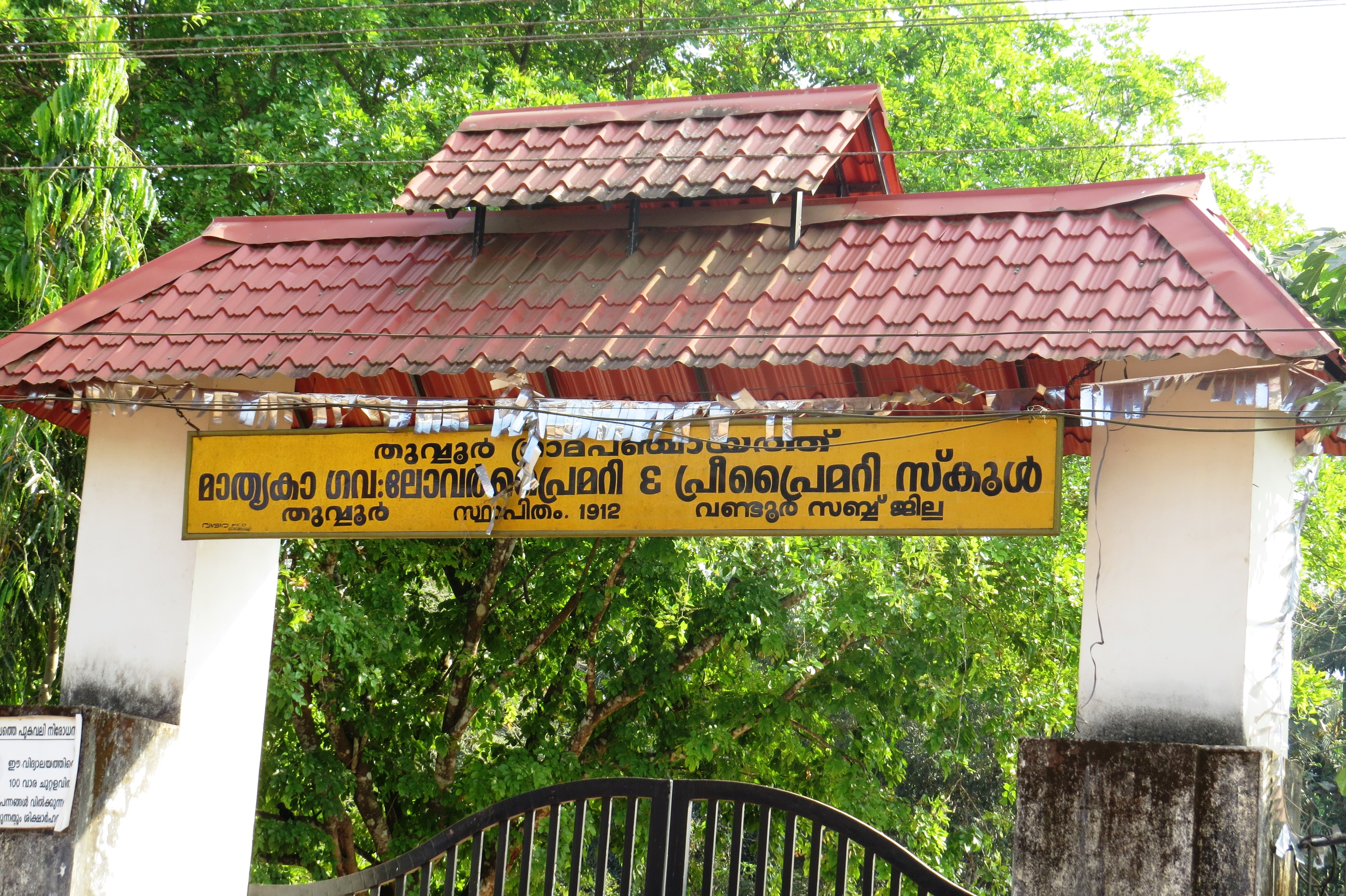
Model School, Tuvvur

== Demographics ==
As of 2011 India census, Tuvvur had a population of 29991 with 14237 males and 15754 females.

== Education ==
- Govt. Higher Secondary School, Tuvvur
- Govt. High School, Neelancheri
- Tharakkal AUP School, Tuvvur
- GLPS, Tuvvur
- GMLPS, Mampuzha
- GMLPS, Akkarakkulam
- GMLPS, Mundakkodu
- ALPS, Akkarappuram

== Transportation ==
Tuvvur village is connected to other parts of India by road and rail. Approximately six kilometers of State Highway 39 (SH 39) which runs between Perumbilavu and Nilambur, passes through Tuvvur. Additionally, Pandikkad, located on a State Highway 73 (SH 73) connecting Valanchery and Nilambur is about 9 km from Tuvvur. The nearest airport is in Kozhikode, and the closest railway station is Tuvvur on the Nilambur Road-Shoranur line.

== Image Gallery ==
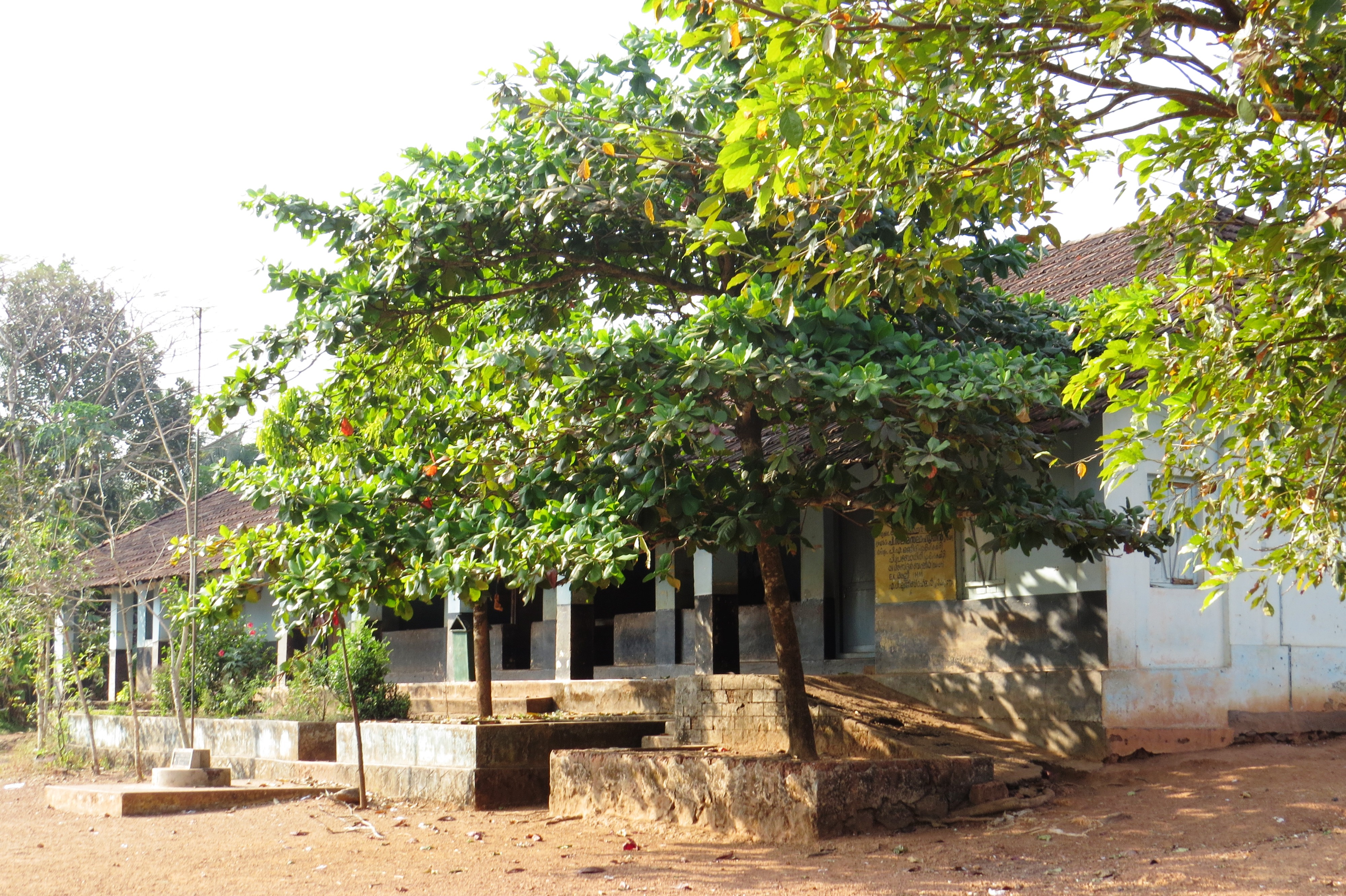
G.M.L.P. School, Mampuzha

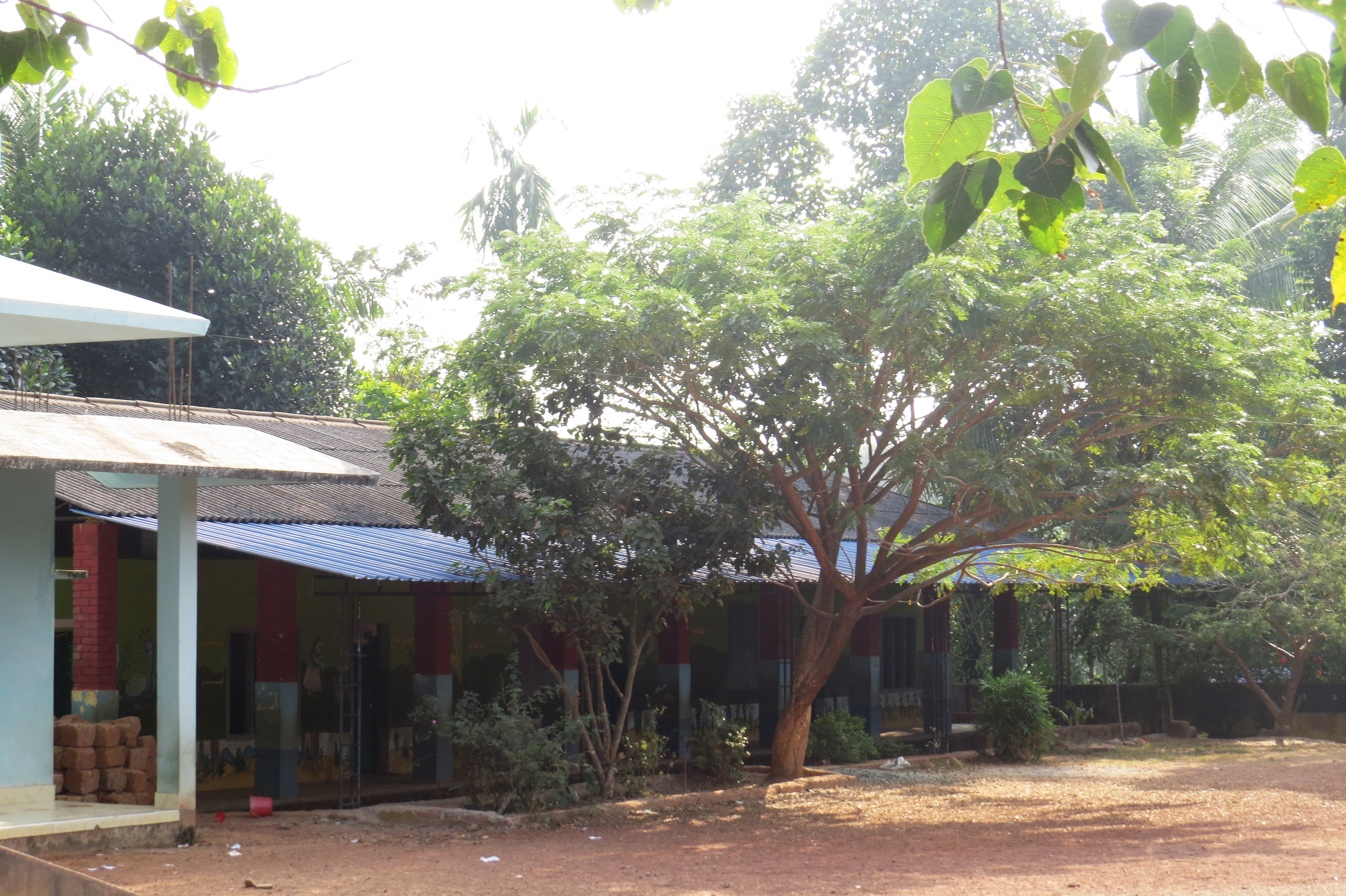
G.M.L.P. School Mampuzha

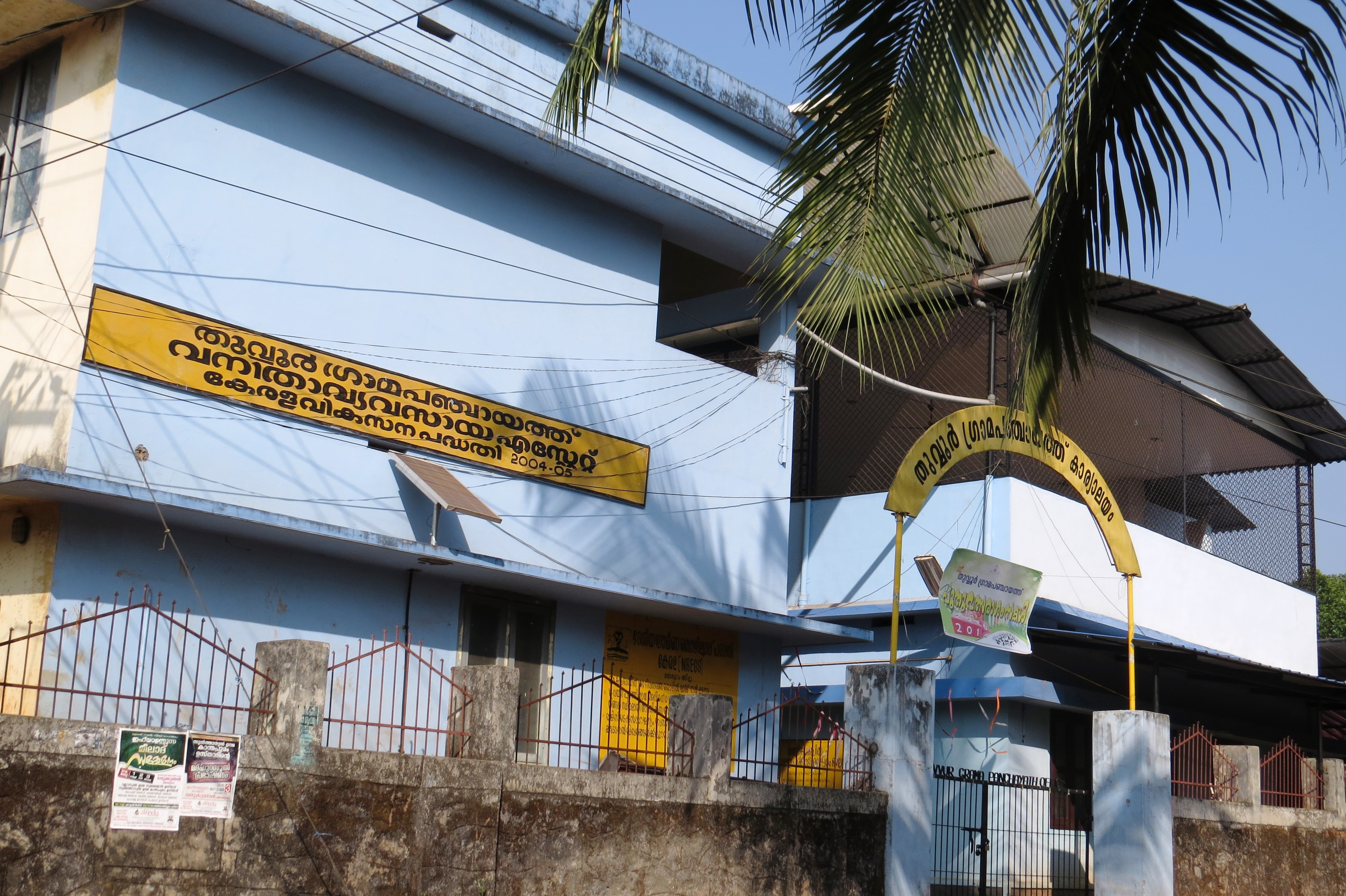
Tuvvur Grama Panchayath Office

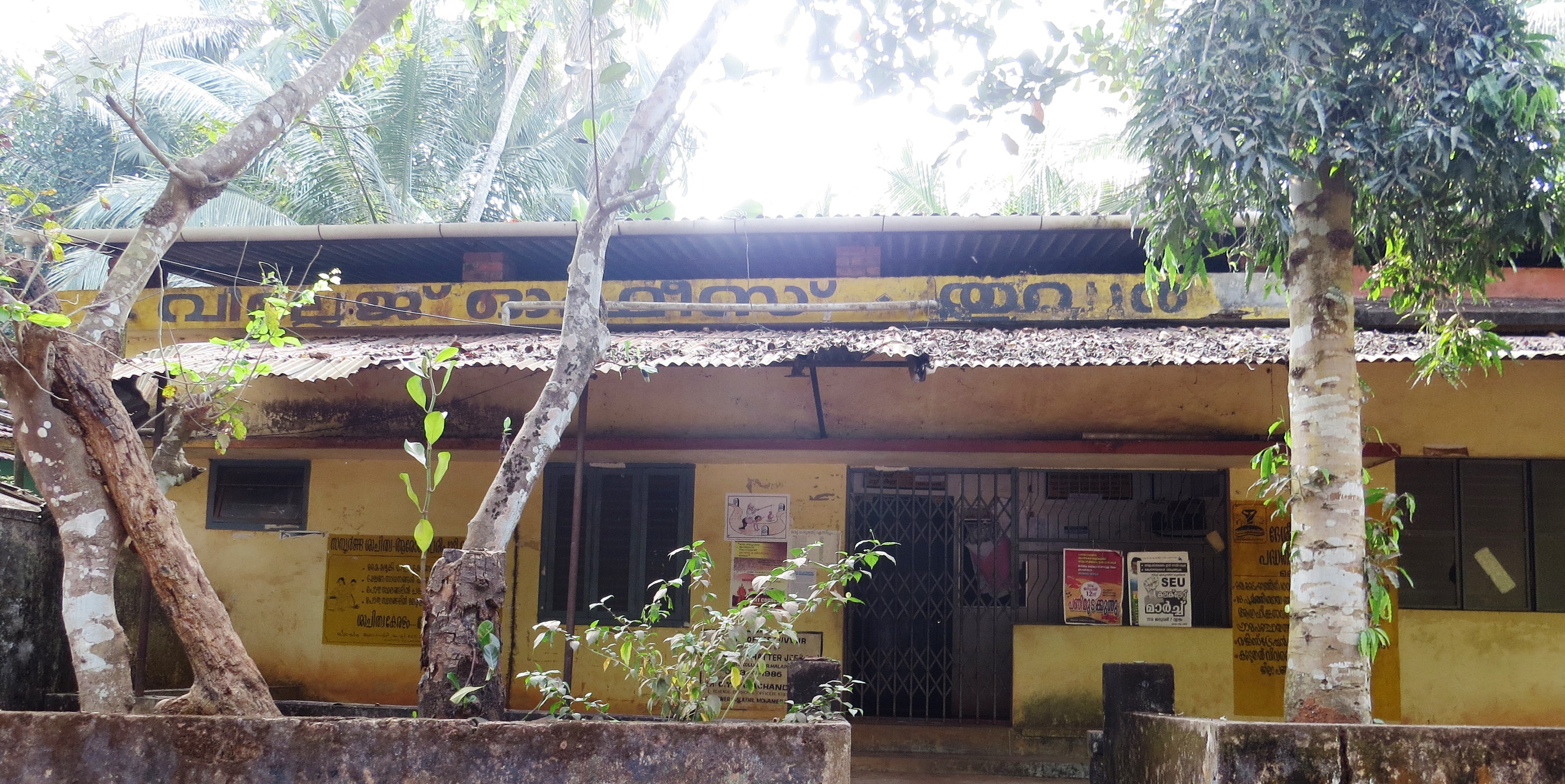
Village Office Tuvvur

For more images see:

- Insects of Tuvvur
