= Edathara =

- village
- Location within Kerala Location within India
- Coordinates: 10°47′20″N 76°34′30″E
- Country: India
- State: Kerala
- District: Palakkad

Languages
  - Official: Malayalam, English
- Time zone: UTC+5:30 (IST)
- PIN: 678611
- Vehicle registration: KL-09
- Nearest city: Palakkad
- Lok Sabha constituency: Palakkad

Edathara is a village in Parli Panchayat, Palakkad district, Kerala, India.
