= Kerala Estate =

- village
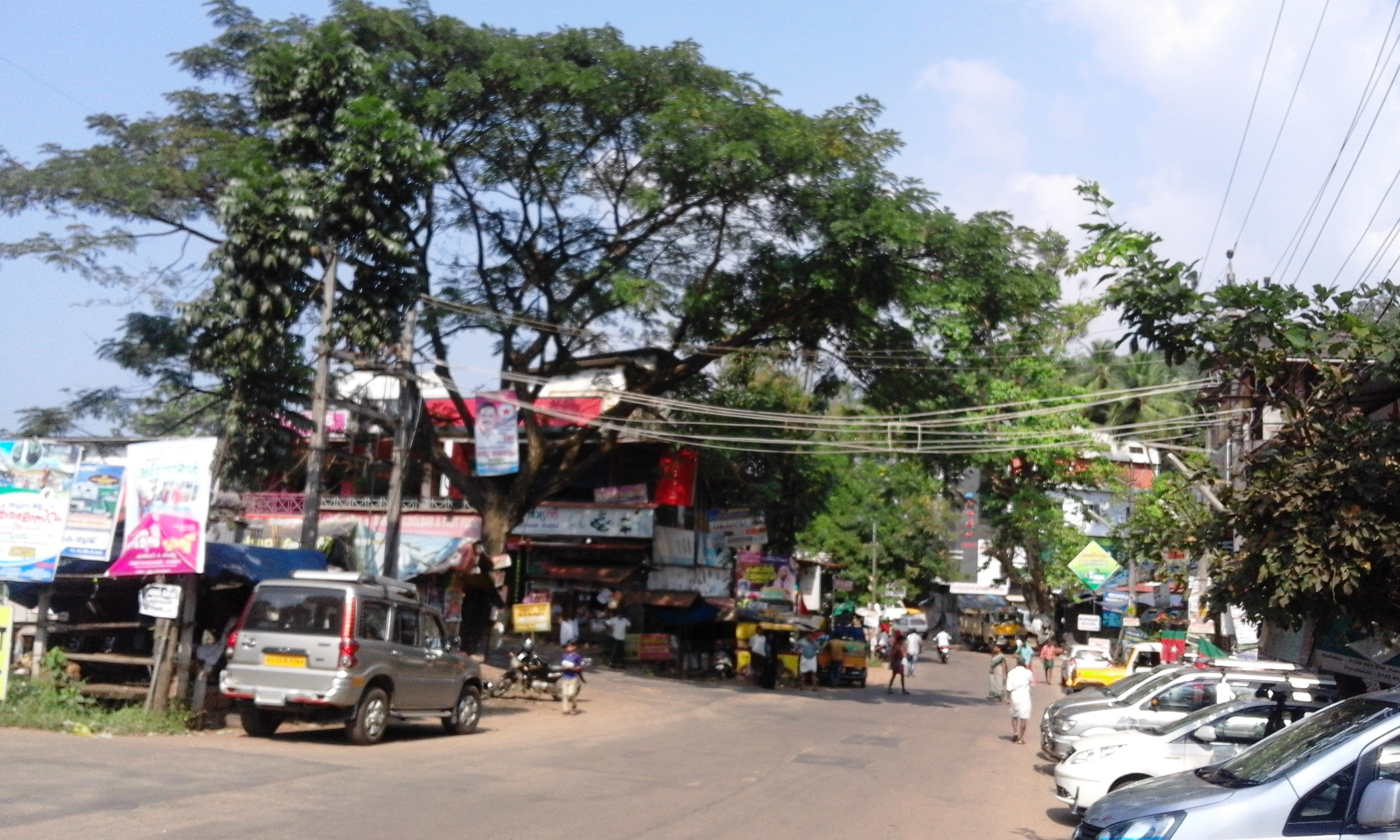
- Karuvarakkundu Town

- Location in Kerala, India Kerala Estate (India)
- Coordinates: 11°8′30″N 76°20′30″E
- Country: India
- State: Kerala
- District: Malappuram

Population (2011)
  - Total: 14,871

Languages
  - Official: Malayalam, English
- Time zone: UTC+5:30 (IST)
- PIN: 676525
- Vehicle registration: KL71-

Kerala Estate is a village near Karuvarakundu and Kalikavu in Malappuram district in the state of Kerala, India.

== Demographics ==
As of 2011 India census, Kerala Estate had a population of 14871 with 7070 males and 7801 females.

== Transportation ==
Keralaestate village connects to other parts of India through Nilambur town. State Highway No.28 starts from Nilambur and connects to Ooty, Mysore and Bangalore through Highways.12,29 and 181. National highway No.66 passes through Ramanattukara and the northern stretch connects to Goa and Mumbai. The southern stretch connects to Cochin and Trivandrum. State. The nearest airport is at Kozhikode. The nearest major railway station is at Feroke.
