= K. Krishnan =

Indian politician

Member of the Legislative Assembly for Mannarkkad
- In office 1957-1967

Personal details
- Born: 1916
- Died: 13 February 1976 (aged 59–60)
- Political party: Communist Party of India

Kongasseri Krishnan (1916 – 13 February 1976) was an Indian politician and leader of Communist Party of India. He represented Mannarkkad constituency in 1st and 2nd Kerala Legislative Assembly.
