= Kanjirampuzha Gram Panchayat =

Local government

Kanjirapuzha is a gram panchayat in the Palakkad district, state of Kerala, India. It is a local government organisation serving the villages of Pottassery-I and Pottassery-II.
