= A. N. Yusuff =

Indian politician (born 1926)

A. N. Yusuff (born 12 February 1926) was an Indian politician and leader of Communist Party of India. He represented Mannarkkad constituency in 5th KLA.
