= Agali, Palakkad =

Agali
- Village
- Location in Kerala, India Agali (India)
- Coordinates: 11.1012°N 76.6474°E
- Country: India
- State: Kerala
- District: Palakkad

Government
  - Type: Gram Panchayat

Area
  - Total: 76 km^{2} (29 sq mi)

Population
  - Total: 22,327
  - Density: 290/km^{2} (760/sq mi)

Languages
  - Official: Malayalam, English
- Time zone: UTC+5:30 (IST)
- Vehicle registration: KL-50

Agali is a village in Palakkad district in the state of Kerala, India. It forms a part of the Agali Grama Panchayat.

== Silent Valley National Park ==
Agali is the nearest town for travelling to Silent Valley National Park. There are three Lodges and several resorts in Agali town catering to tourists coming to Silent Valley, as the town is only 16 kilometers from the Park.

== Demographics ==
As of 2011 Indian census, Agali village had population of 22,327 with an area spread over 76 km^{2} where males constitute 11,239 and females constitute 11,088. Population of children in the age group of 0-6 was 2,346 where 1,195 are males and 1,151 are females. Overall literacy of Agali village was 79.9% lower than state average of 94% among which male literacy was 84.2% and female literacy was 75.5%.

Agali grama panchayat had total population of 34,941 with an area spread over 153 km^{2}. Among which males constitute 17,393 and females constitute 17,548. Total number of households were 8,695 in the panchayat limits. Agali panchayat has administration over 2 revenue villages like Agali and Kallamala. Population in the age group 0-6 was 3,786. Total literacy of Agali grama panchayat was 82.7%.

== Transportation ==
Agali is 38 km from Mannarkkad in Kerala. The little town of Anakkatti on Tamil Nadu border is only 18 km from Agali. Buses from Anaikatti come to Agali through Anakkatti - Mannarkkad road and the distance is 18 km.
