= P. Kumaran =

Indian politician

P. Kumaran (26 October 1934 – 26 October 2020) was an Indian politician and leader of Communist Party of India. He represented Mannarkkad constituency in 7th KLA.
