= Keralamkundu Waterfalls =

Waterfalls in Kerala, India

Coordinates: 11°07′56″N 76°23′12″E

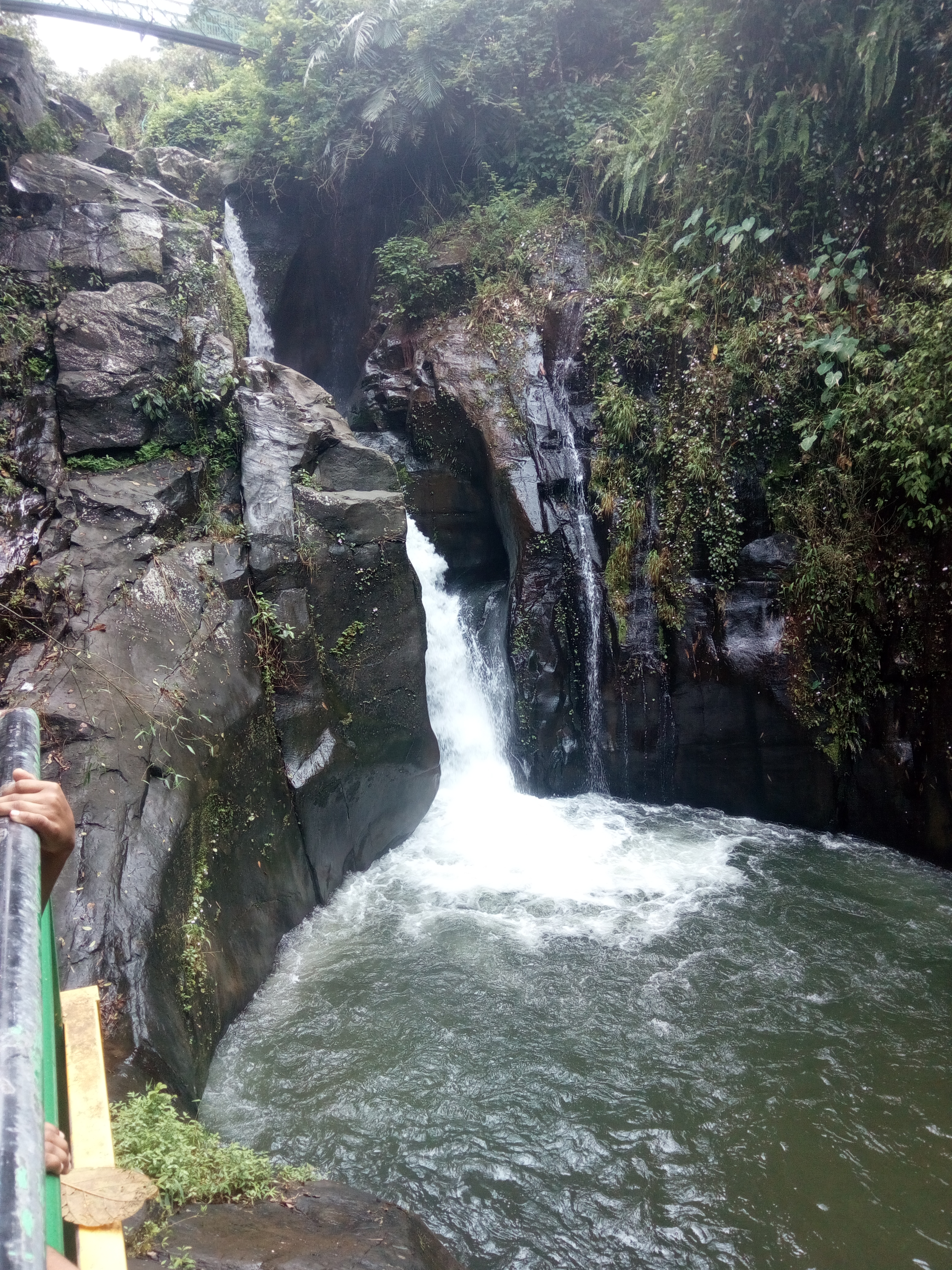
- Interactive map of Keralamkundu Waterfalls
- Location: Malappuram district, Kerala, India
- Longest drop: 150 ft (46 m)

Keralamkund Falls is located above 1500 feet from the sea level in the Kumpan mountain at Karuvarakkund near the Silent Valley National Park on the northeastern border of Malappuram district, Kerala. It is one of the major water falls in Malappuram and was included in the map of national adventure tourism in 2016.

== Overview ==
Keralamkund is the first tourism center in Malappuram district to be included in the national adventure tourism map. It is situated at the foothills of Kumpanmala, at an altitude of 1350 feet above sea level in shadow of the Western Ghats. The waterfall is formed by the confluence of streams flowing through various tributaries on the mountain. The climate is cool and the region is home to rare species of flora and fauna. The area is also considered as a danger zone as it has led to death of some people. The Natmug Valley, which has castor plantations is nearly a kilometer from here. Karuvarakund, a recreation areas are also a major hub for young people is located 7 km from here. The Cherumb eco village is also located near to Keralamkund waterfalls.

Despite its popularity, the site has faced significant maintenance issues. By 2025, reports highlighted the dilapidation of the DTPC-owned tourism centre, citing rusted iron staircases, inaccessible approach roads, and environmental hazards caused by an overflowing septic tank discharging waste into the river.

== See also ==
- Wetlands in Indian cities
