= Thenkara =

Human settlement in India

Thenkara is a gram panchayat in the Palakkad district, state of Kerala, India. It is 5 km away from mannarkkad town. It has a local government organisation that serves the village of Mannarkad-II.
