= Jose Baby =

Indian politician

Member of the Kerala Legislative Assembly
- In office 2006–2011
- Preceded by: Kalathil Abdulla
- Succeeded by: N. Samsudheen
- Constituency: Mannarkkad
- In office 1996–2001
- Preceded by: Kalladi Mohammed
- Succeeded by: Kalathil Abdulla
- Constituency: Mannarkkad

Personal details
- Born: February 24, 1959 (age 67)
- Party: Communist Party of India

Jose Baby (born 24 February 1959) is an Indian politician and leader of Communist Party of India. He was the Deputy Speaker of 12th KLA. He represented Mannarkkad constituency in 10th and 12th Kerala Legislative Assembly.
