= Palakkayam =

- Village
- Map showing Palakkayam in Kerala Palakkayam (India)
- Coordinates: 11°0′0″N 76°35′35″E
- Country: India
- State: Kerala
- District: Palakkad

Population (2011)
  - Total: 7,512

Languages
  - Official: Malayalam, English
- Time zone: UTC+5:30 (IST)
- PIN: 678591
- Telephone code: 04924

Palakkayam is a village in the Mannarkkad taluk of the Palakkad district in Kerala, India. Administratively, it falls under the Karimba, Thachampara and Kanjirappuzha gram panchayat. It is situated approximately 35 km from the district headquarters, Palakkad, and 16 km from the eco-tourism spot at Siruvani Dam. The village is connected via Edakkurissi on the Palakkad-Kozhikode National Highway and is about 120 km from Kozhikode.

== Geography and Connectivity ==
The village is known for its proximity to Kanjirapuzha Dam, a key irrigation structure located 6 km away. The nearest airport is in Coimbatore, Tamil Nadu, about 100 km away, while the nearest railway station is Palakkad Junction, situated 30 km from the village.

== Demographics ==
According to the 2011 Census, Palakkayam has a population of 7,512, comprising 3,729 males and 3,783 females. The literacy rate is 79%, below Kerala's state average of 94%. The sex ratio stands at 1,014 females per 1,000 males. Scheduled Castes and Scheduled Tribes make up 6.95% and 11.24% of the population, respectively.

== Economy and Livelihood ==
Agriculture plays a significant role in the local economy. Of the working population, many are cultivators or agricultural laborers. Public and private bus services connect the village to nearby towns and cities.

== Facilities ==
Palakkayam has educational institutions like Carmel HSS and healthcare facilities including the Assumption Hospital in nearby Kanjirapuzha. The village also hosts the St. Mary's Church Palakkayam.

== Tourism ==
The serene surroundings of Palakkayam attract visitors to its nearby eco-tourism and irrigation sites, including Siruvani and Kanjirapuzha dams.
