= Sholayar Gram Panchayat =

Gram Panchayat in Palakkad district of Kerala, India

Sholayar is a gram panchayat in the Palakkad district, state of Kerala, India. It is a local government organisation that serves the villages of Sholayur and Kottathara.
