= Padavayal =

- village
- Country: India
- State: Kerala
- District: Palakkad

Area
  - Total: 320.26 km^{2} (123.65 sq mi)

Population (2011)
  - Total: 6,144
  - Density: 19.18/km^{2} (49.69/sq mi)

Languages
  - Official: Malayalam, English
- Time zone: UTC+5:30 (IST)
- PIN: 6XXXXX
- Vehicle registration: KL-50

Padavayal is a village in the Palakkad district, state of Kerala, India. It is administrated by the Pudur Grama Panchayat.

== Demographics ==
As of the 2011 India census, the village of Padavayal had a total population of 6,144, of whom 3,053 were males and 3,091 were females. The total number of households was 1,719. Population of children in the age group of 0-6 is 881 (14.3%) which consists of 438 boys and 443 girls. The literacy rate of Padavayal was 58.9% lower than state average of 94%: the male literate population was 1,752 (67%), and the female literate population was 1,347 (50.9%).
