= Alanallur =

Alanallur അലനല്ലൂർ
- gram panchayat
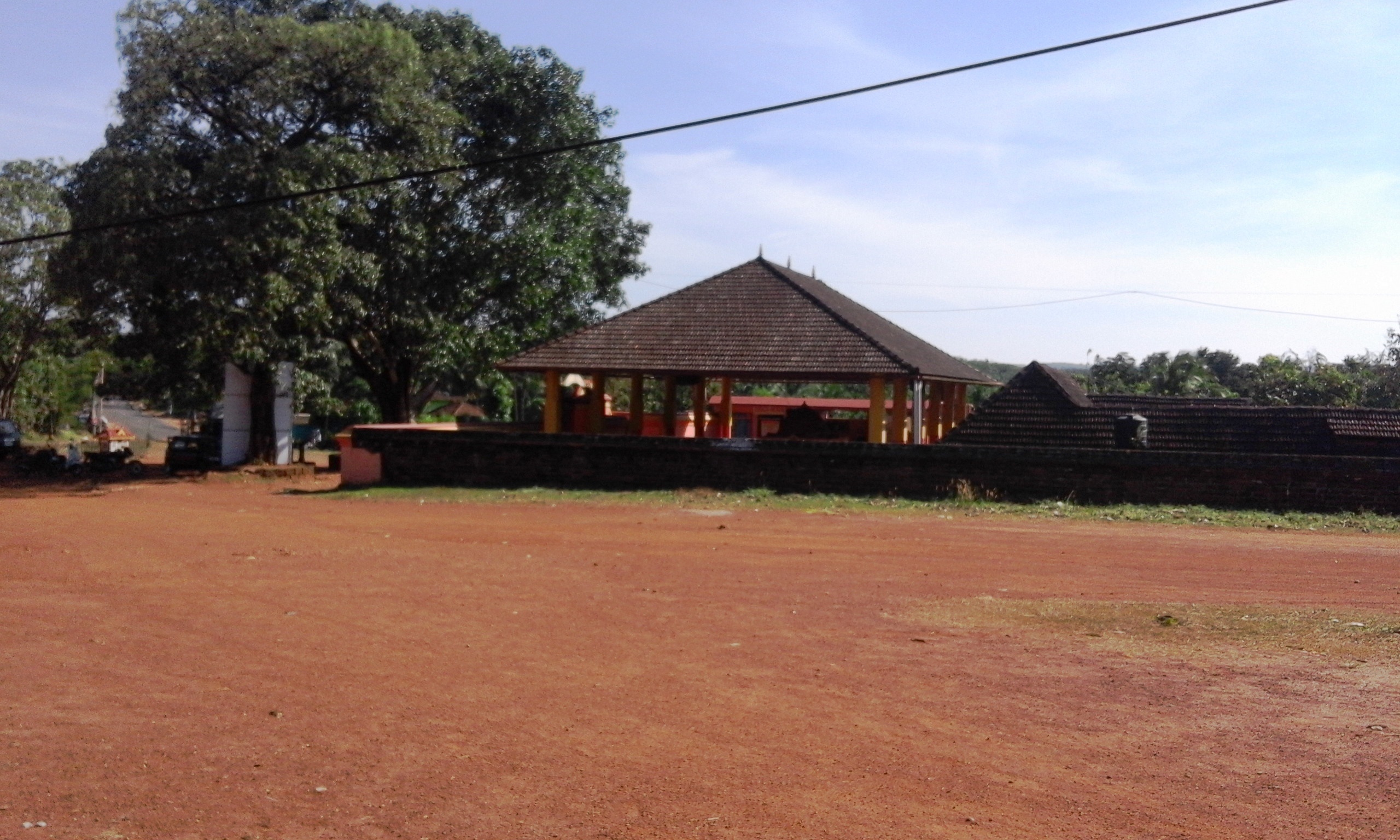
- Ayyappa Temple, Alanallur

- Location in Kerala, India Alanallur (India)
- Coordinates: 11°00′40″N 76°20′46″E
- Country: India
- State: Kerala
- Region: South Malabar
- District: Palakkad

Government
  - Type: gram panchayat
  - Body: Alanallur Panchayat Council
  - President: Habeebullah Ansari (UDF)
  - Vice president: Mariya Aambukaad (UDF)

Area
  - Total: 58.24 km^{2} (22.49 sq mi)
- Elevation: 76 m (249 ft)

Population
  - Total: 52,554
  - Density: 902.4/km^{2} (2,337/sq mi)

Languages
  - Official: Malayalam, English
- Time zone: UTC+5:30 (IST)
- PIN: 678601
- Telephone code: + 91, STD (04924)
- Vehicle registration: KL-50
- Parliament constituency: Palakkad
- Assembly constituency: Mannarkkad

Alanallur is a gram panchayat in the Palakkad district, state of Kerala, India. It is a local government organization that serves the villages of Alanallur-I, Alanallur-II and Alanallur-III.

== History ==
Alanallur is a village and grama panchayat located in the Mannarkad taluk of Palakkad district, Kerala, India. Historically, the area formed part of the Valluvanad region, an important territorial division in medieval Kerala.

During the medieval period, Valluvanad was ruled by local chieftains and later came under the influence of the Zamorin of Calicut (Samuthiri). Alanallur and its surrounding areas were predominantly agrarian, with settlements developing around paddy cultivation, forest resources, and local water bodies. The region also lay close to inland trade routes connecting Palakkad with the Malabar coast.

Islam reached the area at an early stage through Arab traders, leading to the establishment of mosques and the growth of a significant Muslim population, alongside Hindu communities. Religious and cultural coexistence has historically been a feature of the region.

In the late 18th century, the area briefly came under the control of the Kingdom of Mysore during the invasions led by Hyder Ali and Tipu Sultan. Following the Third Anglo-Mysore War (1792), the region was ceded to the British and became part of the Malabar District of the Madras Presidency. Under British administration, formal land revenue systems, village boundaries, and basic infrastructure were introduced.

After Indian independence in 1947, Alanallur became part of the newly formed state of Kerala in 1956 following the States Reorganisation Act. The Alanallur Grama Panchayat was subsequently constituted under Kerala's local self-government system. Since then, the area has seen gradual development in education, healthcare, transportation, and public services.

== Geography ==
Alanallur is a grama panchayat situated in the Mannarkad taluk of Palakkad district, in the Indian state of Kerala. The panchayat lies in the central part of Palakkad district, close to the boundary with Malappuram district. It forms part of the transitional zone between the Western Ghats foothills and the plains of central Kerala.

The panchayat covers an area of approximately 58 square kilometres and comprises the villages of Alanallur-I, Alanallur-II, and Alanallur-III. The terrain is a mix of low-lying agricultural plains and gently undulating terrain, with some elevated areas towards the eastern side.

Several small streams and water channels flow through the area, contributing to local irrigation. The Velliyar River, a tributary of the Bharathapuzha river system, flows near or through parts of the panchayat and serves as an important water source for agriculture and domestic use.

Alanallur experiences a tropical monsoon climate, with heavy rainfall during the southwest and northeast monsoons. Summers are generally warm, while winters are mild. The region's fertile soil and availability of water support agriculture, with major crops including paddy, coconut, rubber, and arecanut.

The panchayat is bordered by neighbouring local bodies such as Kottoppadam, Thazhekkad, and areas of Malappuram district, and is well connected to nearby towns including Mannarkad and Perinthalmanna by road.

== Civic Administration ==
=== Alanallur Panchayt Election 2025 ===
S.No.	Party name	Party symbol	Number of Members
01	UDF		20
02	LDF		4
03	Independents		0

=== Alanallur Grama Panchayt Members ===
Ward No.	Ward Name	Member Name
1	Chalava	Basheer Padukundil
2	Uppukulam	Shailaja Marthadi
3	Padikkappadam	Jaseena V. P.
4	Mundakunnu	Nijas O. P.
5	Kairali	Anil Kumar A.
6	Pallikkunnu	Shinu K.
7	Mallikunnu	Habibullah Ansari
8	Perimbadari	Kalid Ramakrishnan
9	Kattukulam	Abdur Rahman K.
10	Pakkath Kulambu	Jashila E.
11	Kannamkundu	Anshad Ali K.
12	Kalangottiri	Raji
13	Alanallur Town	Sajitha R.
14	Vazhangalli	Faisal Kittath
15	Kara	Umesh B. N.
16	Chirattakkulum	Naseer Jamsheer
17	Unniyal	Manikantan Rajiv
18	Kulapparambu	Rubina Akbar
19	Alungal	Jaleel Teacher
20	Kaanamkode	Mariya Ambukkod
21	Yatthimghana	Mansoor Pallippetta
22	Alamkunnu	Suresh Babu Kodungallur
23	Kottapalla	Jaleel Nazar
24	Kunjikkulam	Vijayashree T.

== Picture Gallery ==
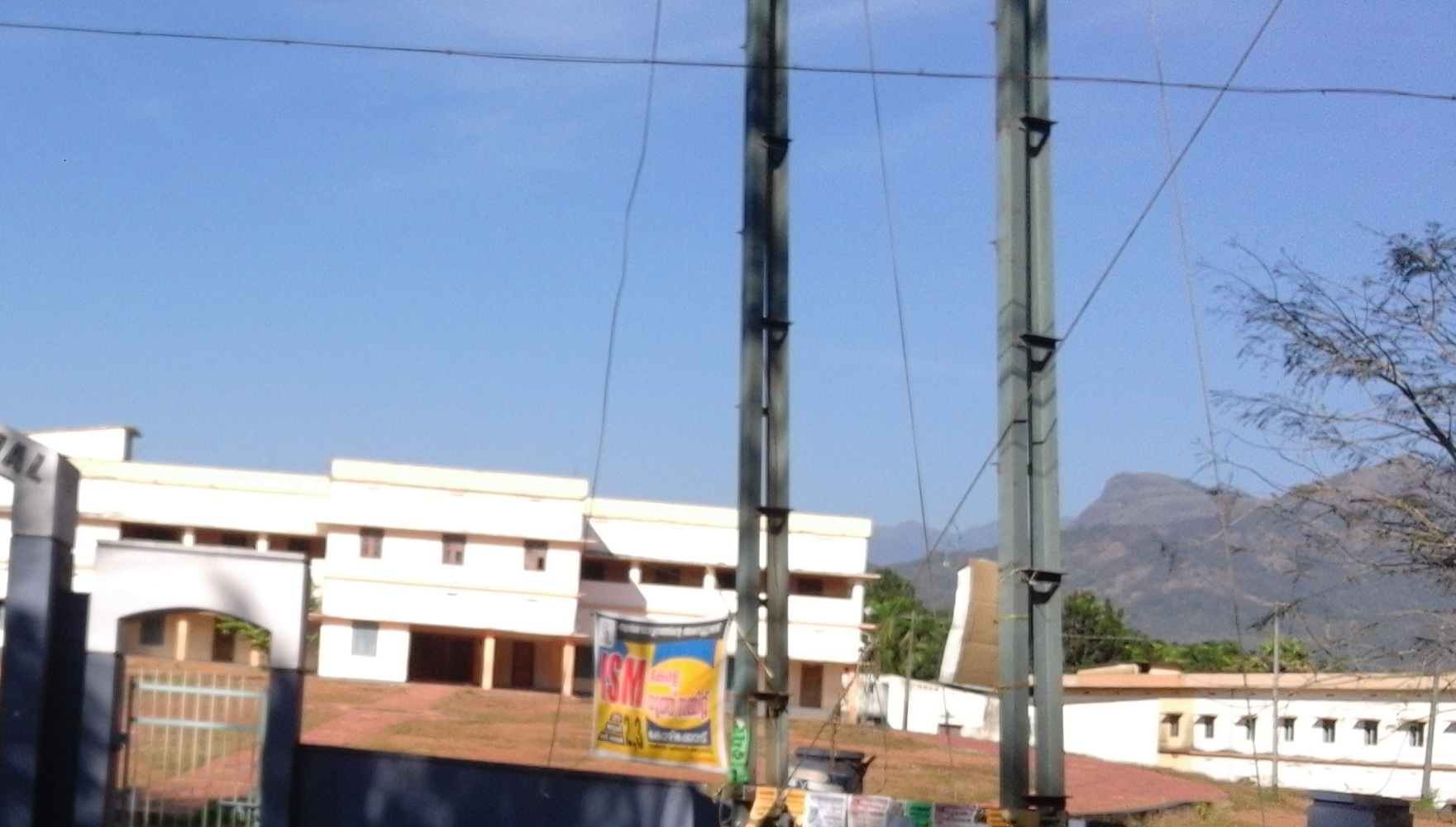
Haji School, Edathanattukara

Edathanattukara Town

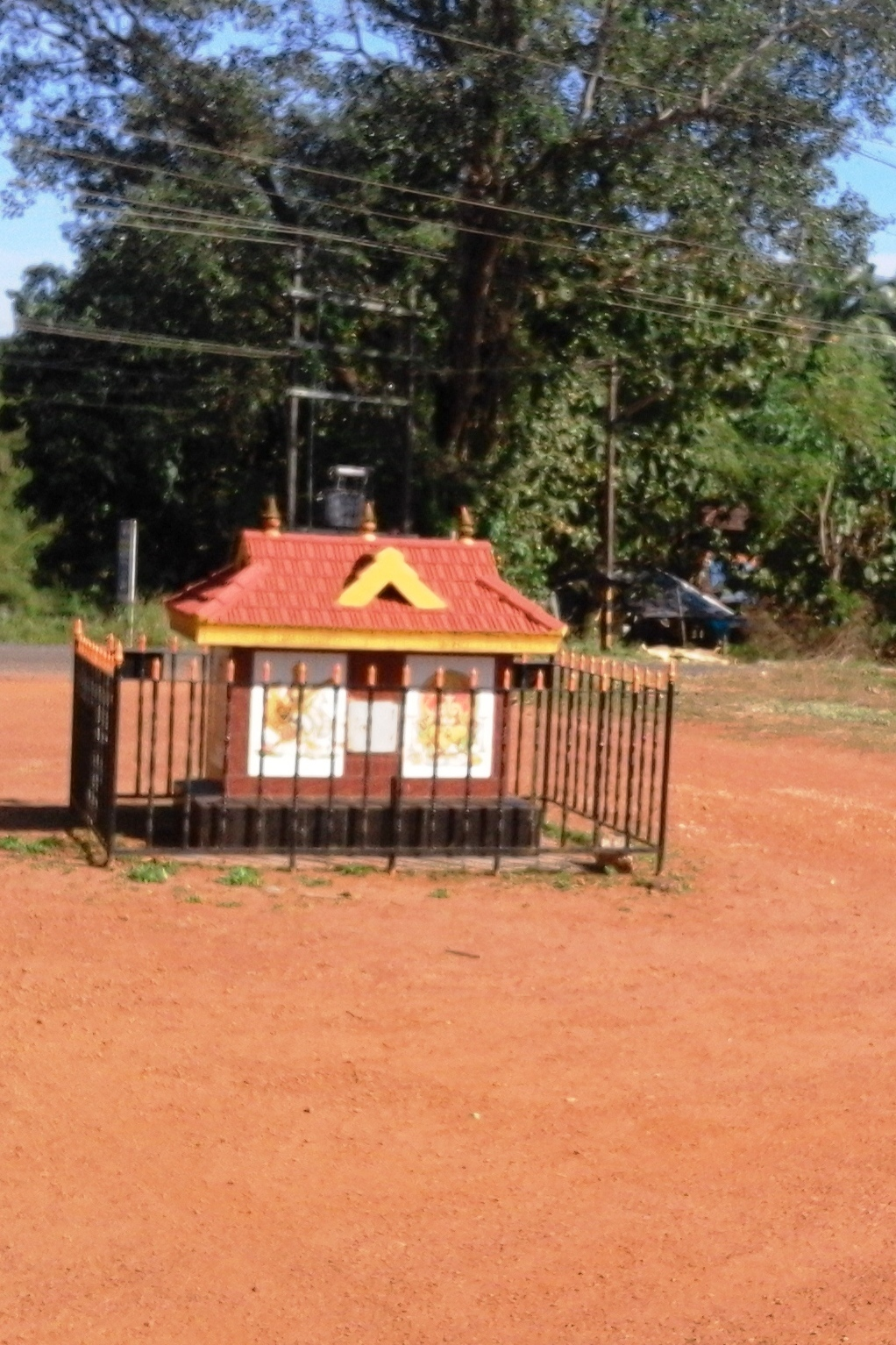
Bhandar at the Ayyappa Temple

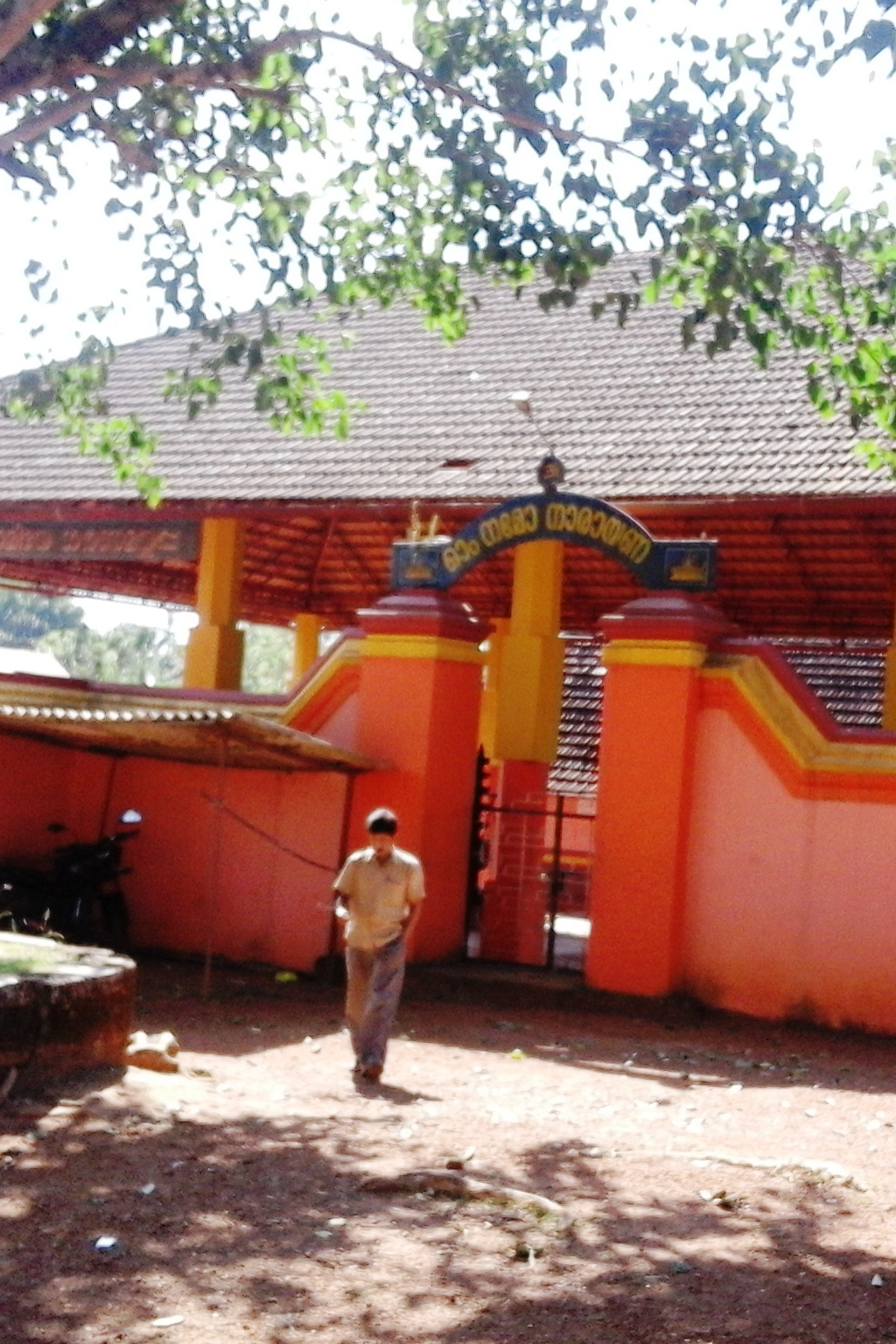
Ayyappa Temple jpg
