= Karimba, Palakkad =

Human settlement in Kerala, India

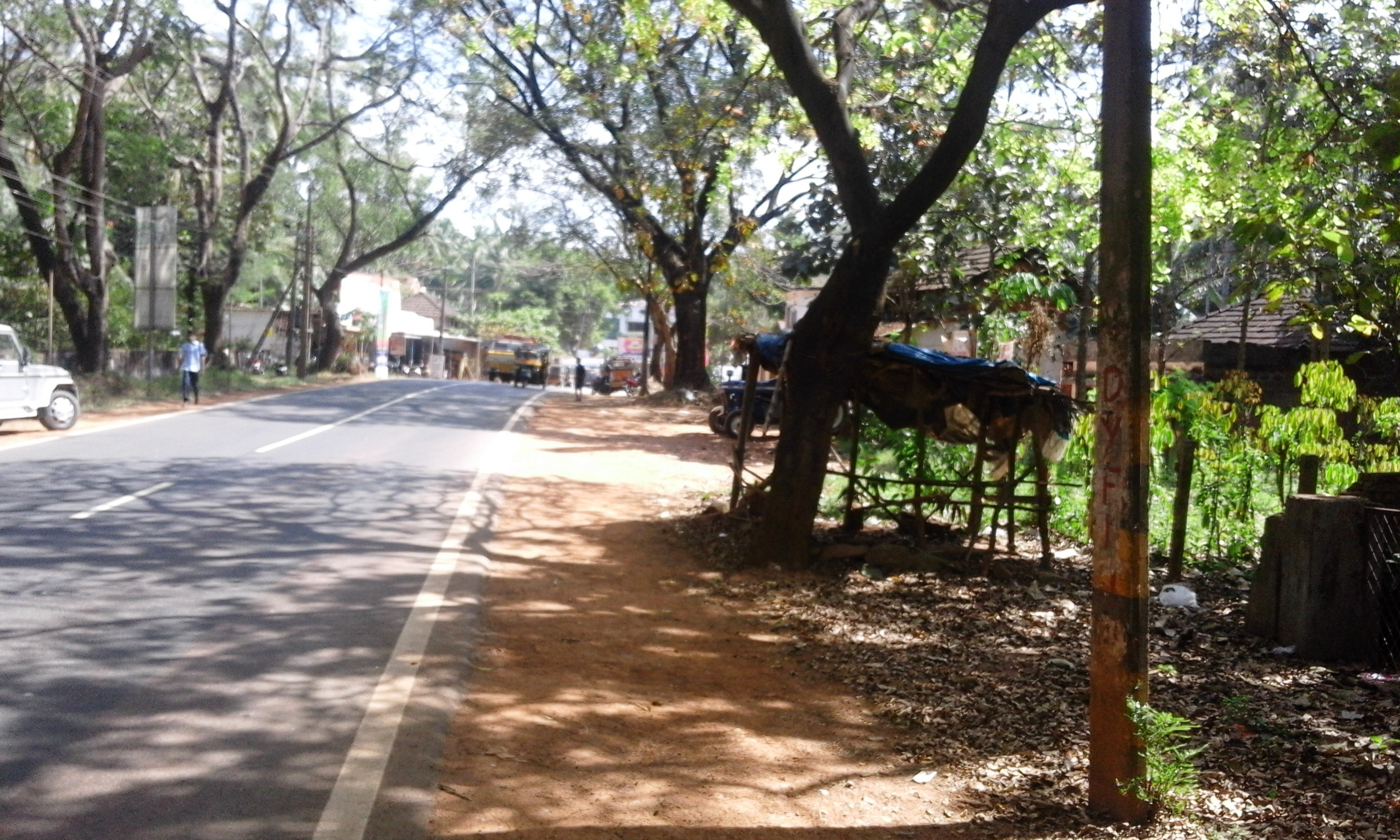
Kalladikode is the biggest town in Karimba Panchayath

Karimba (Malayalam: കരിമ്പ) is a gram panchayat in the Palakkad district, state of Kerala, India, near the National Highway 966. The largest town in Karimba panchayat is Kalladikode. It borders with Thachampara, Kongad, Kadampazhipuram and Mundur gram panchayats. Recently, it was awarded the Nirmal Gram title for sanitation. It is the local government organization that serves the villages of Karimba-I, Karimba-II and Palakkayam.

== Demographics ==
As of 2011 India census

• Karimba-I village had a population of 14,887 with 7,211 males and 7,676 females.

• Karimba-II village had a population of 11,930 with 5,744 males and 6,186 females.

• Palakkayam village had a population of 7,512 with 3,729 males and 3,783 females.

== Important landmarks ==
- Meenvallam waterfalls, a natural waterfall situated 6 kilometers from Kalladikode. This is the first micro hydroelectric project that was built and operated by a panchayath in India.
