= Agali Gram Panchayat =

Gram panchayat in Palakkad district, Kerala, India

Agali
- Town
- Location in Kerala, India Agali (India)
- Coordinates: 11.1012°N 76.6474°E
- Country: India
- State: Kerala
- District: Palakkad

Government
  - Type: Grama Panchayat

Area
  - Total: 153 km^{2} (59 sq mi)

Population
  - Total: 34,941
  - Density: 228/km^{2} (591/sq mi)

Languages
  - Official: Malayalam, English
- Time zone: UTC+5:30 (IST)
- Vehicle registration: KL-50

Agali is a grama panchayat in the Palakkad district, state of Kerala, India. It is a local government organisation that serves the villages of Agali and Kallamala.
