= Kottappadam =

Gram Panchayat in Palakkad district of Kerala, India

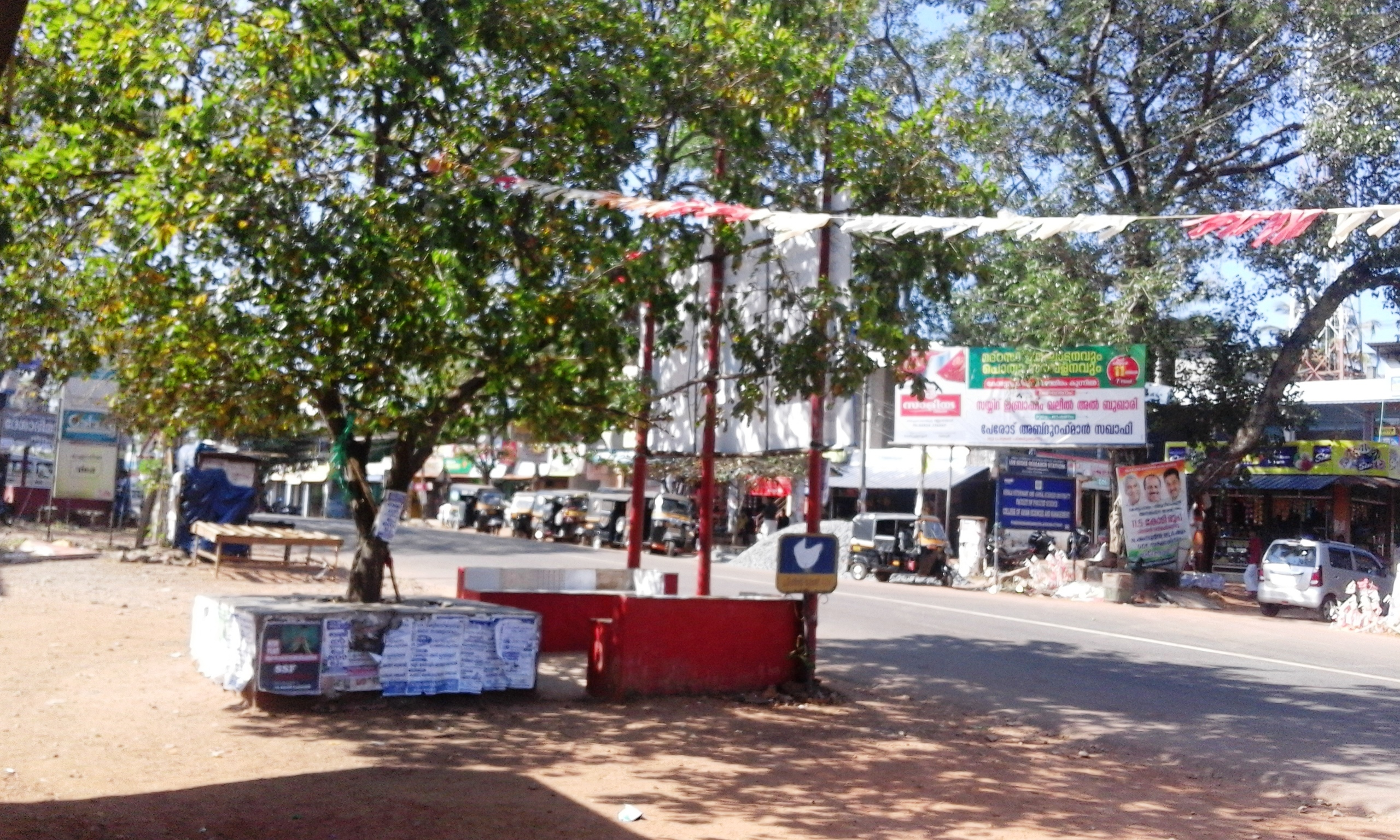
Kottompadam, Mannarkkad

Kottappadam (Kottoppadam) is a gram panchayat in the Palakkad district, state of Kerala, India. It is a local government organisation that serves the villages of Kottoppadam-I, Kottoppadam-II and Kottoppadam-III.
