= Pottassery-I =

Pottassery
- village
- Location in Kerala, India Pottassery (India)
- Coordinates: 10°59′42″N 76°30′19″E
- Country: India
- State: Kerala
- District: Palakkad

Population (2011)
  - Total: 20,873

Languages
  - Official: Malayalam, English
- Time zone: UTC+5:30 (IST)
- PIN: 678598
- Vehicle registration: KL- 50
- Website: www.pottassery.com

Pottassery-I is a village in the Palakkad district, state of Kerala, India. It forms a part of the Kanjirappuzha for administrative purposes.

== Demographics ==
As of 2011 India census, Pottassery-I had a population of 20,873 with 10,052 males and 10,821 females.
