= Pandikkad =

- Town
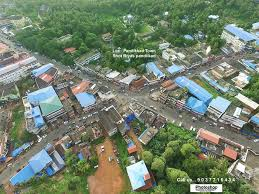
- Pandikkad town

- Location in Kerala, India Pandikkad (India)
- Coordinates: 11°5′45″N 76°13′25″E
- Country: India
- State: Kerala
- District: Malappuram
- Time zone: UTC+5:30 (IST)
- PIN: 676521
- Telephone code: 0091483278
- Vehicle registration: KL-10
- Coastline: 0 kilometres (0 mi)
- Nearest city: Manjeri
- Lok Sabha constituency: Malappuram
- Climate: Tropical monsoon (Köppen)
- Avg. summer temperature: 35 °C (95 °F)
- Avg. winter temperature: 20 °C (68 °F)

Pandikkad is a town located in the Eranad Taluk, Malappuram district, Kerala, India.
