= Kottoppadam, Mannarkkad =

Kottoppadam-I
- village
- Location in Kerala, India Kottoppadam-I (India)
- Coordinates: 10.997943°N 76.391408°E
- Country: India
- State: Kerala
- District: Palakkad

Population (2011)
  - Total: 43,283

Languages
  - Official: Malayalam, English
- Time zone: UTC+5:30 (IST)
- PIN: 678583
- Vehicle registration: KL-50

Kottoppadam-I is a village in Palakkad district in the state of Kerala, India. Kottoppadam-I, Kottoppadam-II and Kottoppadam-III come under the administration of the Kottappadam gram panchayat.

== Demographics ==
Kottopadam.I (as of 2011 Indian census): 14,085, Kottopadam.II (as of 2009): 13,295, Kottopadam.III: 17,847 (as of 2011 Indian census) and total population of Kottopadam area: 45,227.

== Important Landmarks ==
- Ariyur thod
- Government School, Bheemanad

== Suburbs and Villages ==
- Venga
- Bheemanad
- A.B.Road
- Ariyoor
- Aryambavu
- Kombam
- Kodakkad
- Ambazhakode
- Kandamangalam
- Kacheriparampu
- Thiruvizhamkunnu
- Kanjhiram kunne
