= Pottassery-II =

- village
- Location in Kerala, India Pottassery-II (India)
- Coordinates: 10°59′42″N 76°30′19″E
- Country: India
- State: Kerala
- District: Palakkad

Population (2011)
  - Total: 10,391

Languages
  - Official: Malayalam, English
- Time zone: UTC+5:30 (IST)
- PIN: 678593
- Vehicle registration: KL-50

Pottassery-II is a village in the Palakkad district, state of Kerala, India. It is administered by the Tachampara gram panchayat and the Kanjirampuzha gram panchayat. The village contains the places of Mundakkunnu, Kanjiram, and Pottassery.

== Demographics ==
As of 2011 India census, Pottassery-II had a population of 10,391 with 5,001 males and 5,390 females.
