= Kallamala =

- village
- Location in Kerala, India
- Coordinates: 11.0489°N 76.5691°E
- Country: India
- State: Kerala
- District: Palakkad

Government
  - Body: Agali Grama Panchayat

Area
  - Total: 77 km^{2} (30 sq mi)

Population (2011)
  - Total: 12,379
  - Density: 160/km^{2} (420/sq mi)

Languages
  - Official: Malayalam, English
- Time zone: UTC+5:30 (IST)
- PIN: 6XXXXX
- Vehicle registration: KL-50

Kallamala is a village in the Palakkad district, state of Kerala, India. It is administrated by the Agali gram panchayat.

== Demographics ==
As of 2011 Indian census, Kallamala village had total population of 12,379 where 6,030 are males and 6,349 are females. Total number of households were 2,861. Population in the age group 0–6 was 1,420 where 693 are males and 727 are females. Kallamala had overall literacy of 87.7% where male literacy is 91.3% and female literacy is 84.3%.
