= Pudur, Palakkad =

Pudur
- village
- Country: India
- State: Kerala
- District: Palakkad

Government
  - Body: Pudur Grama Panchayat

Area
  - Total: 93.2 km^{2} (36.0 sq mi)

Population (2011)
  - Total: 6,026
  - Density: 64.7/km^{2} (167/sq mi)

Languages
  - Official: Malayalam, English
- Time zone: UTC+5:30 (IST)
- PIN: 678581
- Vehicle registration: KL-50

Pudur is a village and gram panchayat in Palakkad district, Kerala, India.

== Demographics ==
As of 2001 India census, Pudur had a population of 5,798 with 2,994 males and 2,804 females.
