= Tachampara =

Village in Kerala, India

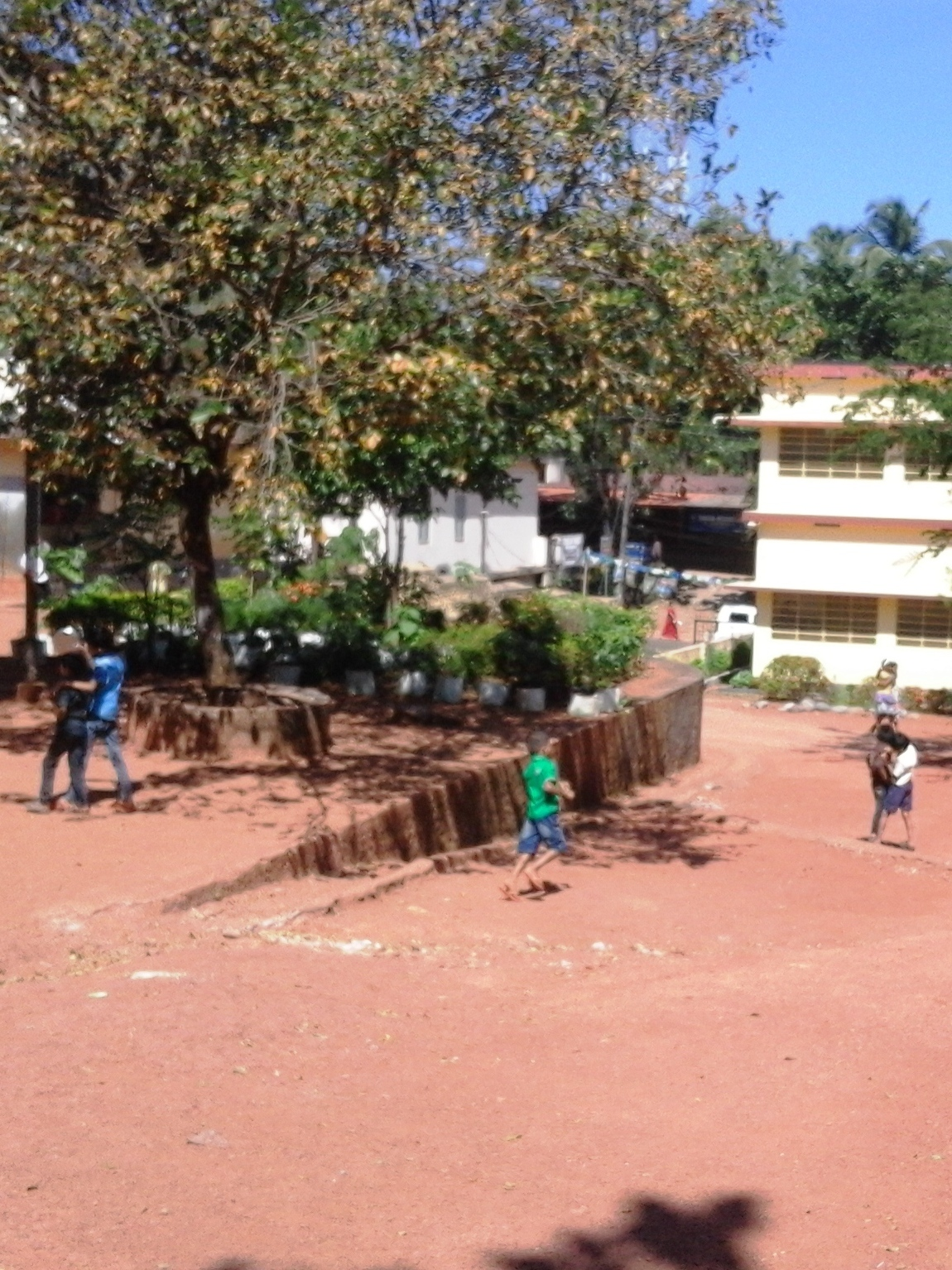
Thachampara School

Thachampara (also spelled Thachampara) is a village in the Palakkad district of Kerala, India. It is administered by the Thachampara Gram Panchayat.

== Demographics ==
As of 2001 India census, Thachampara had a population of 12,774, with 6,141 males and 6,633 females.
