= Sholayur =

- village
- Country: India
- State: Kerala
- District: Palakkad

Government
  - Body: Sholayur Grama Panchayat

Area
  - Total: 95.96 km^{2} (37.05 sq mi)

Population (2011)
  - Total: 7,012
  - Density: 73.07/km^{2} (189.3/sq mi)

Languages
  - Official: Malayalam, English
- Time zone: UTC+5:30 (IST)
- PIN: 6XXXXX
- Vehicle registration: KL-50

Sholayur is a village in the Palakkad district, state of Kerala, India. It forms a part of the Sholayur grama panchayat.

== Demographics ==
As of 2011 India census, Sholayur had a population of 7,012, with 3,507 males and 3,505 females.
