= Kanjirappuzha =

Kanjirappuzha may refer to:

- Kanjirappuzha (Mannarkkad), a tributary of the Thuthapuzha river, Kerala state, India
  - Kanjirapuzha Dam
- Kanjirappuzha (Nilambur), a tributary of the Chaliyar river, Kerala state, India
