= Kallar, Trivandrum =

Town in Kerala, India

Kallar is a small town in Thiruvananthapuram district in Kerala, India. Kallar is 45 km from Thiruvananthapuram, while the town of Ponmudi is a further 15 km away. The Vamanapuram River flows through the town. Torrential rain can raise the level of the river and sweep away things that come in its way; recently, several dental college students of Trivandrum died in flash floods. Many varieties of birds and trees also can be seen in and around Kallar.

== Gallery ==
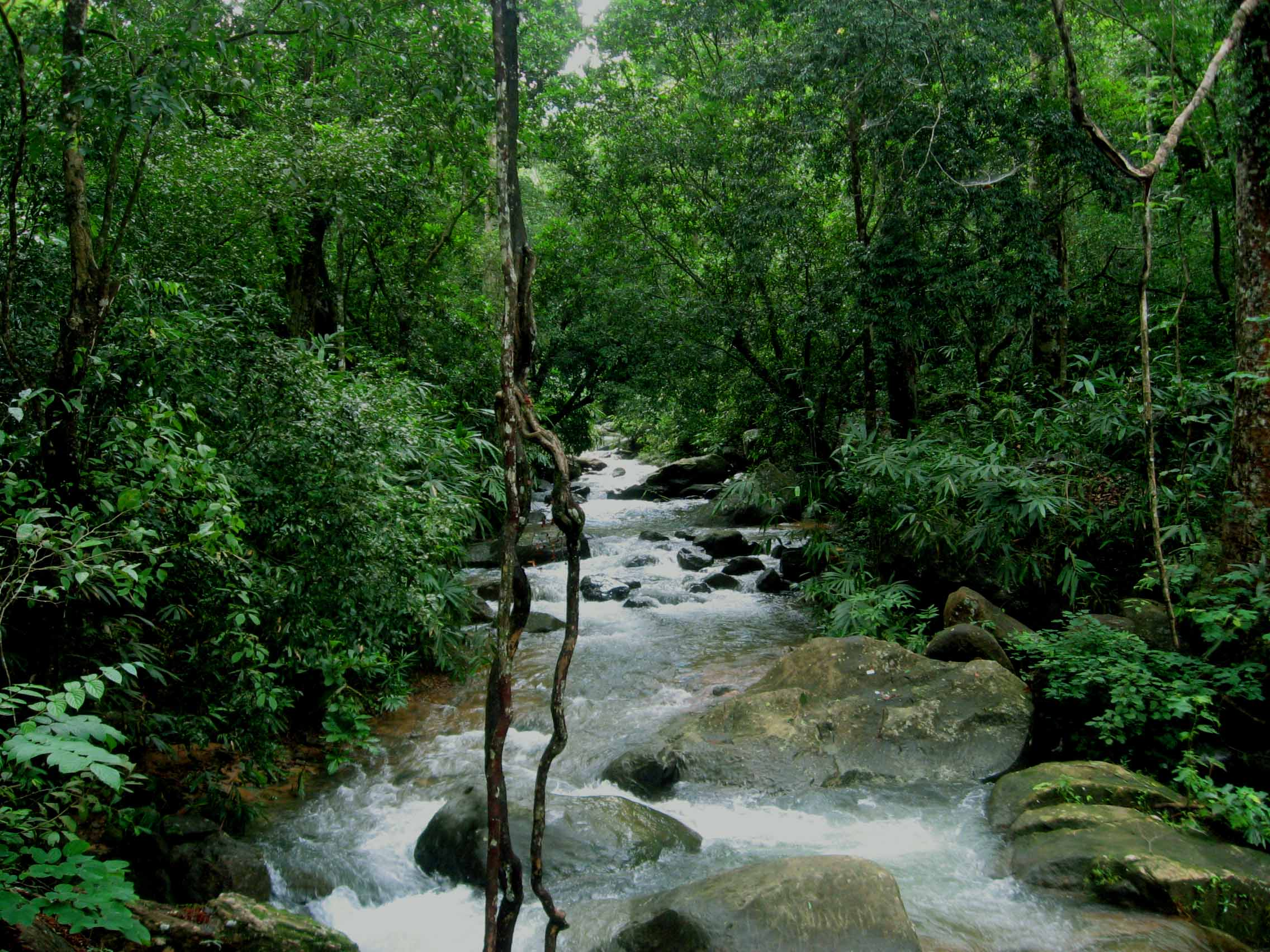
Kallar

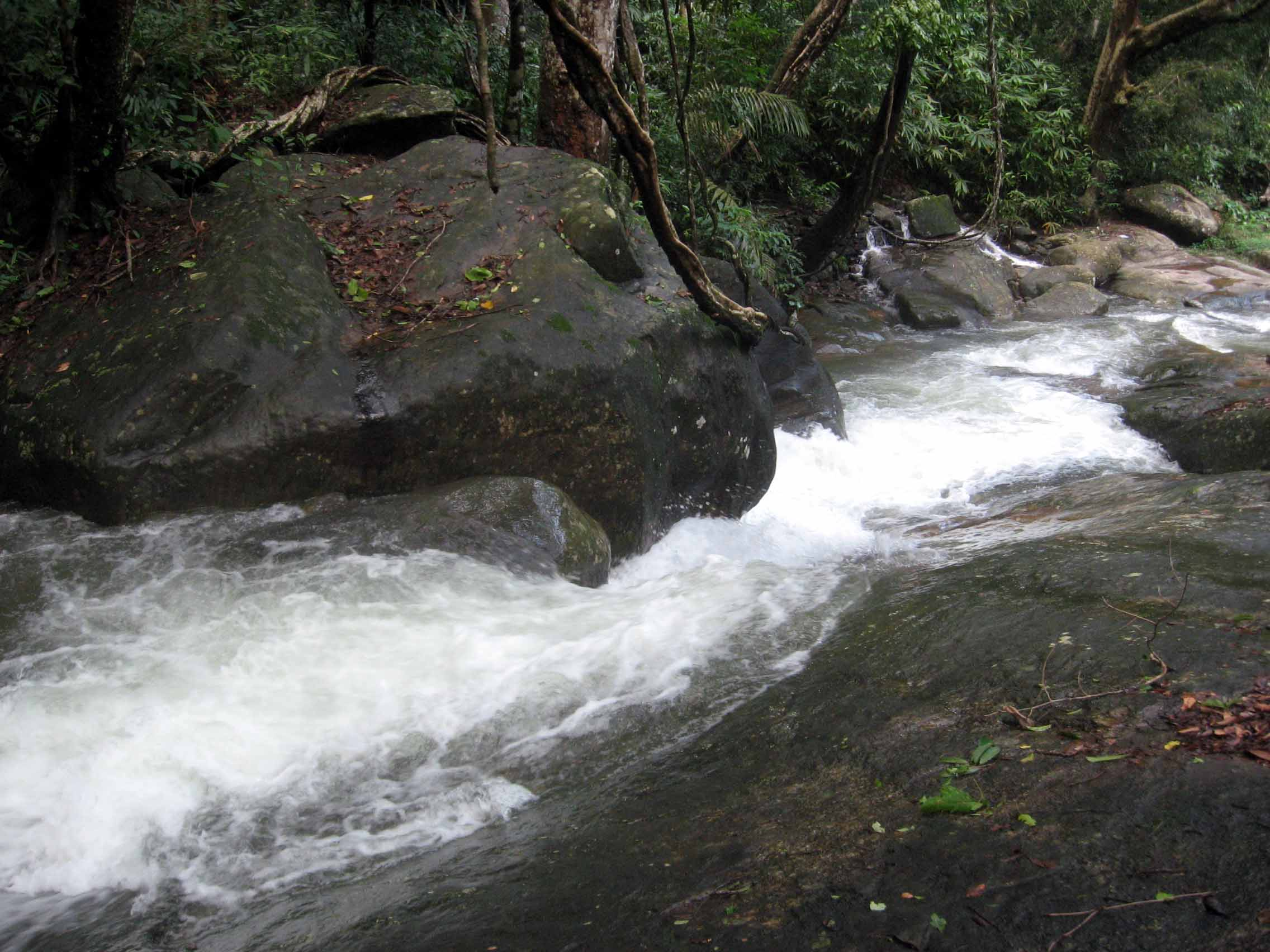
Waters of Kallar

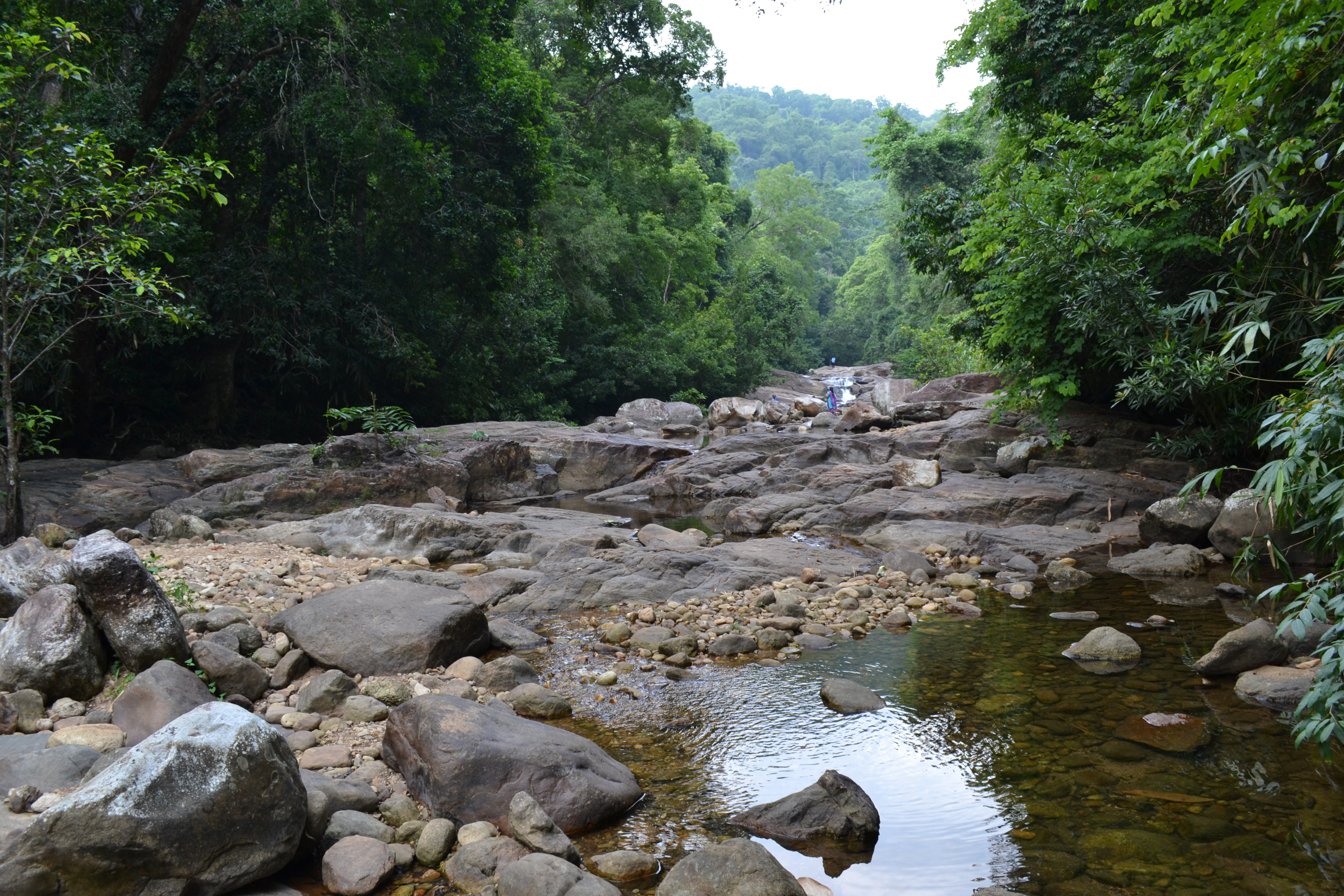
Kallar, Thiruvananthapuram
