= Mullathpara =

Mullathu para
- village
- Nickname: Gateway to olippara puzha
- Location in Kerala, India Mullathu para (India)
- Coordinates: 10.98°N 76.47°E
- Country: India
- State: Kerala
- District: Palakkad District
- Established: 1965
- Founder: Pothuvachola, Puvasseri, Maniparamban families

Government
  - Type: Panchayath ward
  - Body: Grama Panchayath, Thachampara.

Area
  - Total: 8.2 km^{2} (3.2 sq mi)
  - Rank: 124
- Elevation: 86 m (282 ft)

Population 950/1000
  - Total: 6,000
  - Density: 730/km^{2} (1,900/sq mi)
- Demonym: Mannarkkadans

Languages
  - Official: Malayalam
- Time zone: UTC+5:30 (IST)
- PIN: 678593
- Telephone code: 4924
- Vehicle registration: KL-50

Mullathpara is a village in the Palakkad district of Kerala State, South India. The headquarters is Mannarkkad Taluk. It is situated 34 km north-east of the district headquarters Palakkad, on the way to Kozhikode National Highway 213 (NH-213) and in the foothills of the Western Ghats. Silent Valley (a tropical evergreen rain forest with an unbroken evolutionary history of 50 million years) is only 45 km from Mullathpara.

== Education ==
The village has only one school (seventh day English Medium School) and most of the people in Mullathpara are uneducated and belongs to agricultural background family life occurred, In 1922 Muhammed Maniparambil begun a social renovation thinkers society.

== Transportation ==
Mullathpara is 8 km from Mannarkkad in Kerala. Between the little town of Thachampara and Chirakkal Padi, Kanjirapuzha Dam and Park is only 10 km from Mullathpara Junction. Buses from Palakkad, Muthukurussi, Karakurussi, come to Mullathpara through Kanjirapuzha, Mannarkkad Kozhikode and Karipur airport the distance is 81.00 km.

== Demographics ==
Even though Mullathpara is a small village the cultural harmony is like a Pooram festival, most decent peoples are living here. No any political and religious conflict recorded yet. High range of Mullathpara consists of settlers from south Kerala especially from kottayam, Pathanamthitta, Alappuzha districts and the schedule cast like Cherumar, Pananar, Pulluvar etc. can be seen here. Mullathpara is an Agricultural society, and gulf orient income the main products include rubber, plantain, cinnamon, pepper, coconut, areca nut, rice, banana, etc. It is expected great changes is going to happen here after the completion of major bypass in Palakkad - Kozhikode Highway. It will change the structure of the geographical alignment. here situated irrigation canal for agriculture purpose.

== Notable nearby locations ==
- Kanjirappuzha Dam & Gardens: 12 km
- Silent Valley National Park: 23 km
- Siruvani dam 25 km
- Salim Ali Bird Sanctuary Anakkatti:39 km
- Attappady Hills:10 km
- Nottamala Hills, 6 km
- British iron bridge 6 km
- Patrakkadavu Water falls 14 km
- Meenvallam & Atla Water Falls 15 km
- Ooty, 118 km (via Mannarkkad-attappadi-ooty)

== Politics ==
Mullath para Kongad assembly constituency is part of Palghat (Lok Sabha constituency). MB Rajesh is the present MP and K.V. Vijaya Das is the Present MLA of Kongad. Mannarkkad taluk. The local segments included with Kongad constituency are: Kanjirappuzha, Karakurissi, Thachampara and Karimba Panchayats in Mannarkkad Taluk; Keralassery, Kongad, Mankara, Mannur and Parali Panchayats in Palakkad Taluk

== People and Establishments ==
State level School student Choreographer- Radhakrishnan M

General Engineers Architects - Noushad K

== Tipu Sultan road ==
Mullathpara By the 18th century, all the petty kingdoms of Kerala had been absorbed or subordinated by three big states of Travancore, Calicut (ruled by Zamorins/ samuthiri) and Cochin. The Kingdom of Mysore, nominally ruled by the Wodeyar family, rose to prominence in India after the decline of the Mughal empire. In 1761, Hyder Ali seized control of all of the reins of power in Mysore by overthrowing a powerful minister and became the "de facto" head of Mysore Kingdom. He turned his attention towards expansion which included the capture of the Kingdoms of Bednur (Ikkeri or Keladi[2]), Sunda, Sera, and Canara. In 1766, he descended into Malabar and occupied the Kingdoms of Chirakkal (former Kolathunad), Kottayam, Kadathanad, Calicut, Valluvanad and Palghat and King of Cochin accepted his suzerainty and paid him tribute annually for from 1766 till 1790. Faruqabad, near Calicut, was the local capital of the Mysore-ruled Kerala.
