= Kallar River =

Stream in Kerala, India

Coordinates: 12°00′N 78°28′E

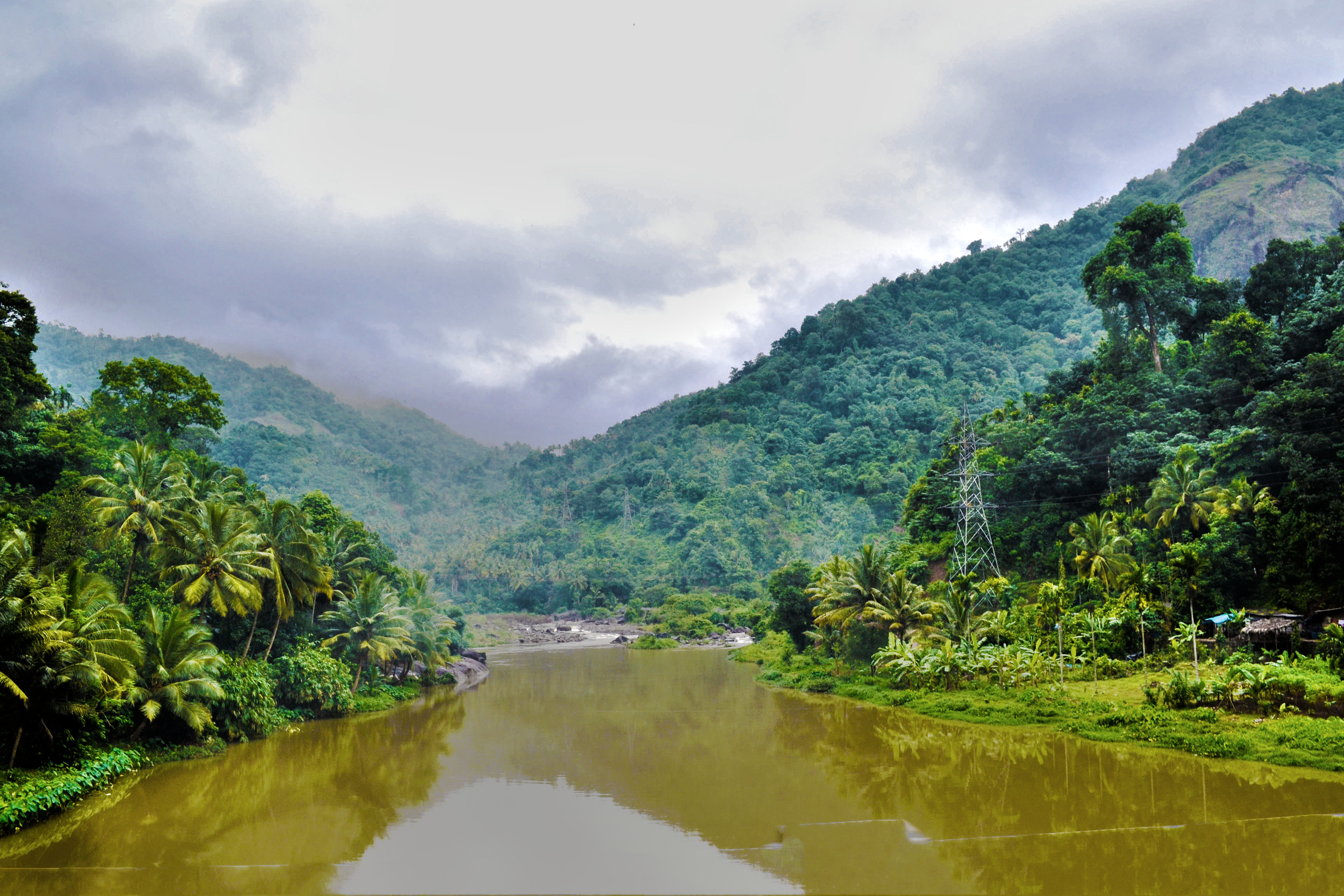
Kallar river

Kallar is the upper tributary of Vamanapuram River flowing through the Indian state of Kerala. The river originates in the Chemunjimotta hills (alt. 1860m) hills on the southern side of the Western Ghats, and flows entirely through Thiruvananthapuram district of Kerala. The Meenmutty Falls and Lower Meenmutty dam are situated in this river.

== See also ==
- List of rivers of Tamil Nadu
