= Kunthipuzha =

River in Kerala, India

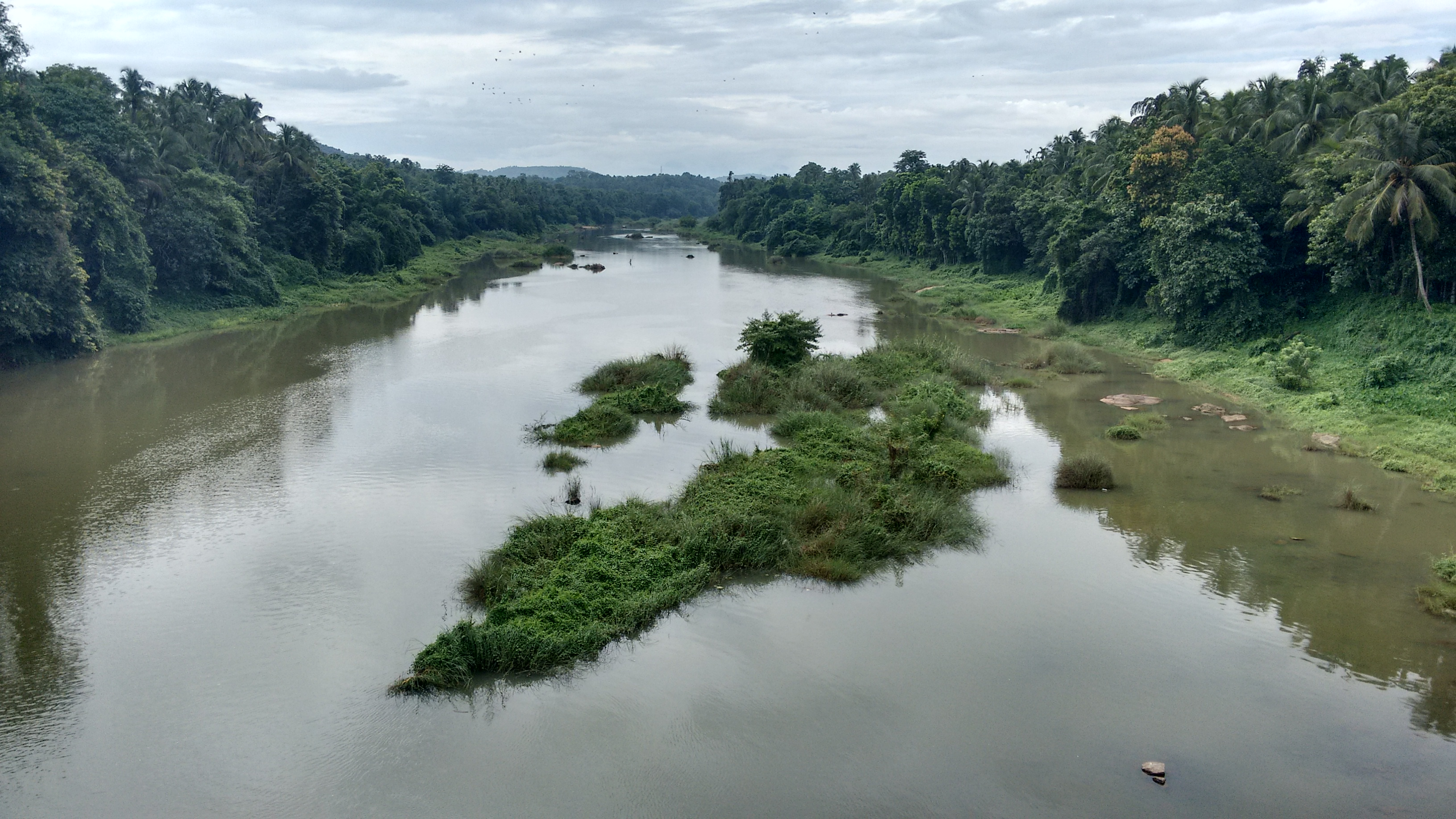
Kunthipuzha

The Kunthipuzha is a waterway located in the state of Kerala, India. It flows through the Silent Valley National Park. This river is also called the Thuthapuzha by the local population. Kunthipuzha is one of the main tributaries of the Bharathapuzha, the second-longest river in Kerala. This river is mainly used by the people of Mannarkkad taluk and Pattambi Taluks of Palakkad district and Perinthalmanna Thaluk of Malappuram District.

== Etymology ==
This river is known for the story of bathing of Kunthi devi, the mother of pandavas and so it is named as Kunthippuzha. Another theory is that Kunthippuzha is the shortened form of "Kunthirikkappuzha" (Malayalam: കുന്തിരിക്കപ്പുഴ). "Kunthirikkam" is the Malayalam word for Boswellia serrata which is a kind of frankincense tree seen in this region. In Mannarkkad region this river is called the Kunthipuzha, while when it reaches Malappuram-Palakkad border, locals call it as Thuthapuzha, after a border town, Officially the river is Kunthipuzha

== Course ==
The Kunthipuzha originates from the Anginda peak in the Silent Valley National Park part of the Western Ghats in Kerala. Initially it flows through the tropical evergreen forests and mountainous terrain of the Silent Valley National Park. Then it enters into the Palakkad plains where it passes several towns namely, Kottopadam, Mannarkad, Kumaramputhur, Karimpuzha, Sreekrishnapuram, Vellinezhi, Thachanattukara, Aliparambu, Marayamangalam, Elamkulam, Pulamanthole, Moorkkanad, Vilathur and Kodumudy. The Kunthipuzha then merges with the Bharathapuzha at Irimbiliyam.

== Other tributaries of the river Kunthipuzha ==
- Nellipuzha
- Kanjirappuzha
- Ambankadavu
- Thuppanadippuzha
