= Kanjirapuzha Dam =

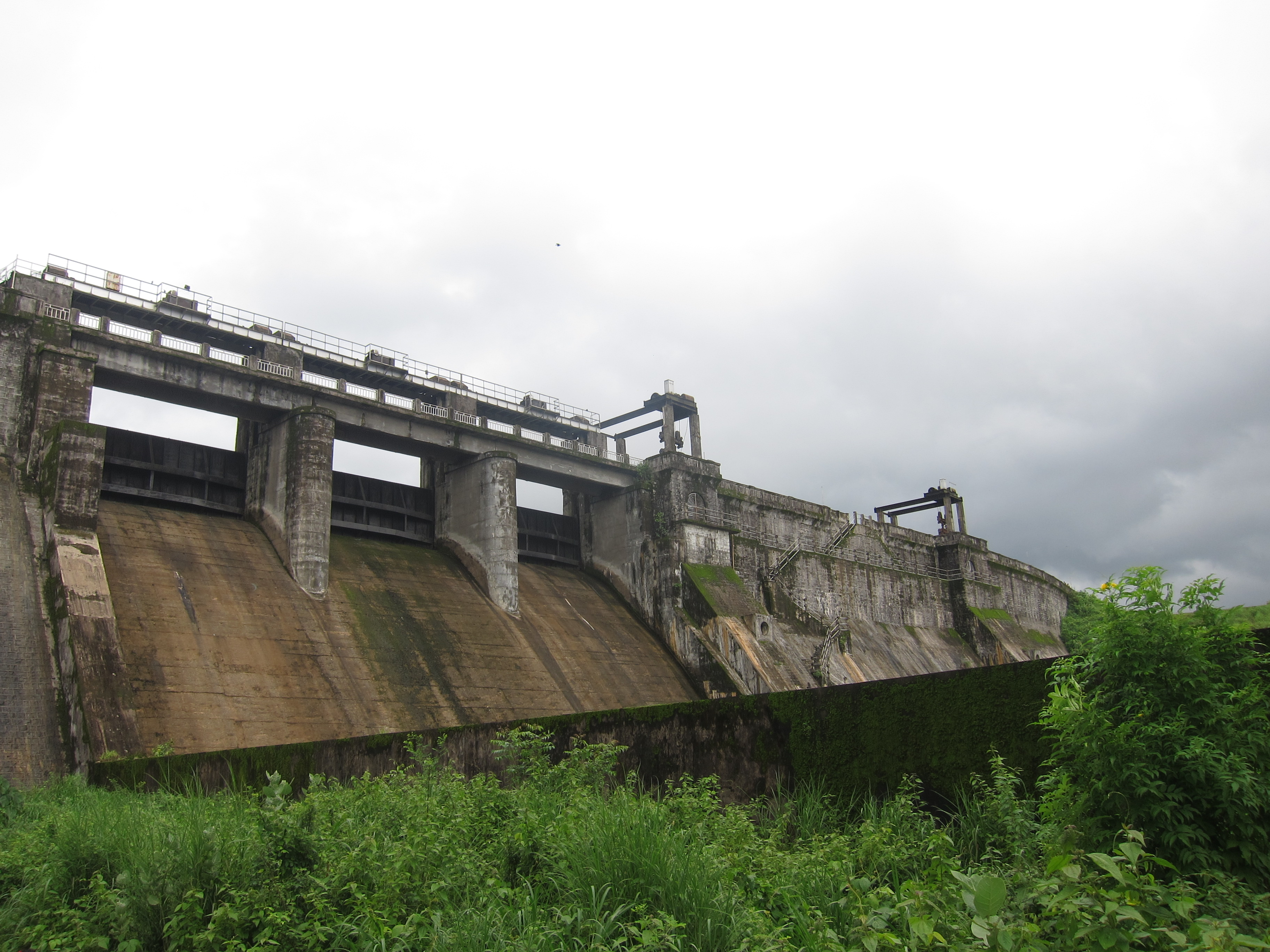
- Kanjirapuzha Dam

- Location within India Location within Kerala
- Location: Mannarkkad, Palakkad District, Kerala, India
- Coordinates: 10°59′9″N 76°32′18″E
- Construction began: 1961
- Opening date: 1995
- Operator: Irrigation Department

Dam and spillways
- Impounds: Kakki tributary
- Height: 30.78 m (101.0 ft)
- Length: 2,127 m (6,978 ft)

Reservoir
- Creates: Kanjirapuzha
- Total capacity: 70.83 MCM
- Catchment area: 7,000 hectares (17,000 acres)
- Surface area: 465 hectares (1,150 acres)
- Normal elevation: 97.54 m (320.0 ft)

The Kanjirapuzha Dam, a masonry earth dam built for providing irrigation to a Cultural Command Area (CCA) of 9,713 hectares (24,000 acres), is located in the Palakkad district in the Indian state of Kerala. The reservoir, which has three islands within it, also has an established commercial fisheries development programme operated by the Fisheries Department.

Construction of the dam, including the irrigation system, was started in 1961 at an initial cost of Rs. 3.65 crores (1954 price level) which was revised to Rs. 101.19 crores (1970 price level). The irrigation command was partially developed in 1980 with a total CCA of 8,465 hectares (20,920 acres). To complete the irrigation development in the entire command a new scheme titled "Extension, Renovation and Modernisation (ERM) Irrigation Project" under the Accelerated Irrigation Benefit Programme (AIBP) initiated by the Prime Minister of India, was approved by the Planning Commission in the year 2008 for an estimated cost of Rs 30.0 crore, to cover balance CCA of 1,247 hectare.

== Geography ==
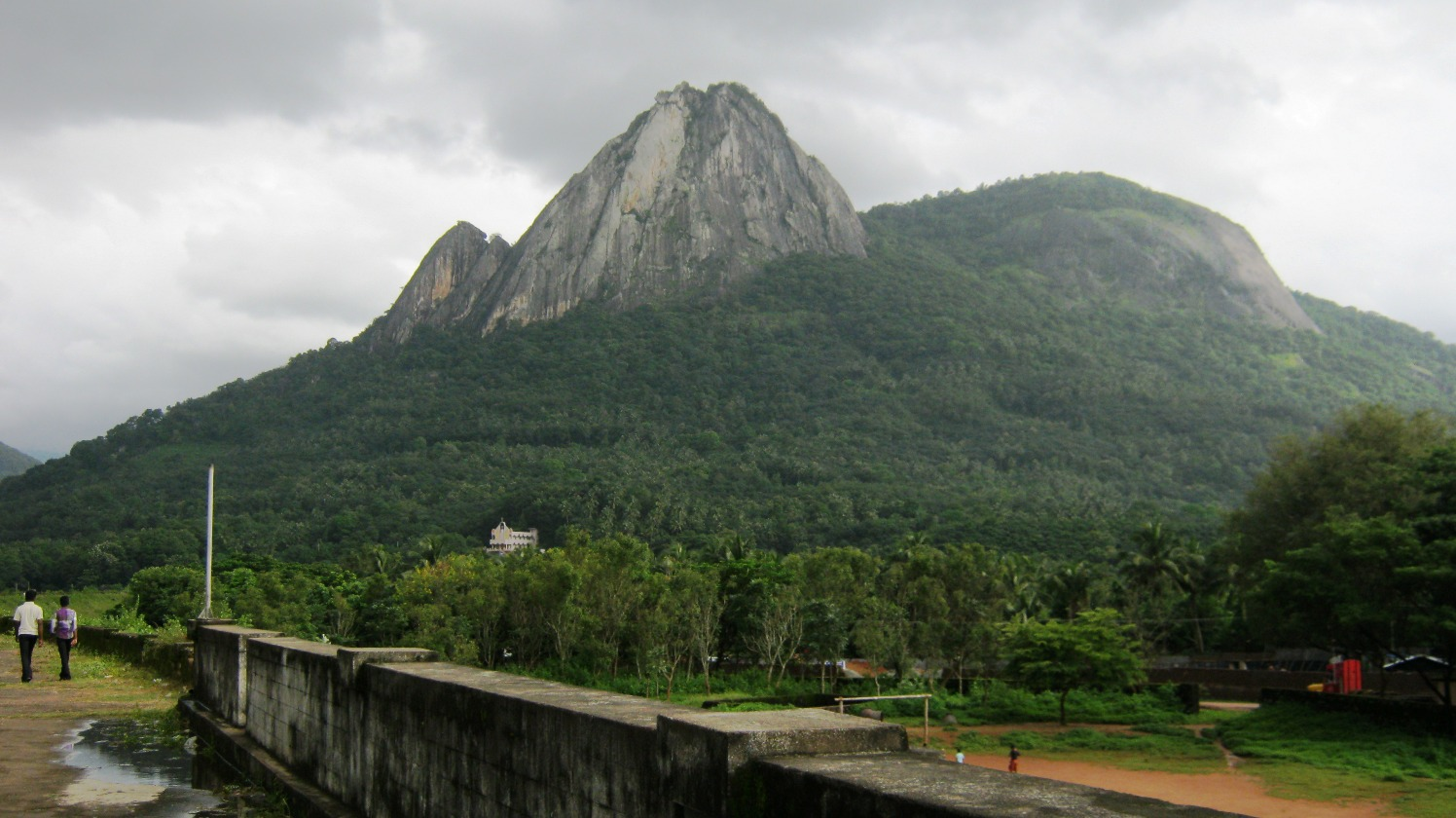
Vadakodan Mala Kanjirapuzha Dam

The Kanjirapuzhan Dam is located on the Kanjirapuzha River, a tributary of the Thuthapuzha River, which itself joins the Bharatapuzha River, a part of the west-flowing rivers from Tadri to Kanyakumari. The dam has a catchment area of 7,000 hectares (17,000 acres), which lies entirely within the state boundary. The densely-covered green forest area of the catchment is called the "Vettilachola".

Mannarkkad, the nearest town to the site of the dam, is 13 kilometres (8.1 mi) away and Palakkad is 43 kilometres (27 mi) away. It is built near to Agali Hills. Vaakkodan mala is another tourist spot.

== Features ==
The project involving an earth masonry dam and irrigation canal system envisages benefits of irrigation to a gross command area of 9,713 hectares (24,000 acres) in the three districts of Palakkad, Mannarkkad and Ottappalam. Commercial fisheries and development of tourism by constructing a garden around the dam are also part of the project.

=== Dam ===
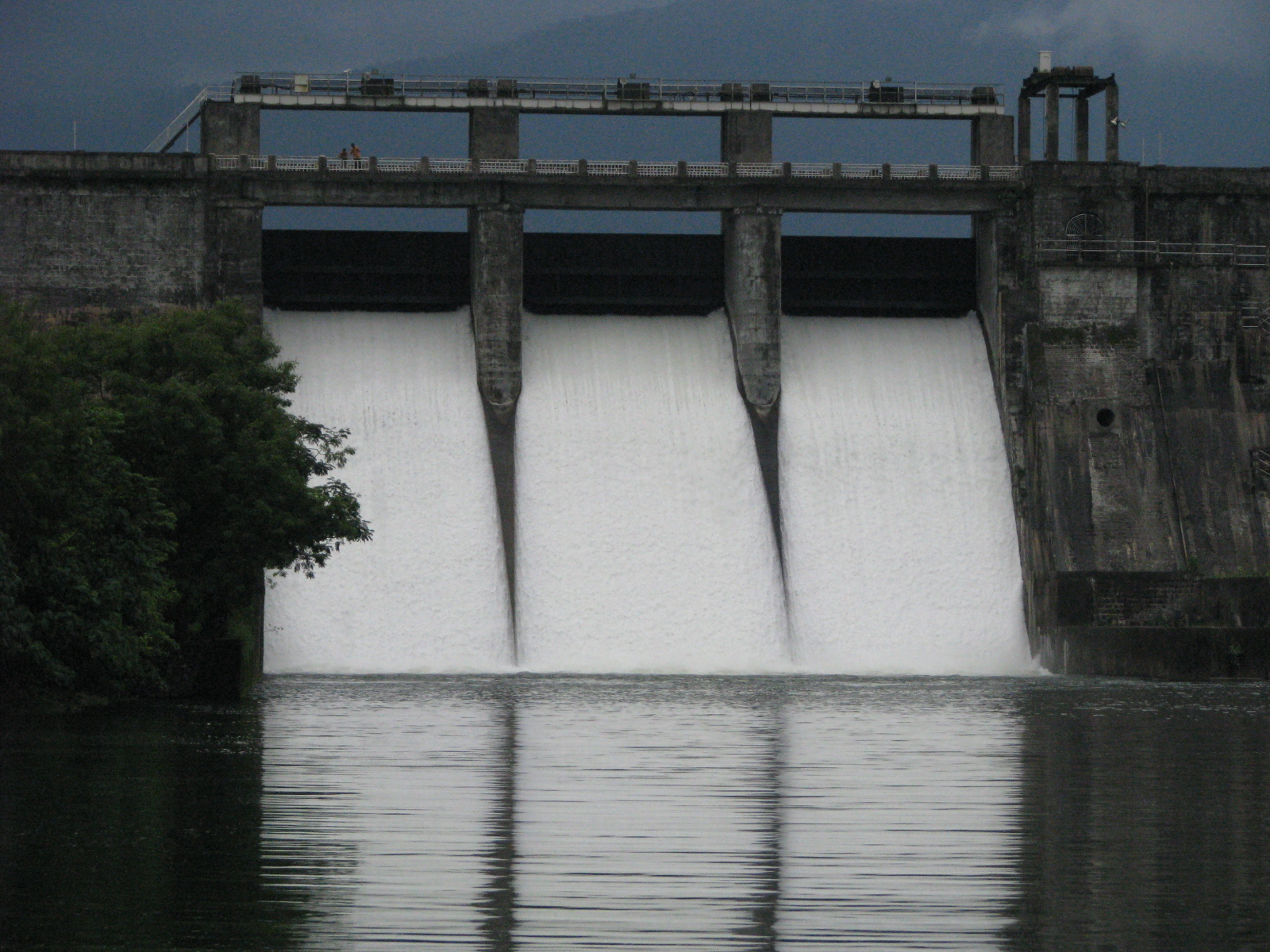
The spillway of the dam

The irrigation project's head works consists of an earth masonry dam of 2,128 metres (6,982 ft) length with the earthen section extending over a total length of 1,896 metres (6,220 ft). The masonry part of this composite dam is 231.60 metres (759.8 ft) in length including the spillway 36.6 metres (120 ft) in length, has a maximum height of 30.78 metres (101.0 ft) above the deepest foundation level. The spillway, which is an Ogee shaped structure, and is designed for passing a flood discharge of 512.5 cubic metres (18,100 cu ft) per second and operated with three gates of 12.20 by 4.574 metres (40.03 ft × 15.01 ft) size fitted over a crest level of EL 92.5 metres (303 ft). The total quantity of material used in the dam is 6,240 TMC. The design of the dam takes into account the seismic factors relevant to Seismic Zone-III. The construction work of the dam was started in 1961 and completed in 1980.

=== Reservoir ===
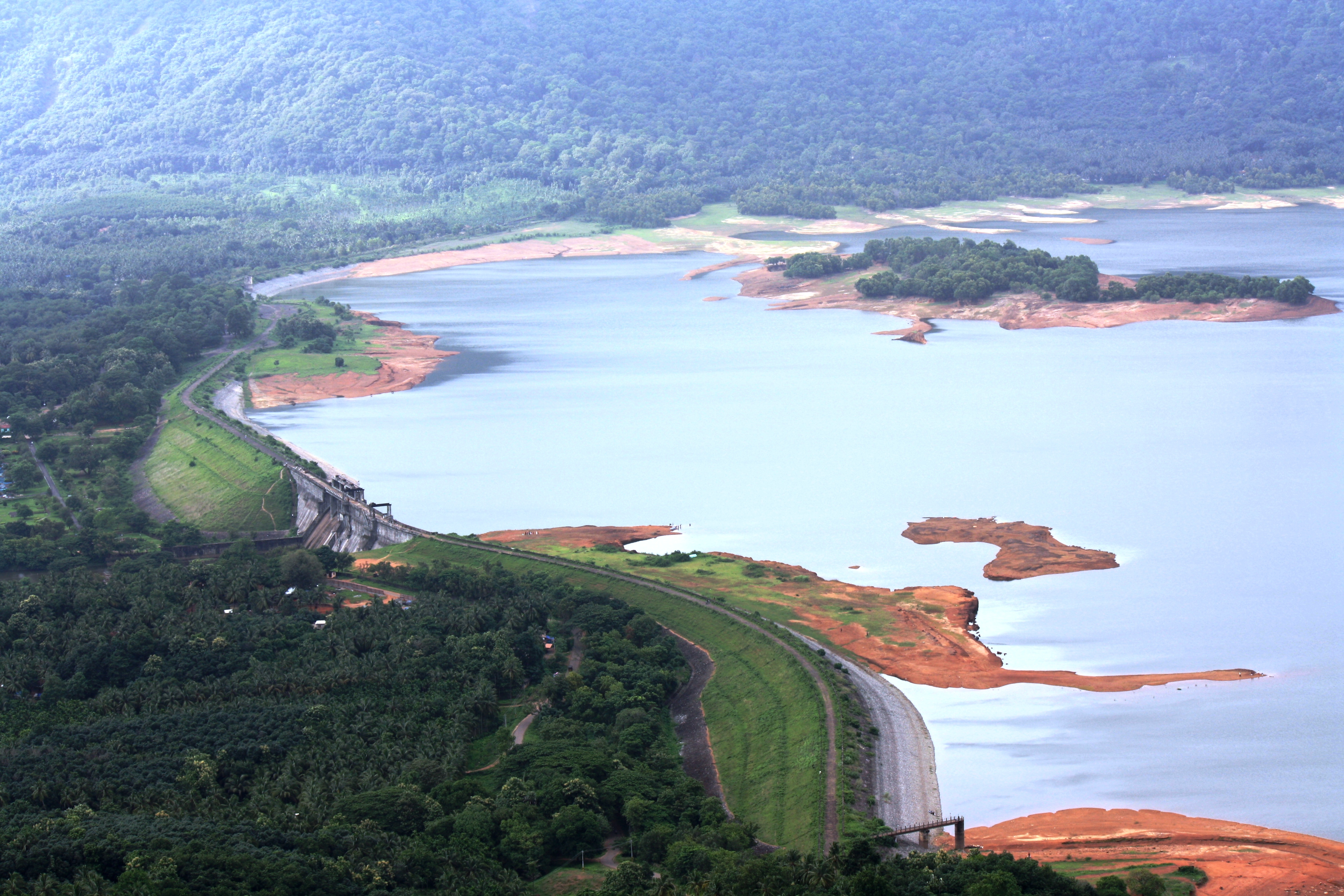
Reservoir water spread

The reservoir created behind the dam has a gross storage capacity of 70.83 million cubic meter at a Full Reservoir Level (FRL) of EL 97.54 m. The live storage between the FRL and Minimum Draw Down Level (MDDL) of EL 77.42 m is 69.23 million cubic meter. The Dead Storage in the reservoir is 11.32 million cubic meter. The area of submergence behind the dam is 465 hectares (1,150 acres). The reservoir caused a submergence of one village resulting in the relocation of 44 tribal community families.

=== Irrigation development ===
Irrigation development under the project envisaged a Culturable Command Area of 9,713 hectares (24,000 acres) covering three districts; an annual irrigation efficiency of 225% was also envisaged to provide irrigation to 21,853 hectares (54,000 acres). Two main canal systems, one on the left bank and the other on the right bank, draw water from the reservoir. The main Right Bank Canal is 9.36 kilometres (5.82 mi) long and is designed to carry a discharge of 2.83 cubic metres (100 cu ft) per sec to bring an area of 1,525 hectares (3,770 acres) (CCA) under its command. The main Left Bank Canal extends over a length of 61.71 kilometres (38.34 mi), has a carrying capacity of 11.33 cubic metres (400 cu ft) per second to provide irrigate benefits to an area of 8,187 hectares (20,230 acres) (CCA). When the project was partially commissioned in 1980 and the total CCA developed was 8,465 hectares (20,920 acres) and with an annual irrigation efficiency of 225% irrigation was provided to cover 19,051 hectares (47,080 acres).

Under a revised ERM project started in 2008–09, the distribution system is being improved to save water and extend the irrigation benefits to the balance CCA of 1,247 hectares (3,080 acres).
