= Meenmutty Falls =

Meenmutty Falls may refer to:

- Meenmutty Falls, Thiruvananthapuram, a waterfall in Thiruvananthapuram district in the Indian state of Kerala
- Meenmutty Falls, Wayanad, a waterfall in Wayanad district in the Indian state of Kerala
