= Lizzie Jacob =

Indian civil servant

Chief Secretary of Kerala
- In office 31 October 2006 – 13 September 2007
- Preceded by: John Mathai
- Succeeded by: P. J. Thomas

Personal details
- Spouse: Babu Jacob
- Profession: Civil servant

Lizzie Jacob is an Indian retired civil servant who served as Chief Secretary of the Government of Kerala from 31 October 2006 to 13 September 2007. She is a 1971-batch officer of the Indian Administrative Service (IAS).

== Career ==
Jacob served in the Government of Kerala in a number of senior administrative assignments. In the early 1980s she served as Director of the state's Directorate of Collegiate Education, with official succession lists recording her tenure from January 1982 to January 1983.

By 2004 she was serving as Principal Secretary in the Government of Kerala's Power Department.

== Chief Secretary of Kerala ==
Jacob became Chief Secretary of Kerala on 31 October 2006 and served until 13 September 2007.

In September 2007 she went on leave and sought voluntary retirement from service, due to public disagreement with Chief Minister V. S. Achuthanandan over the construction of a helipad for a prime ministerial visit at Ponmudi.

== Personal life ==
Jacob is married to IAS officer Babu Jacob, who also served as Chief Secretary of Kerala (2004–2005).
