= Vazhenkada =

- village
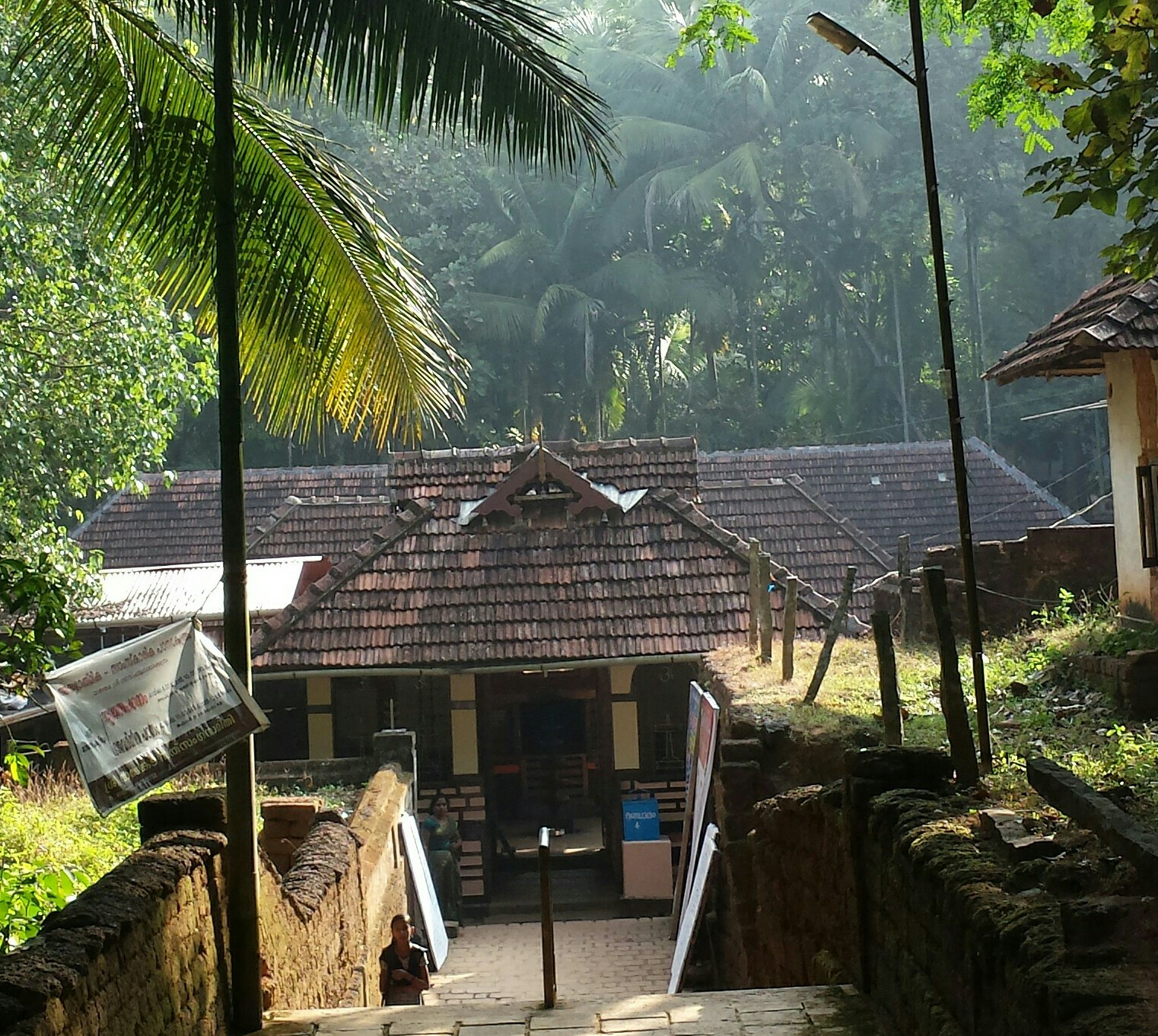
- Interactive map of Vazhenkada
- Coordinates: 10°55′30″N 76°17′45″E
- Country: India
- State: Kerala
- District: Malappuram

Languages
  - Official: Malayalam, English,
- Time zone: UTC+5:30 (IST)
- Postal code: 679357
- Vehicle registration: KL- 10 and KL 53
- Coastline: 0 kilometres (0 mi)
- Climate: Tropical monsoon (Köppen)
- Avg. summer temperature: 38 °C (100 °F)
- Avg. winter temperature: 18 °C (64 °F)

Vazhenkada is a village, known for its Kathakali heritage, on the banks of the river Thootha in Malappuram district of Kerala in southern India. The nearest small towns are Cherpulassery (in Palakkad district) to its south 8 kilometres away and Perintalmanna to its north 12 kilometres away.

== Culture ==
Vazhenkada's place on the cultural map owes largely to having been the native place of eminent Kathakali artiste, Padma Shri Vazhenkada Kunchu Nair, a frontline disciple of the legendary Pattikkamthodi Ravunni Menon. Kunchu Nair's son, Vazhenkada Vijayan, is a Kathakali artiste of repute, having retired from Kerala Kalamandalam, where his father too had worked as a teacher for long. Another of Kunchu Nair's son, P.V. Sreevalsan, is a Kathakali aesthete and author of a Malayalam novel called Keshabharam. Kunchu Nair lived close to the Narasimhamoorthy temple in Vazhenkada.

Other famous Kathakali artistes hailing from Vazhenkada include Kalamandalam Balaraman and Kalamandalam Krishnadas (chenda), Kottakkal Devadas (actor-dancer) and Vazhenkada Anandan (Kathakali musician), besides the late Vazhenkada Govinda Warrier (Kathakali make-up), Vazhenkada Kunjunni Nair, Kalamandalam Rajagopal, Vazhenkada Krishna Warrier and Vazhenkada Rama Warrier.

== Transportation ==
Vazhenkada village connects to other parts of India through Perinthalmanna town. National highway No.66 passes through Tirur and the northern stretch connects to Goa and Mumbai. The southern stretch connects to Cochin and Trivandrum. Highway No.966 goes to Palakkad and Coimbatore. The nearest airport is at Kozhikode. The nearest major railway station is at Shoranur.
