= Vazhenkada Vijayan =

Kathakali dancer

Vazhenkada Vijayan is a senior Kathakali exponent and a retired principal of Kerala Kalamandalam, the performing art institute where he was trained in the classical dance-drama from Kerala in southern India.

== Life ==
A son and disciple of Kathakali artiste Padma Shri Vazhenkada Kunchu Nair, Vijayan is noted for his roles in the categories of the "Virtuous Pachcha", the anti-heroic Kathi and the semi-realistic minukku roles.

Vijayan won the Central Sangeet Natak Academy 2012 award for Kathakali.

A native of Vazhenkada in Malappuram district, he now lives in the Kathakali village of Vellinezhi in Palakkad district. His wife's name is Rajalakshmi.
