= Malleswaran =

Mountain in Kerala, India

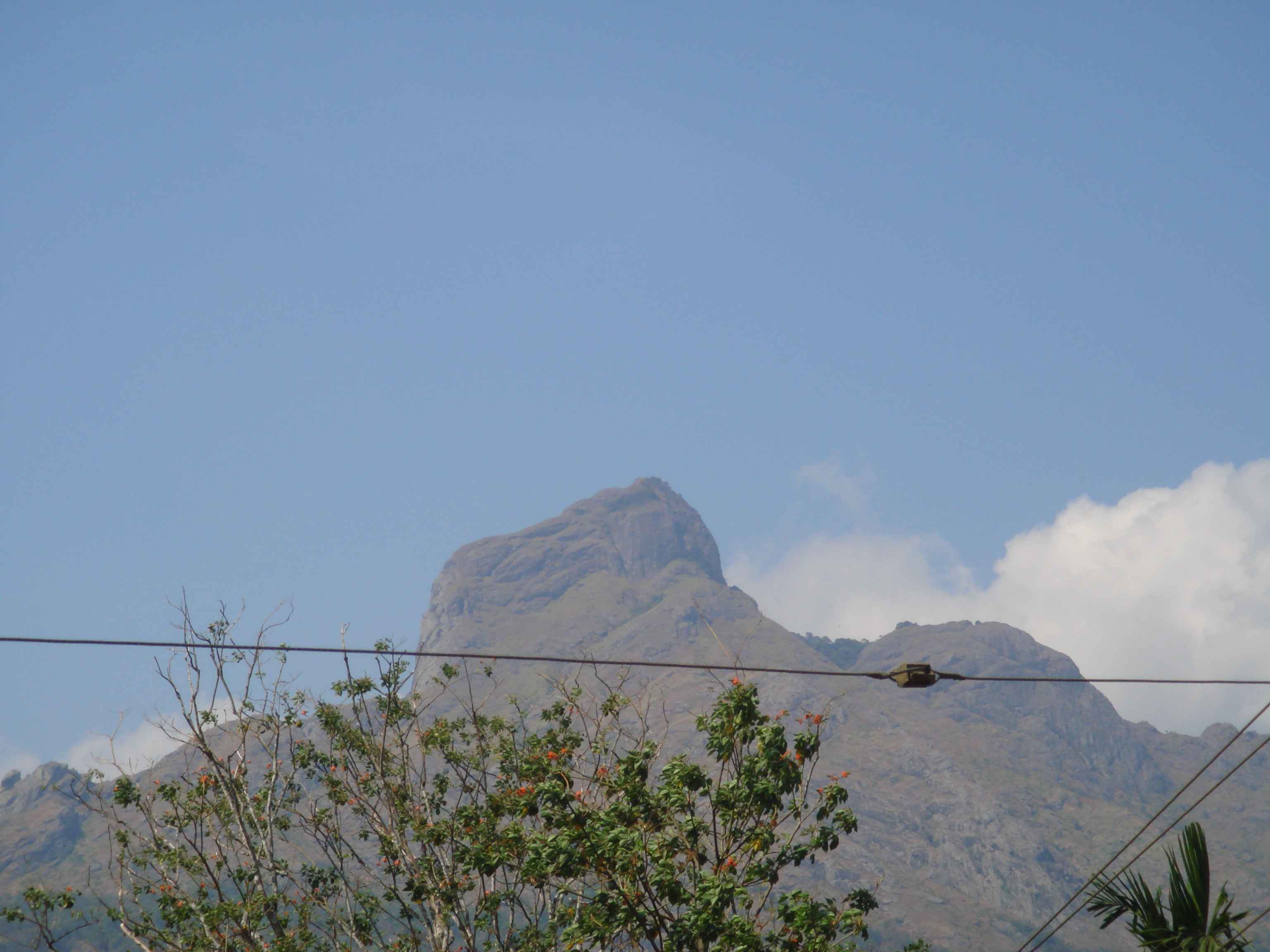
Malleeswaran Mudi

Malleswaran Mudi (മല്ലേശ്വരന്‍ മുടി) is the highest peak in the Attappadi forest reserve in Attappadi Tribal Taluk, Palakkad district, Kerala, India at an elevation of 1,664 meters. It is located at the Agali Hills (അഗളി മലനിരകള്‍) range in the Western Ghats.

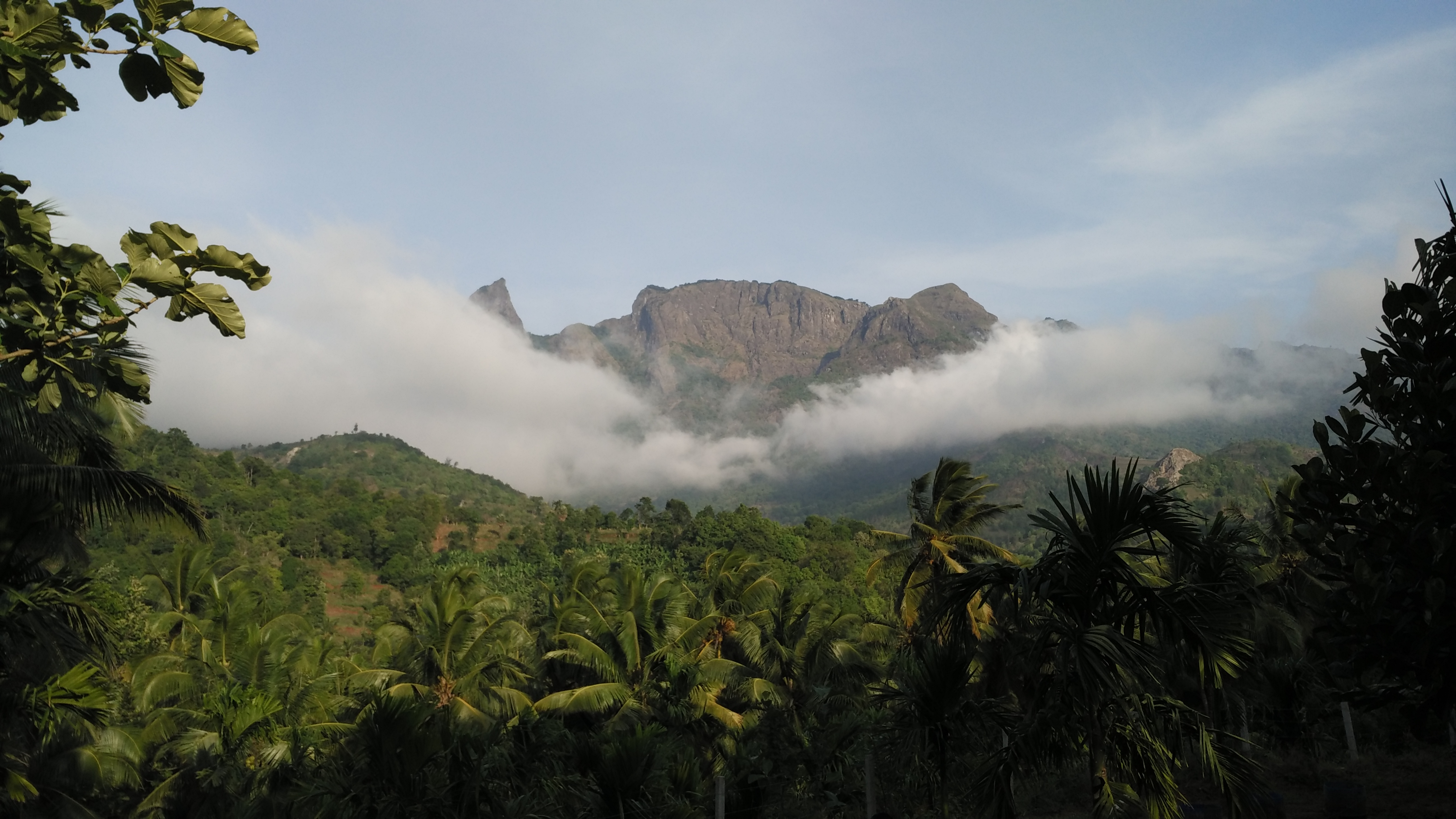
The Malleswaran Hills obscured by clouds.

Mahashivarathri is celebrated at the Malleswaran temple.The peak relesmbles the Hindu God lord Shiva. This peak is worshipped as a big shiva lingam by the tribals with great devotion.

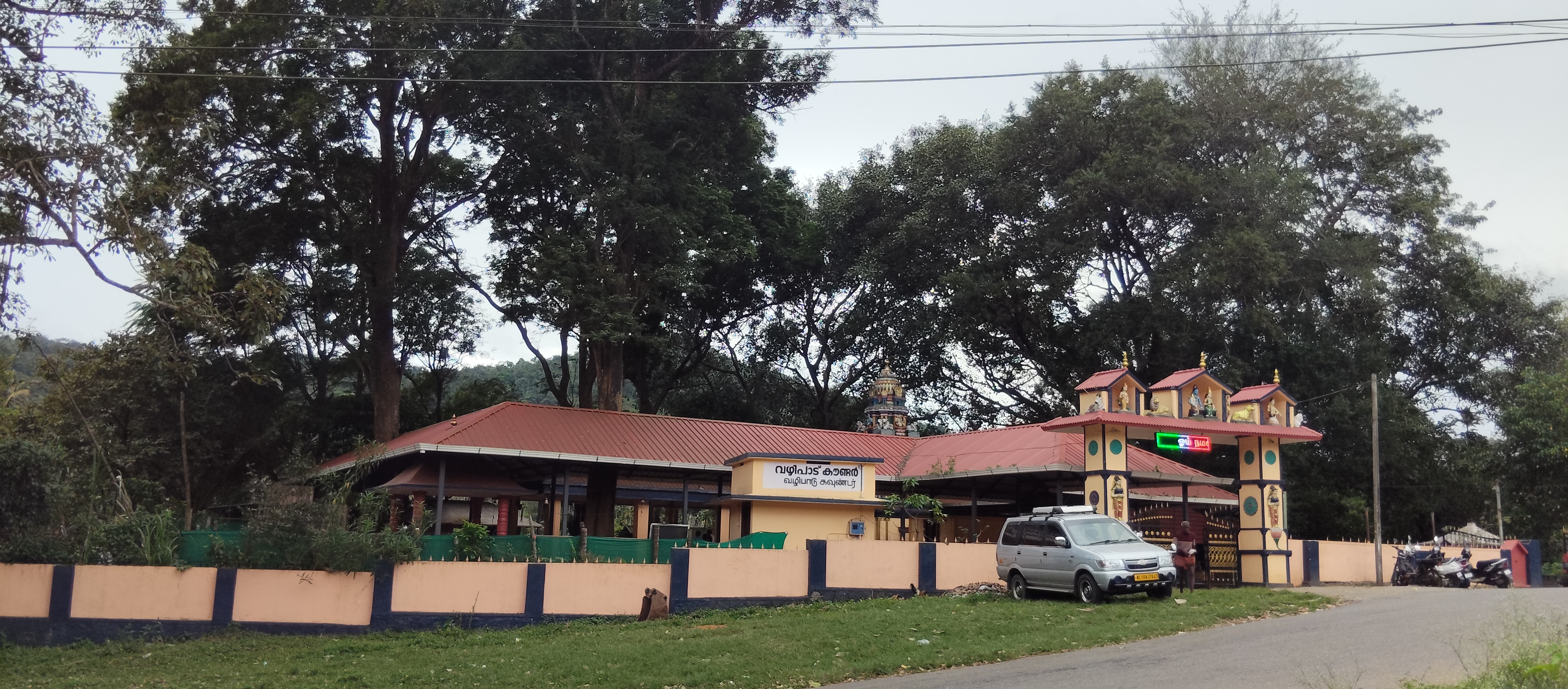

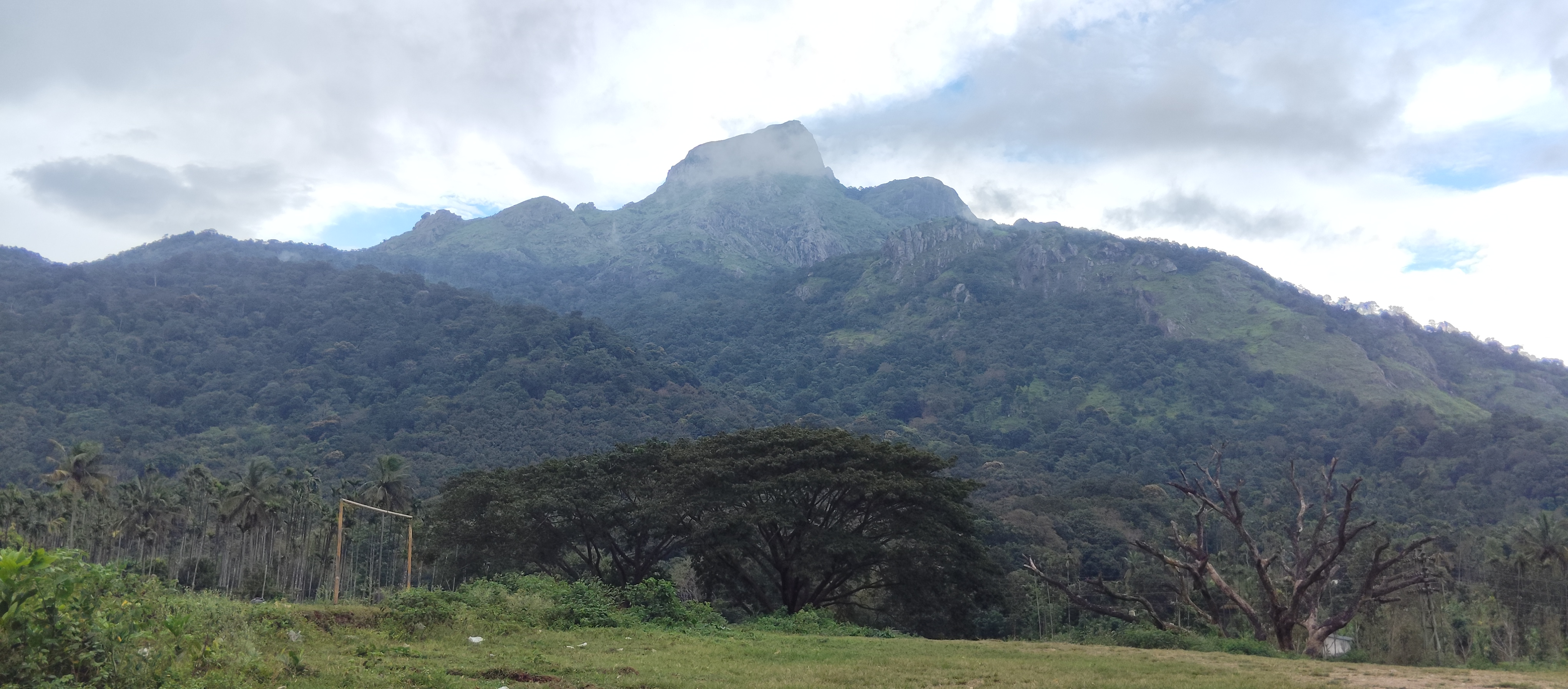
