= Thuppanadupuzha River =

Location
- Country: India
- State: Kerala

Physical characteristics
- Source: Kalladikodan hills
  - location: Palakkad hills
  - elevation: 1099 metres
- Mouth: Thuthapuzha

Basin features
- Progression: Thuppanadupuzha River → Thuthapuzha → Bharathapuzha River
- River system: Bharathapuzha River
- Landmarks: Chenath nair reserve forest

Thuppanadupuzha River is a river in India. It is one of the tributaries of the river Thuthapuzha. The Thuthapuzha is one of the main tributaries of the Bharathapuzha River, the second-longest river in Kerala, south India.

The Thuppanadupuzha originates from the Kalladikodan hills which is 1099 metres high and is a part of the Palakkad hills along the northern lip of the Palakkad Gap. Thuppanadupuzha joins the Thoothapuzha, which in turn empties into Bharathapuzha. Thuppanadupuzha runs close to Chenath nair reserve forest.

== See also ==
- Bharathapuzha - Main river
  - Thuthapuzha - One of the main tributaries of the river Bharathapuzha

== Other tributaries of the river Thuthapuzha ==
- Kunthipuzha
- Kanjirappuzha
- Ambankadavu
