= Ambankadavu River =

Location
- Country: India
- Region: South India

Basin features
- Progression: Thuthapuzha→ Bharathapuzha River
- River system: Bharathapuzha River

Ambankadavu River is one of the tributaries of the river Thuthapuzha which, in turn, is one of the main tributaries of the Bharathappuzha River, the second-longest river in Kerala, South India.

== Other tributaries of the river Thuthapuzha ==
- Kunthipuzha
- Kanjirappuzha
- Thuppanaduppuzha
