= Lower Meenmutty dam =

Diversion dam in Kerala, India

- Country: India
- Status: Operational
- Opening date: 2005

Lower Meenmutty dam is a small dam Constructed across Kallar river in Nandiyodu Panchayath of Thiruvananthapuram District in Kerala, India. Lower Meenmutty weir is constructed as a part of Lower Meenmutty Small Hydro Electric Project. The scheme envisages the development of power by utilizing the water of river Kallar in the Vamanapuram basin. A power plant of 3.5 MegaWatt capacity generates the power using the waters from the dam. After the power generation the water flows to Kallar river and it further flows through Nedumangadu and Chirayinkeezhu.

== Specifications ==
- Latitude : 8⁰ 43′ 00 ” N
- Longitude : 77⁰ 01′ 00” E
- Panchayath : Nandiyodu
- Village : Nandiyodu
- District : Thiruvananthapuram
- River Basin : Kallar ar
- River : Kallar ar
- Release from Dam to river : Kallar ar
- Taluk through which release flows : Nedumangadu, Chirayinkeezhu
- Year of completion : 2005
- Name of Project : Lower Meenmutty SHEP
- Purpose of Project : Hydro Power
- Type of Dam Concrete – Gravity
- Classification Weir
- Maximum Water Level (MWL) : EL 64.50 m
- Full Reservoir Level ( FRL) : EL 62.75 m
- Storage at FRL : 0.326 Mm3
- Height from deepest foundation : 5.75 metres (18.9 ft)
- Length : 55.00 metres (180.45 ft)
- Spillway : Ogee – Overflow section- Ungated
- Crest Level : EL 62.75 m
- River Outlet : 2 Nos. scour pipe 1.0 m diameter

== Tourism around the Dam ==
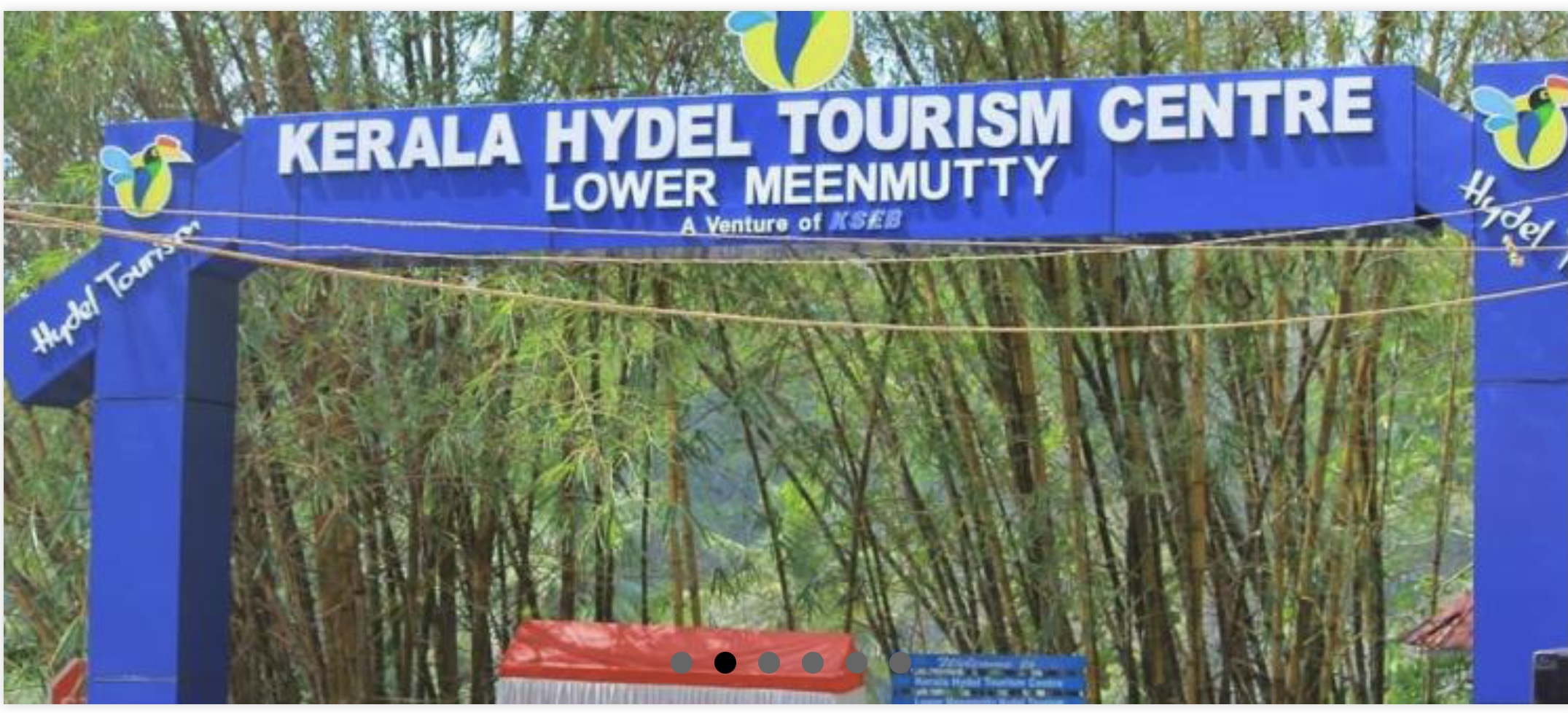
Hydel tourism developed around the dam

Kerala State Electricity Board has developed hydel tourism projects around the dam which attracts tourists. It is located in an eco-friendly place that is surrounded by a forest on one side, situated on the shores of vamanapuram river. The popular activities at this destination includes boating, river rafting, and a travelling ice cream parlour.
