= Kolathur, Kerala =

Kolathur Kuruppathal
- town
- Location in Kerala, India Kolathur (India)
- Coordinates: 10.946269°N 76.139782°E
- Country: India
- State: Kerala
- District: Malappuram

Languages
  - Official: Malayalam, English
- Time zone: UTC+5:30 (IST)
- PIN: 679338
- Telephone code: 04933
- Vehicle registration: KL-53
- Nearest city: Malappuram
- Lok Sabha constituency: Malappuram

Kolathur is a small town in Malappuram district of Kerala, India. It connects Malappuram with Pulamanthole and Perinthalmanna with Valancheri.

== Connectivity ==
The Kolathur-Malappuram road connects the town with the district HQ. The nearest railway station is at Angadippuram. Its one of the major junctions on the way to Thrissur from Malappuram via Pattambi and Valancheri to Nilambur. Nearby towns include Angadippuram, valanchery, Perinthalmanna and Pulamantol.
