= Trivandrum Ponmudi Rope way =

Proposed cable car system in India

The Trivandrum Ponmudi Ropeway is a proposed cable car system to connect Ponmudi hill station, located in the Western Ghats near Thiruvananthapuram, Kerala, India. The project aims to improve access to the region's natural attractions, promote tourism, and support local economic development.

== Background ==
Ponmudi, located approximately 915 meters (3,002 feet) above sea level, is a hill station in the Western Ghats. The area is known for its biodiversity, but access to the hill station is through winding and steep roads leading to the top. The proposed ropeway aims to provide a faster and more accessible mode of transport to the hill station.

The ropeway is planned to start from Breimore, a location near the base of the hill, and extend up to the Ponmudi hill station. This would significantly reduce the travel time compared to the existing winding roads.

== Specifications ==
The ropeway will span approximately 3.6 kilometers (3,602 meters), with an elevation difference of 45.82 meters. This cable car system gives scenic views of the surrounding valleys and hills, enhancing the overall tourist experience.

== Environmental considerations ==
As Ponmudi is located within the Western Ghats, a UNESCO World Heritage Site known for its ecological significance. The ropeway project will comply with environmental regulations and include measures to minimize any adverse impacts on the region's biodiversity.

== Timeline ==
The Trivandrum Ponmudi Ropeway was initially announced in 2017 by the Kerala government as part of its efforts to improve tourism infrastructure in the state. In 2023 the central government listed the project under Parvatmala scheme. As of 2025, the Kerala government is moving forward with further studies to assess the feasibility and implementation of the project. Detailed evaluations, including environmental and social impact assessments, are expected to be carried out in the coming months.
