= Thuthapuzha =

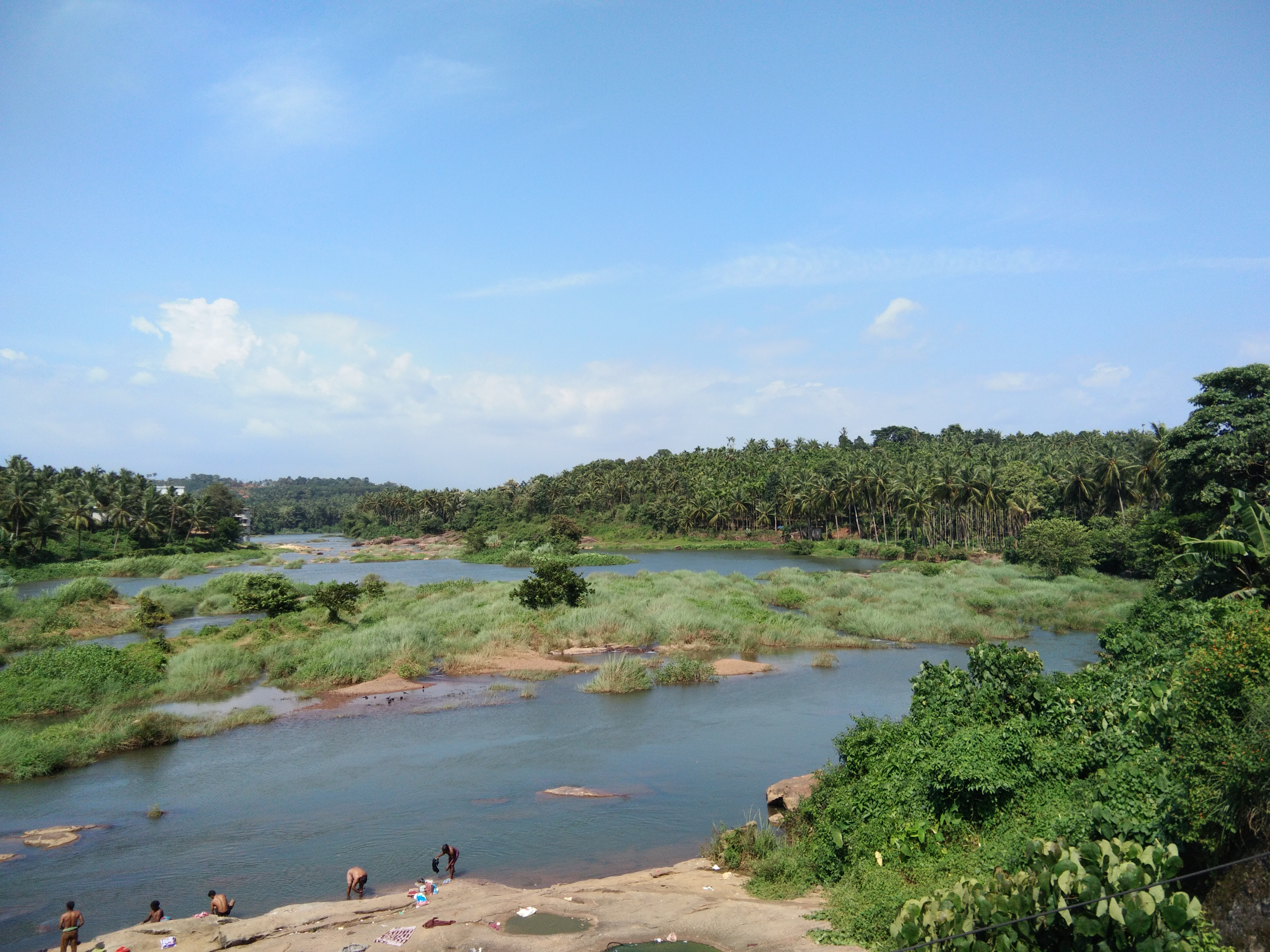
- Thuthapuzha (Thootha) River

Location
- Country: India
- Region: South India
- District: Kerala

Thuthapuzha River is one of the main tributaries of the Bharathapuzha River. The source of the river is in the Silent Valley hills. It flows through Malappuram-Palakkad district border. In Mannarkkad region the river is named as the Kunthipuzha that flows through the Silent Valley National Park. Elamkulam, Thiruvegappura, Veliyakulam and Pulamanthole are places of importance situated on the bank of this river.

== Tributaries ==
There are four main tributaries of the Thuthapuzha River:

- Kunthippuzha
- Kanjirappuzha
- Ambankadavu
- Thuppanadippuzha

== See also ==
- Bharathapuzha
- Gayathripuzha
- Kalpathipuzha
- Kannadipuzha
