= Vamanapuram River =

River in India

Vamanapuram River Kallar, Poovampaarayar, Attingalar Kollampuzhayaru
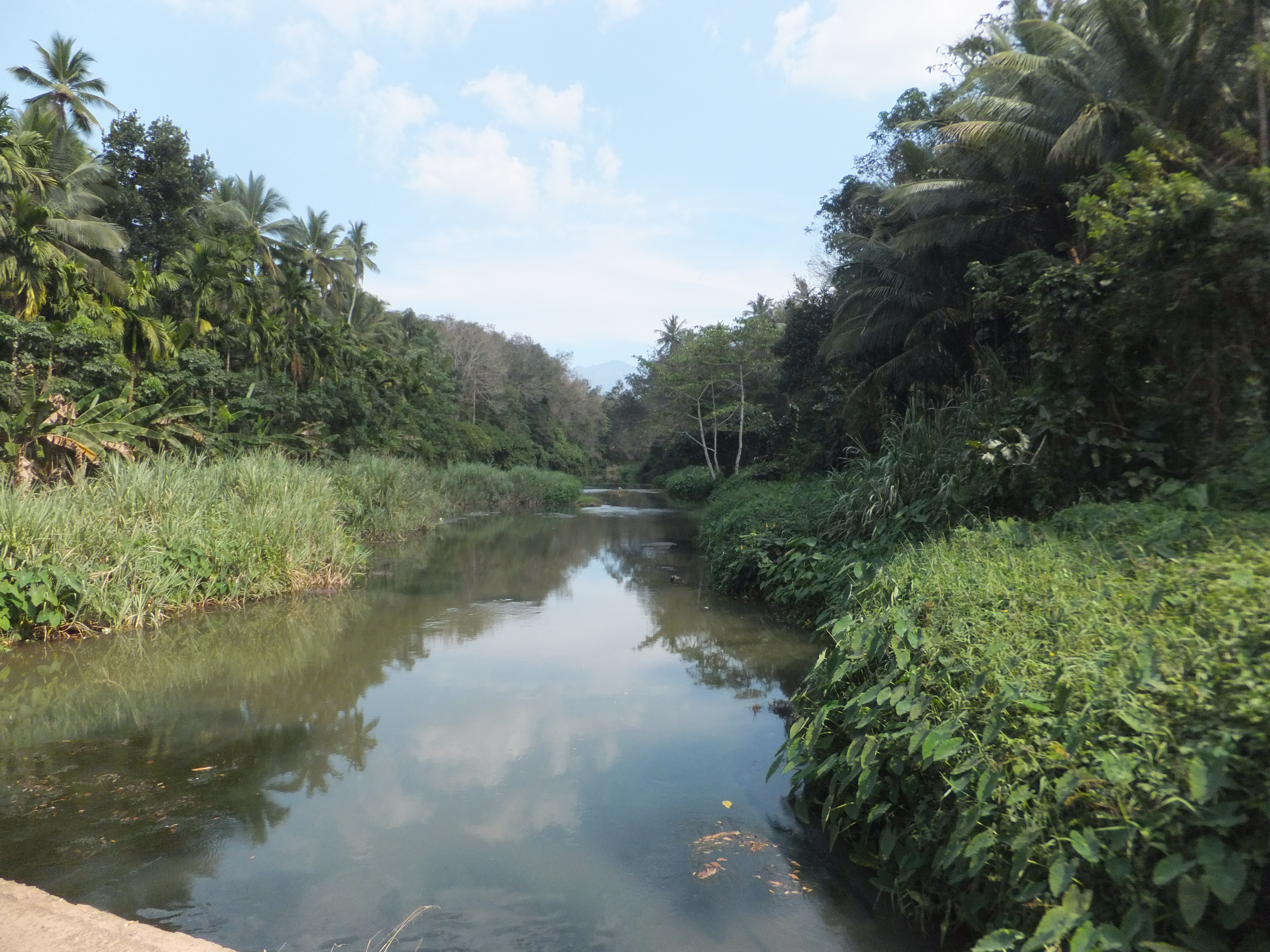
- Native name: വാമനപുരം നദി (Malayalam)

Location
- Country: India
- State: Kerala
- District: Thiruvananthapuram

Physical characteristics
- Source
  - location: Chemunjimotta hills
  - elevation: 1,860 m (6,100 ft)
- Mouth: Anjengo Lake
  - location: Kadakkavoor
- Length: 88 km (55 mi)

Basin features
- Cities: Palode; Vamanapuram; Attingal; Chirayinkeezhu
- Bridges: Kallar bridge; Ponnamchundu bridge; Suryakanthi bridge; Palode bridge; Aanakulam iron bridge; Chellanchy bridge; Cheppilode iron bridge; Aruvipuram bridge; Vellumannady bridge; Vamanapuram bridge; Ayilam bridge; Poovanpara bridge; Kollampuzha bridge; Pulimoottil Kadavu bridge

Vamanapuram River is an 88 km (55 mi) long river in southern Kerala that flows through the northern parts of Thiruvananthapuram district. It is also the longest river in Thiruvananthapuram district. The river is also known as "Kallar", "Kollampuzhayaru" and "Attingalaru".The two tributaries of this river are the Upper Chittar & Manjaprayaar streams which originates near Ponmudi hill station.

== Course ==
The river originates in the Chemunjimotta hills (alt. 1860m) hills on the southern side of the Western Ghats, and flows entirely through Thiruvananthapuram district of Kerala. It course ends in Anjengo Lake (Anchuthengu Lake) near Chirayinkeezhu. The river flows along Attingal municipality, Karette, Palode, Vithura and Kallar. Thiru Aaraattu Kavu Devi Temple, Kollampuzha that is connected with Travancore royal family is situated on the banks of this river.

The Meenmutty Falls at Kallar is situated in the upper course of this river whereas The Mankayam Falls at Idinjar and The Vazhvanthol Falls at Bonacaud lies on its tributaries.

== Significance ==
The river is a major source of water for Municipalities of Attingal and Varkala. There is boating available in the lower course of river near Chirayinkeezhu. There is considerable tourism activities in the upper course of river especially at Meenmutty Falls and Thavakkal waterfalls.

=== Vamanapuram Irrigation Project ===
It was envisaged in 1970's but couldn't materialize due to opposition from people. It is the only river in the district without a dam and there are currently plans to build a regulator in the river by Kerala Water Authority.
