= Agali Hills =

- village
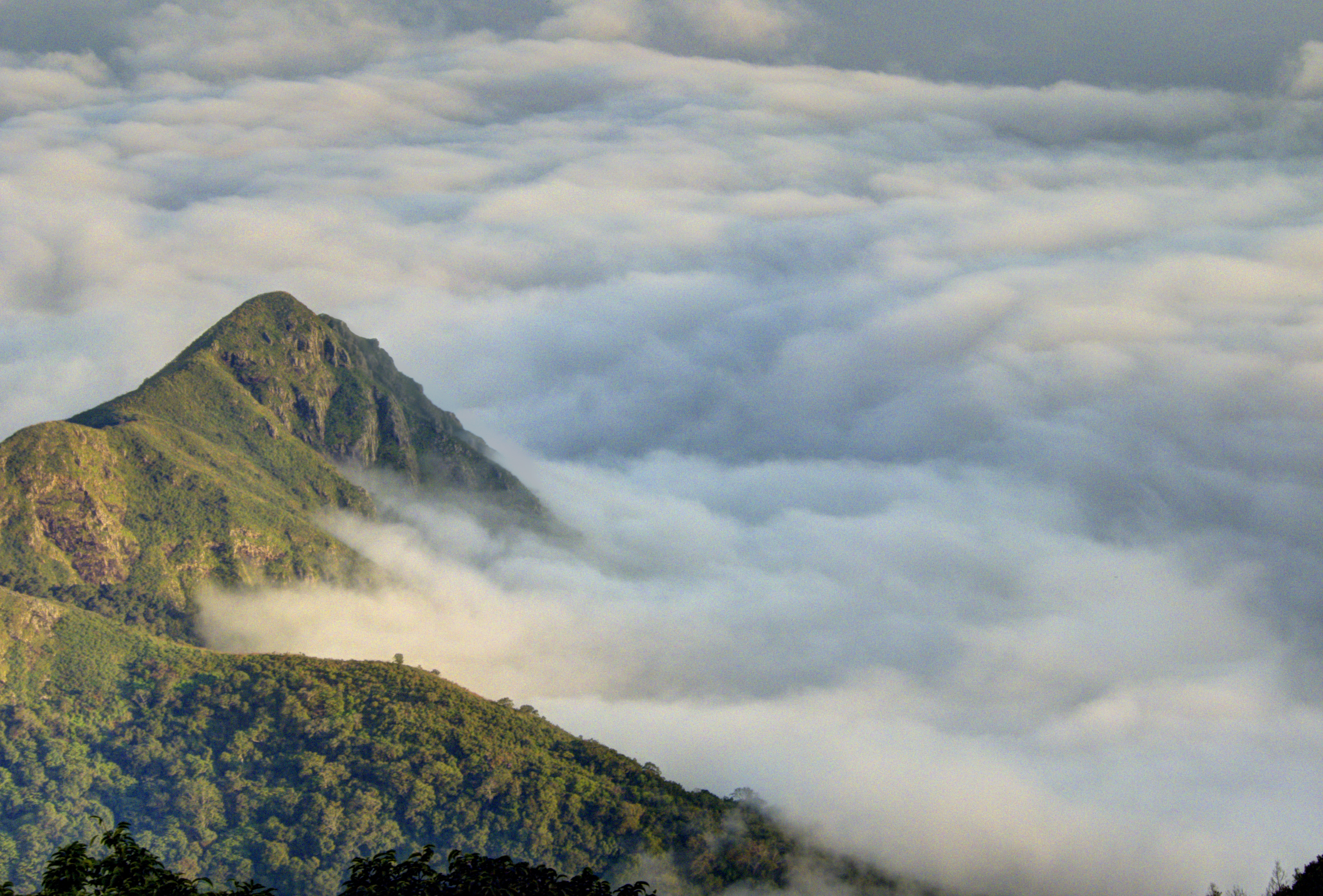
- Attapadi Hills

- Location in Kerala, India Agali Hills (India)
- Coordinates: 11°06′21″N 76°39′13″E
- Country: India
- State: Kerala
- District: Palakkad

Government
  - Type: Gram Panchayat

Languages
  - Official: Malayalam, English
- Time zone: UTC+5:30 (IST)
- Vehicle registration: KL-50

Agali Hills (Attapadi Hills) is a small tribal village and hill station in the Palakkad district of Kerala, India. It lies at the base of Malleswaran Peak and is situated in the Attappadi forest reserve, bordering Silent Valley National Park.
