= Maravamangalam =

- Village panchayat
- Location in Tamil Nadu, India Maravamangalam (India)
- Coordinates: 9°46′0.8″N 78°38′23.93″E
- Country: India
- State: Tamil Nadu
- District: Sivaganga

Languages
  - Official: Tamil
- Time zone: UTC+5:30 (IST)
- PIN: 630554
- Telephone code: 04575

Maravamangalam is a Major panchayat village in Sivaganga district in the Indian state of Tamil Nadu. Maravamangalam is a part of Kalayarkovil taluk in the Sivaganga district.

== Geography ==
MARAVA MANGALAM Village or MARAVA MANGALAM Panchayat is situated in Sivaganga District. Agriculture is the main profession of this village. Still this village is waiting for Industrial development. Education, Drinking water, Road and Electricity are the main concern of this village.

== History ==
Maravar Mangalam (now Maravamangalam) is a town near KalaiyarKoil where the Maruthu brothers army was kept. There were many soldiers in this town in the war against the white man have died. A shrine has been cut in their memory in this town. The name of that pond is 'kulu manda urani'(குழு மாண்ட ஊருணி). Even today, that village is a witness of history in Maravamangalam.
