= Kanjirappuzha (Nilambur) =

River in Kerala, India

Kanjirappuzha (കാഞ്ഞിരപ്പുഴ) is a small tributary of the Chaliyar river in Nilambur taluk of Malappuram district in Kerala, India. The river originates from the mountain region which lies between Malappuram and Kozhikode districts. The river flows through Chaliyar Panchayath in Malappuram district and ultimately join to Chaliyar near Chaliyarmukku where Karimpuzha also meet Chaliyar. The Adyanpara Waterfalls are on the river.
