= Pulamantol =

Pulamanthole
- Census Town
- Location in Kerala, India Pulamanthole (India)
- Coordinates: 10.93°N 76.18°E
- Country: India
- State: Kerala
- District: Malappuram
- Taluk: Perinthalmanna

Government
  - Type: Gram Panchayat
  - Body: Pulamanthol Grama Panchayat
  - Panchayat President: Sudha Pottipara (IUML)

Area
  - Total: 32.1 km^{2} (12.4 sq mi)

Population
  - Total: 29,603
  - Density: 922/km^{2} (2,390/sq mi)

Languages
  - Official: Malayalam, English
- Time zone: UTC+5:30 (IST)
- PIN: 679323
- Telephone code: 04933
- Vehicle registration: KL-10, KL- 53
- Lok Sabha constituency: Malappuram
- Niyama Sabha constituency: Perinthalmanna
- Block division: 14 - Pulamanthole; Perinthalmanna Block Panchayat
- Climate: tropical (Köppen)
- Website: pulamantholepanchayat.lsgkerala.gov.in

Pulamanthole is a village and a panchayat in Malappuram district of Kerala, India. It is situated on the banks of the Kunthippuzha (also called Thoothappuzha). The river separates Malappuram and Palakkad districts, a new bridge has been built across it recently.

One road leading to Kolathur connects Pulamanthole to Valancheri and Malappuram. The nearest towns are Perinthalmanna (12 km) and Pattambi (11 km). State Highway - 39 connecting Perumpilavu with Nilambur pass through Pulamanthole. There is one higher secondary school and four primary schools. Alanchery Bhagavathy Kshethram is near to the Thootha river (here it is called the Pulamanthole river). Another famous temple here on the riverside is the Rudra Dhanvanthari Kshethram. This temple is the family temple of the famous Ashta vaidya family of Pulamanthole Mooss (Dhanvanthari is the God who is considered as the originator of Ayurveda, the Indian medical system). This family is also residing on the banks of the river.

== GHSS Pulamanthole ==
It is a higher secondary school situated in Paloor.

== Pulamanthole Mana ==
Pulamanthole Mana is an Ayurvedic treatment centre based on Ashtavaida, a wing of Ayurveda science. The Mana belongs to a Mooss family. This family has its own temple: Pulamanthole Sree Rudra Dhanvanthari Temple. The head of the Mana is Sankaran Mooss.

== Sree Rudra Dhanyanthwary Temple ==
A temple situated in Pulamanthole on the banks of Kunthipuzha.

== Surya Kalady Mana ==
The mythical origin of Surya Kalady Mana dates back to the Lord Parasuraman era. Many famous literary works including Ithihyamala, Kerala Sahitya Charitham and Surya Kalady are the products of Surya Kalady Mana.

== Transportation ==
Pulamanthol village connects to other parts of India through Perinthalmanna town. National highway No.66 passes through Tirur and the northern stretch connects to Goa and Mumbai. The southern stretch connects to Cochin and Trivandrum. Highway No.966 goes to Palakkad and Coimbatore. The nearest airport is at Kozhikode. Nearest railway stations are Pattambi and Angadipuram. The nearest major railway station is at Shornur.
