= Meenmutty Falls (Thiruvananthapuram) =

Waterfall in Kerala, Indian

Meenmutty Falls is a waterfall located 45 km (28 mi) from Trivandrum city in Thiruvananthapuram District in the Indian state of Kerala, India. The falls are located near the Ponmudi hill station, Thiruvananthapuram district and Agastya Mala Biosphere reserves. This waterfalls is situated along the upper riparian course of Vamanapuram River.

== Location ==
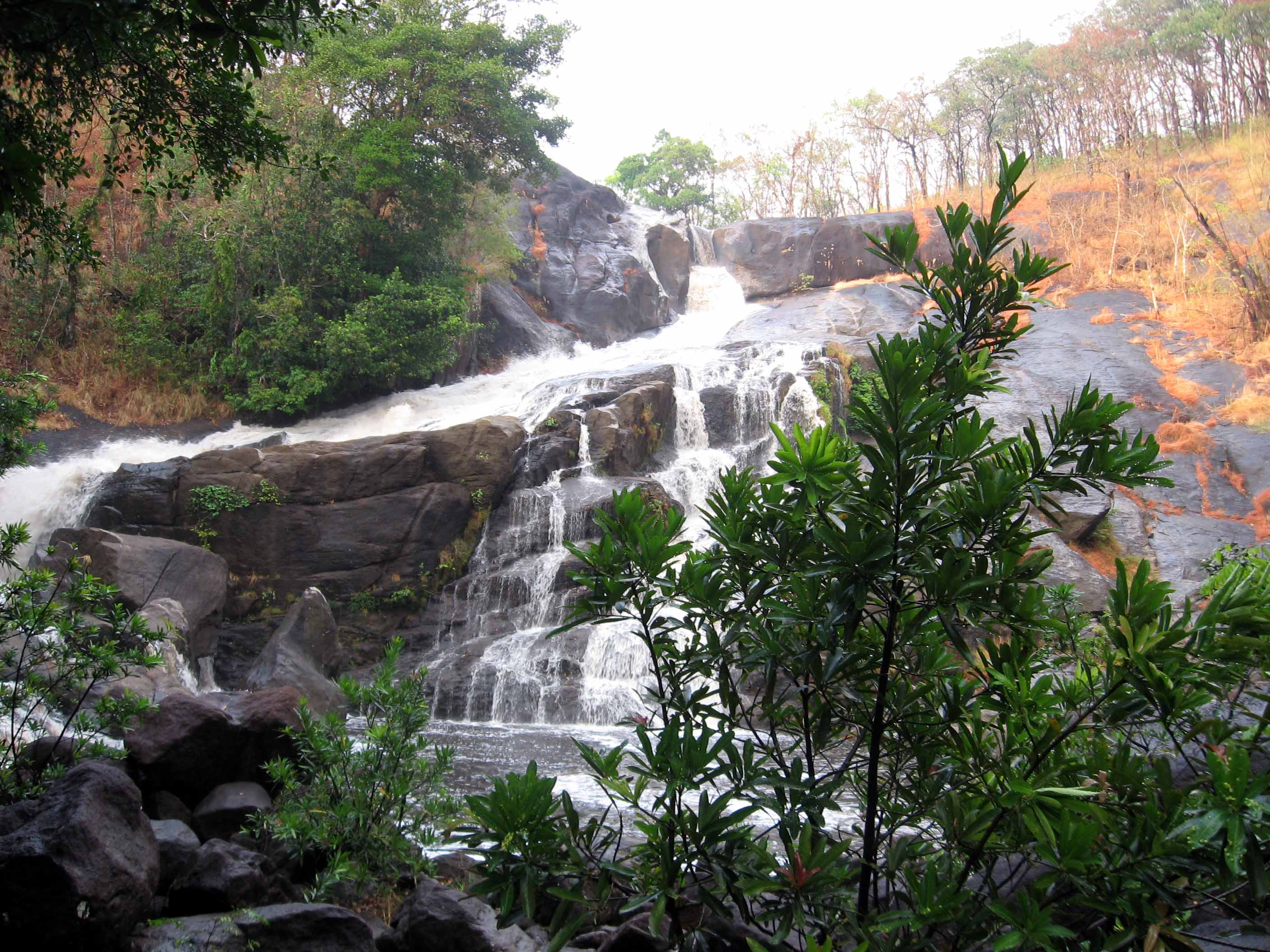
Meenmutty Waterfalls

There is no transportation is available so visitors have to trek 2 km through the dense forests to reach the falls. The nearby road head is Kallar on Vithura- Ponmudi road. There are other waterfalls like Kombaikani Falls (that lies 2 kilometres (1.2 mi) upstream of the Meenmutti Falls), Thavakkal Waterfalls and Vaazhvanthol waterfalls nearby this falls.

There is also a waterfall bearing same name that exist at Wayanad district of Kerala.

== See also ==
- List of waterfalls
- List of waterfalls in India
- Peppara Wildlife Sanctuary
- Agastya Mala
