= Ponmudi =

Hill station, Town in Kerala, India

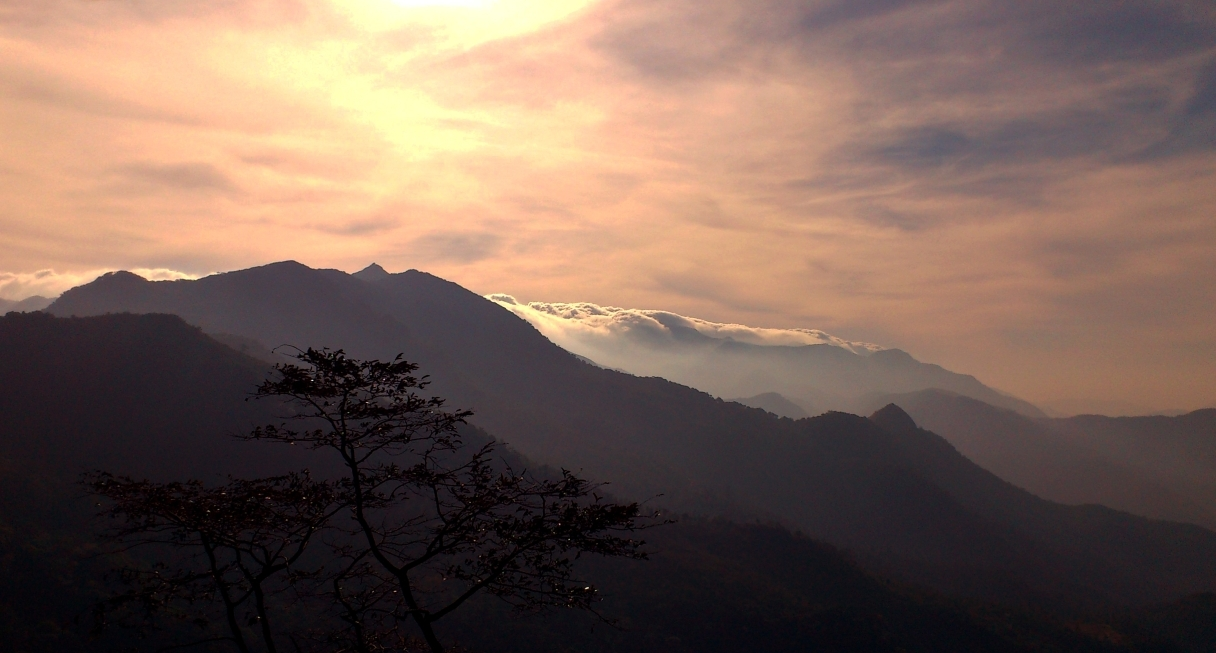
- Morning view from Ponmudi

Highest point
- Elevation: 1,100 m (3,600 ft)
- Coordinates: 8°45′37″N 77°07′00″E

Naming
- Language of name: Malayalam

Geography
- Location within Kerala Location within India
- Location: Peringamala, Vithura Thiruvananthapuram district, Kerala, India
- Parent range: Western Ghats

Climbing
- Easiest route: Hike

Ponmudi (the Golden Peak) is a hill station in the Peringamala gramapanchayath of Thiruvananthapuram district of Kerala in India. It is located 22km west of Vithura town, 53 km north-east of Thiruvananthapuram City, 78 km south-east of Varkala town and 69 km north-east of Kovalam Beach at an altitude of 1,100 m (3,600 ft). Ponmudi (Varayadumotta) peak is a part of the Western Ghats mountain range that runs parallel to the Arabian Sea. Ponmudi is a popular honeymoon destination in South India. The normal temperature of Ponmudi is between 14 and 25 °C (57 and 77 °F). During the winter season, the temperature drops between 10 and 19 °C (50 and 66 °F) especially during the night time. The lowest temperature in Ponmudi ever recorded is 8°C.

== Attractions ==
Ponmudi is connected to Thiruvananthapuram by a two-lane highway (SH2 & SH 45). The last 18 km starting from Anapara has scenic views, as it winds through the mountains and tea gardens. The travel along this stretch provides a scenic experience, as drivers and riders must navigate 22 Hairpin turns. Ponmudi is also a popular spot for backpacking and trekking. The climate is pleasant year-round.

Other attractions near Ponmudi include Golden Valley and a number of rivulets and rapids, some even across the road. The lush forest area has tropical vegetation. A variety of wildlife inhabit the hills. The Golden Valley offers vistas of the hills and access to the Kallar River. Flowing through a wilderness area, it has rounded pebbles, cool water, fish, and lush green trees.

Some notable tourist attractions located in Ponmudi are Peppara Wildlife Sanctuary, Echo Point and various trekking spots. Mist-laden valleys, especially Golden Valley near Kallar River, also draw tourists. Travelers can find a deer park and wood and stone cottages coloured in bright hues. Located about 1.5 km from the hill station, is the Ponmudi Falls. Around 3 km from the Ponmudi Resort, is the Deer Park. The Meenmutty Falls, another tourist attraction of the region, is about 3 km from the Kallar Main Road. Peppara Wildlife Sanctuary, located on the outskirts of Ponmudi, is a preserve spread across 53 km^{2} (20 sq mi) and accommodates a variety of wild animals and birds like Asian elephants, sambar, leopards, lion-tailed macaques, Malabar grey hornbills, etc.

Another main attraction in the region is Agasthyarkoodam, one of the highest peaks in the Western Ghats, with the highest peak at 1868 m. This peak is known for its wilderness, and can be accessed only with the Forest Department's permission. Agasthyamalai Biosphere Reserve is another attraction covering Neyyar, Peppara, Shendurney Wildlife Sanctuaries and divisions of Achencoil, Thenmala, Konni, Punalur, and Thiruvananthapuram

== Ecology ==
The landscape of Ponmudi is an interspersing of valleys and hills with forestland and plantations. Ponmudi is having an extensive importance of biodiversity, which plays a major role in maintaining the ecological balance of the area. Ponmudi is host to 283 species of birds, many of which are endangered and threatened. Birds endemic to this region include the painted bush quail, the Malabar grey hornbill, the Wayanad laughingthrush, the broad-tailed grass bird and the Nilgiri pipit. The grasslands of Ponmudi are the breeding grounds of the broad-tailed grass bird, a threatened species. Fifty-nine per cent of the 483 bird species in Kerala are found at Ponmudi. Of the 16 species of birds endemic to the Western Ghats, 15 are at Ponmudi. Of the 332 species of butterflies in the Western Ghats, 195 are found here. Of the 37 butterfly species endemic to the Ghats, 24 are found at Ponmudi. The spot puffin, a rare butterfly, has been sighted at the Kulachikarai-Panayam-Merchiston area where ISRO's land comes. Similarly, Ponmudi is also host to many species of reptiles and amphibians, including the highly endangered Travancore tortoise, the Malabar Gliding Frog and the Malabar tree toad. Nilgiri tahr is also found in Ponmudi hill top.

== Kallar and Menmutty Falls ==
Kallar situated en route to the hill station of Ponmudi, Kallar gets its name from the River Kallar, which flows through the region. Kallu means 'stone' and Aru means 'river', hence the name Kallar. The river is well known for its abundance of attractive, round-shaped boulders and pebbles, especially in the upper reaches and middle portion of its course. Here one can take a dip in the crystal clear waters to cool off, and also watch the many rapids and small pools that dot a good part of the river in this area.

Meenmutty Falls, Thiruvananthapuram is one of the main attractions located nearby Ponmudi hills and is around 45 km from Thiruvananthapuram. This waterfall is about 3 km away from the Kallar-Ponmudi road. The main attractions are waterfalls and the small natural pools and rocks located beside the way to the waterfalls. In order to reach the place, one has to take a long trek that passes through dense forests, upon taking special permission from the Forest Department. A guide will be sent along with tourist groups to the falls. Facilities for trekking are easily provided at Kallar Vana Samrakshana Samithi, which is a forest protection group at Kallar.

== Gallery ==
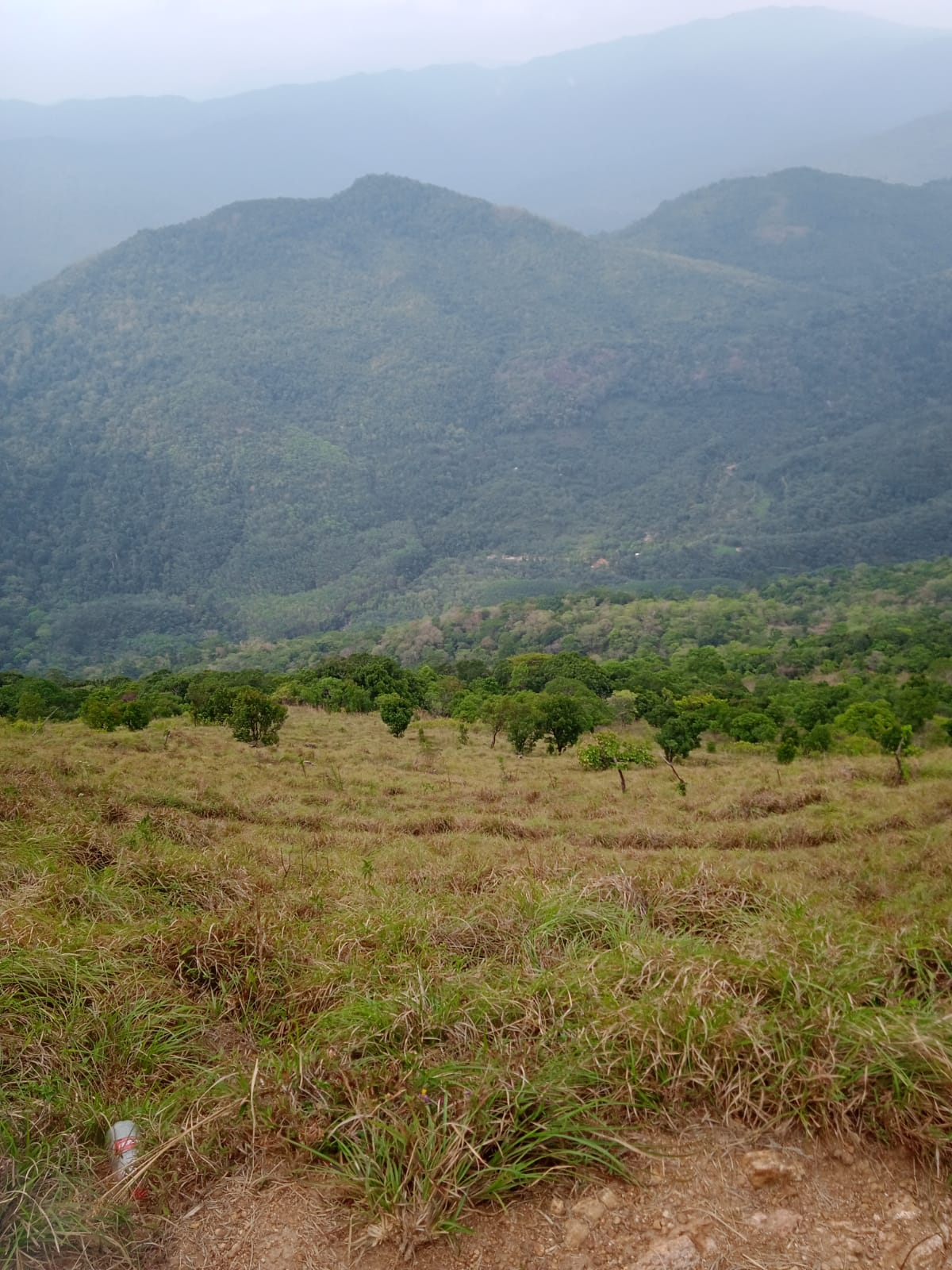
View from Ponmudi

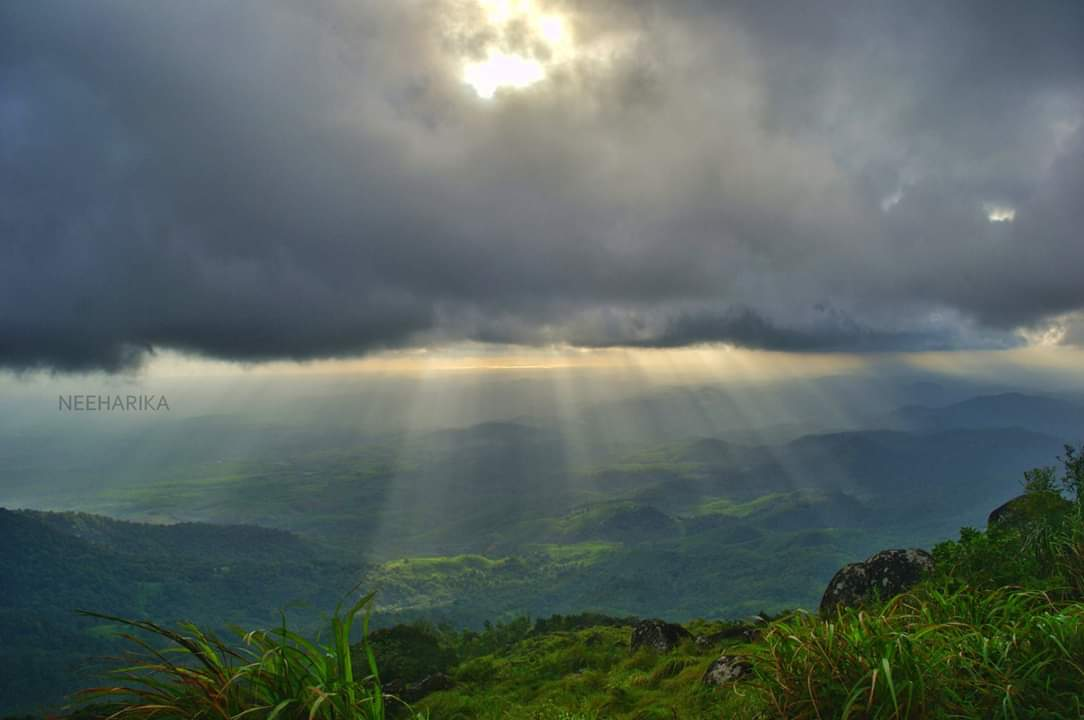
Rays @ Ponmudi

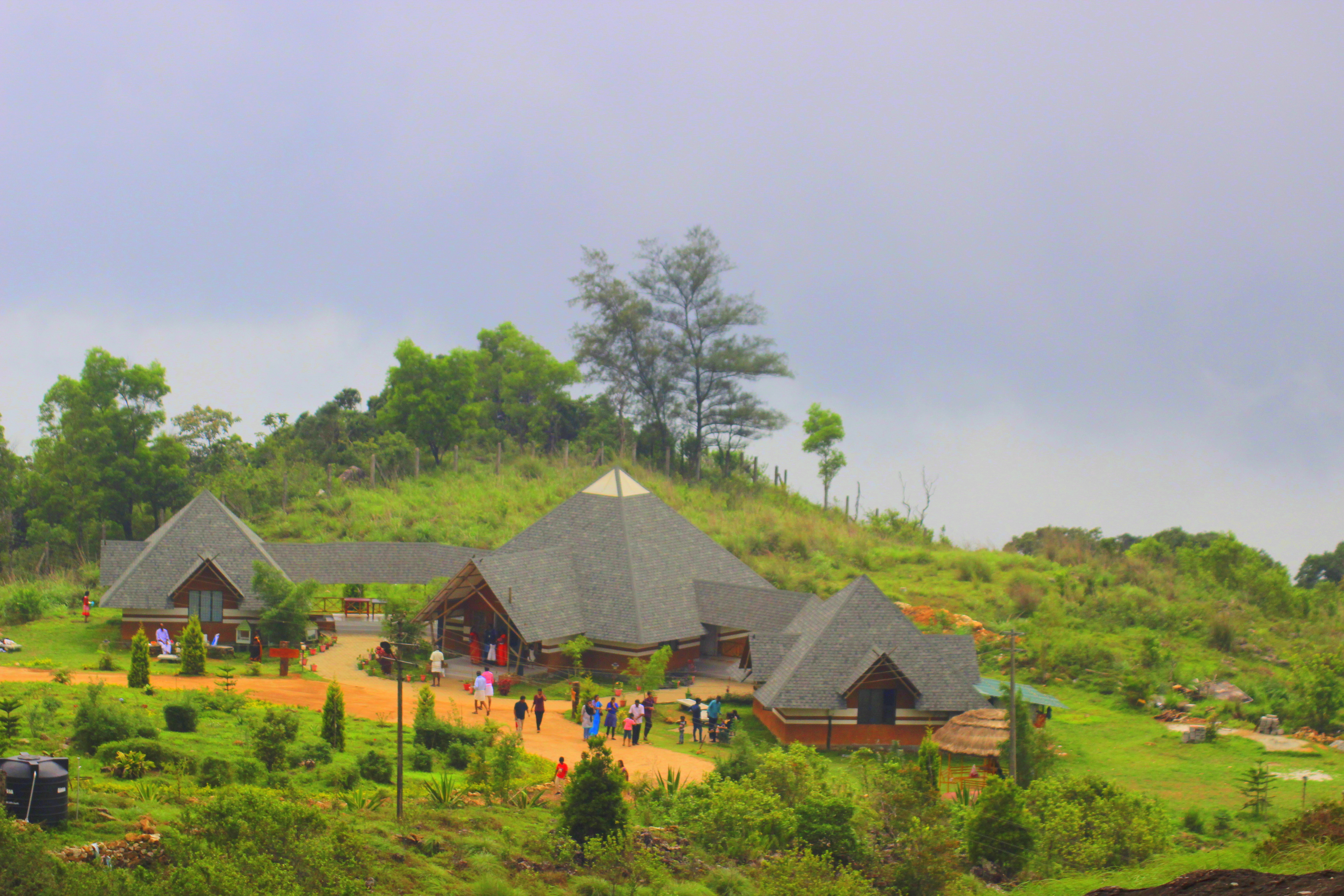
Interpretation Centre

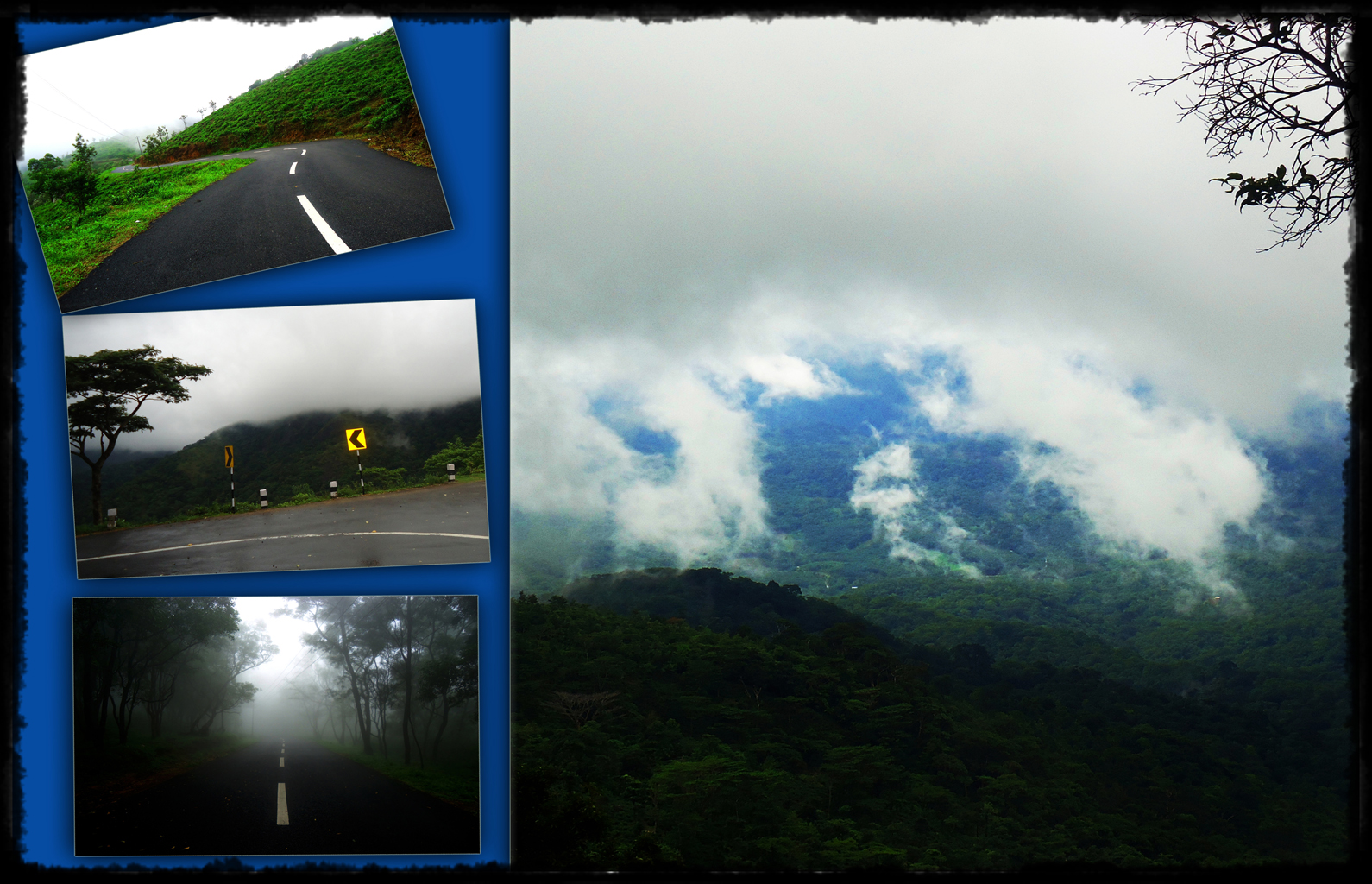
Ponmudi Hills and Road

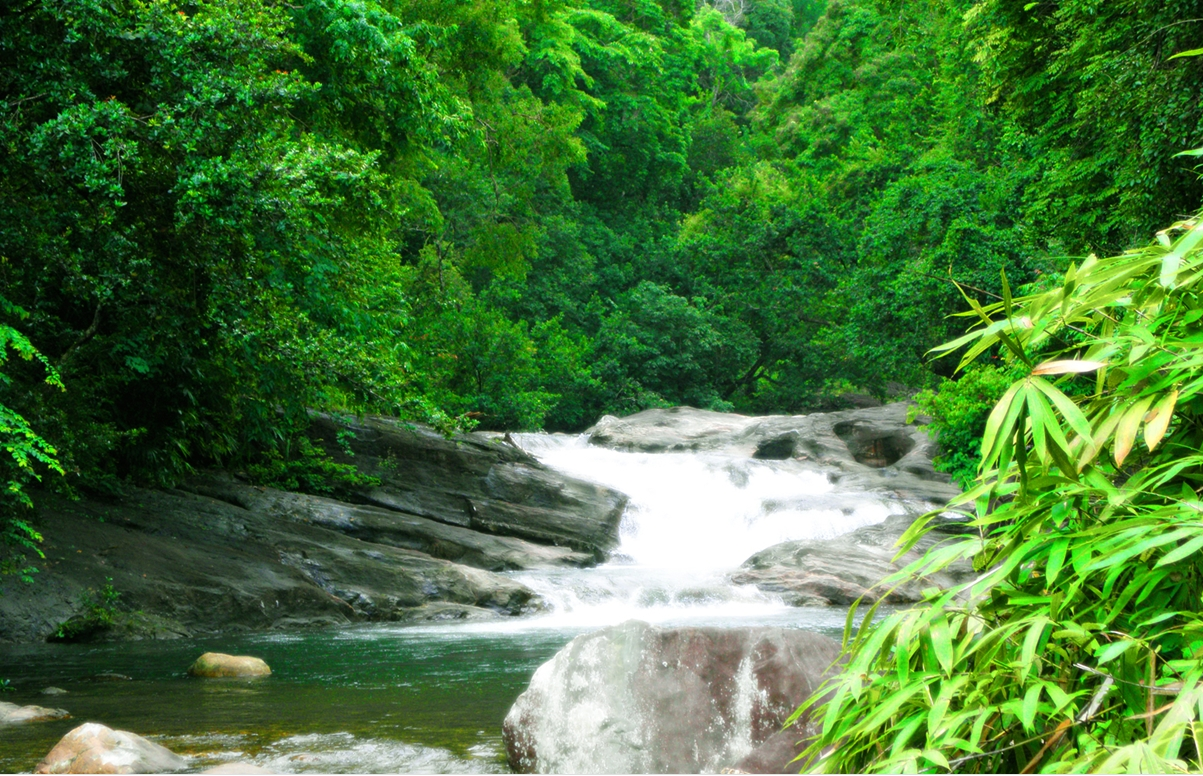
Kallar

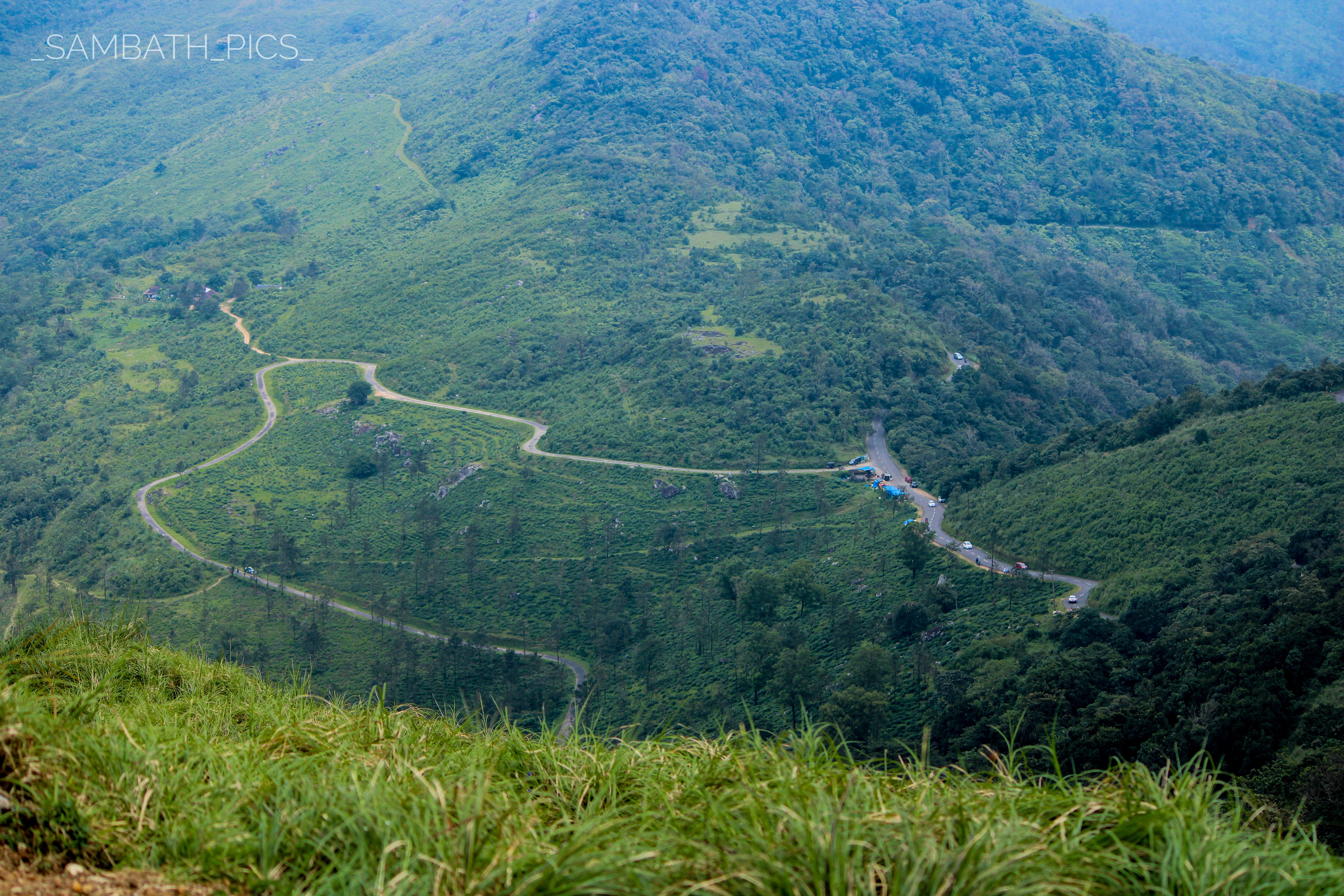
Ponmudi

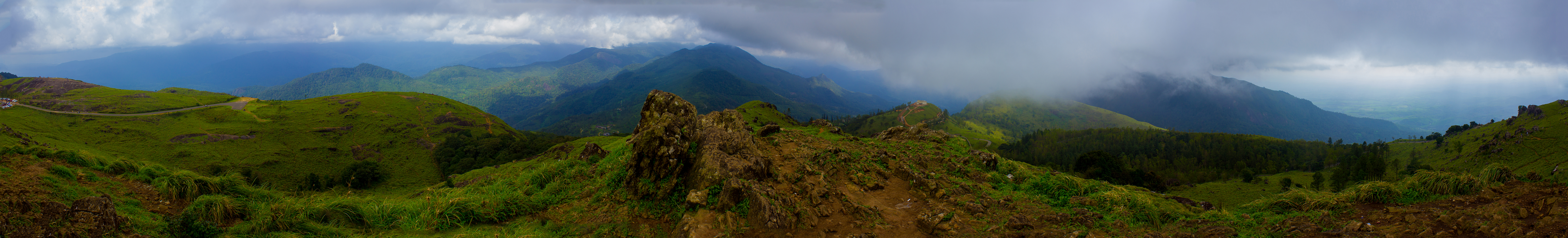
Ponmudi Panorama

== Transport ==
=== Road transport ===
- Ponmudi hill station is well connected to Thiruvananthapuram and Kerala by a wide network of roads. Taxis are available from the Central Station at Thiruvananthapuram and Airport.

=== Rail ===
- Nearest railway station is Thiruvananthapuram Central railway station.

=== Air ===
- Nearest airport is Thiruvananthapuram International Airport.

== Trivandrum Ponmudi Rope way ==
The Trivandrum Ponmudi Rope way Project is a proposed initiative aimed at enhancing tourism and improving connectivity in the Ponmudi hill station, located in the Western Ghats of Kerala. The project involves the construction of a ropeway system to provide easier access to the scenic hilltop, offering panoramic views of the surrounding landscape. It is expected to attract more visitors to the area, supporting the local economy and promoting sustainable tourism. The project is being developed with a focus on environmental considerations and safety standards

== Incidents ==
- On 15 July 1990, an Indian Air Force An-32 crashed in the Ponmudi Mountain Range while en route from Tambaram Air Force Station to Thiruvananthapuram in India.

== See also ==
- Anamudi - Highest peak in Kerala
- Agastya Mala - Highest peak in Kerala south of the Cardamom Hills
