= Kanjirappuzha (Mannarkkad) =

River in Kerala, India

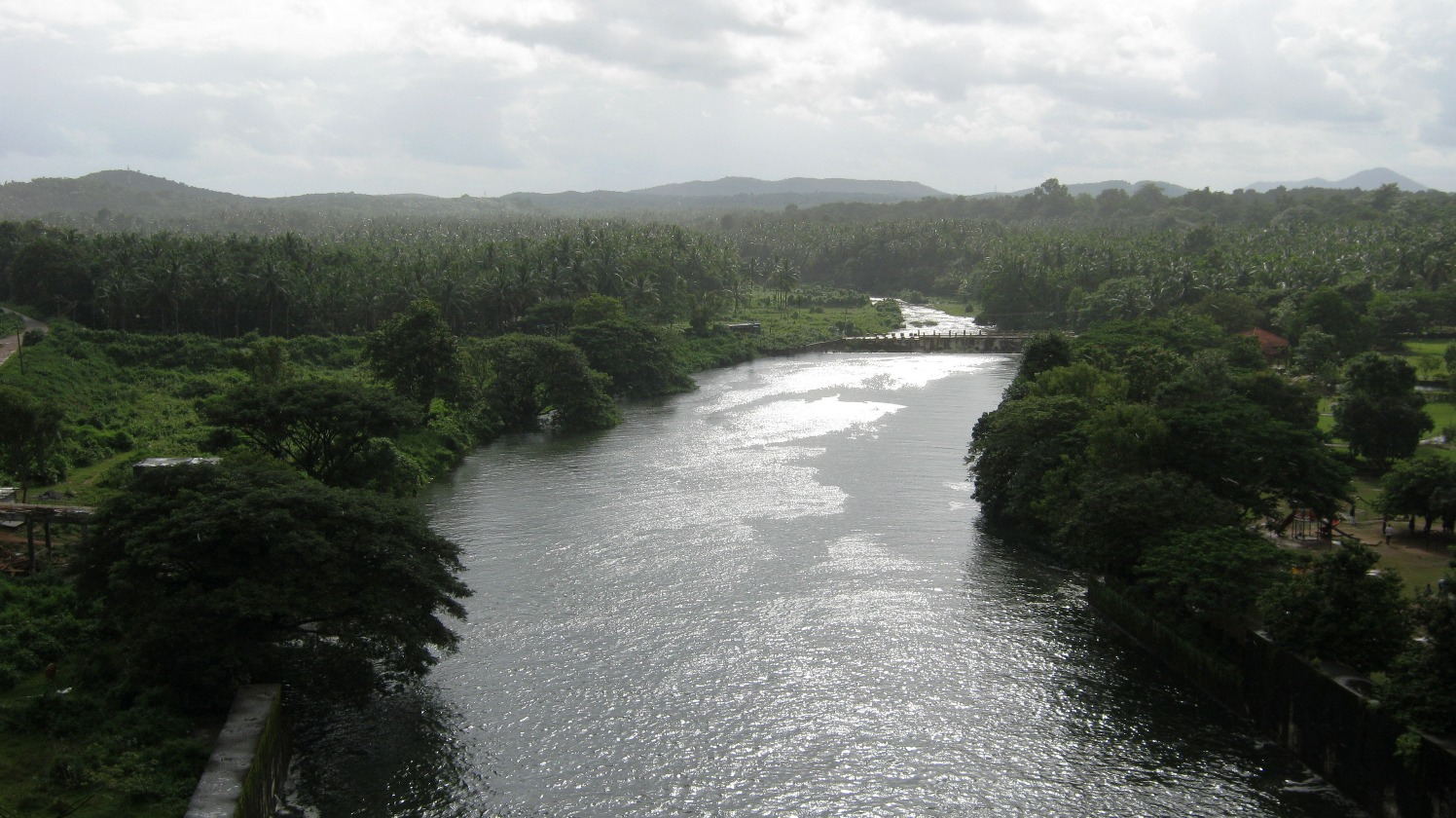
Kanjirapuzha river

Kanjirappuzha River is one of the tributaries of the river Thuthapuzha. The Thuthapuzha is one of the main tributaries of the Bharathapuzha River, the second-longest river in Kerala, India.

The Kerala government has started an irrigation project on the river in 1987 in the district of Palakkad. The Kanjirapuzha reservoir caters to the irrigation needs of the villages in the area. The Kanjirapuzha dam is also a tourist spot.

== See also ==
- Bharathapuzha - Main river
  - Thuthapuzha - One of the main tributaries of the river Bharathapuzha

== Other tributaries of the river Thuthapuzha ==
- Kunthipuzha
- Kanjirappuzha
- Ambankadavu
- Thuppanadippuzha
