= Kondazhy Thrithamthali Siva-Parvathy Temple =

Hindu temple in Thrissur district, Kerala, India

Kondazhy Tritham Tali Siva Temple
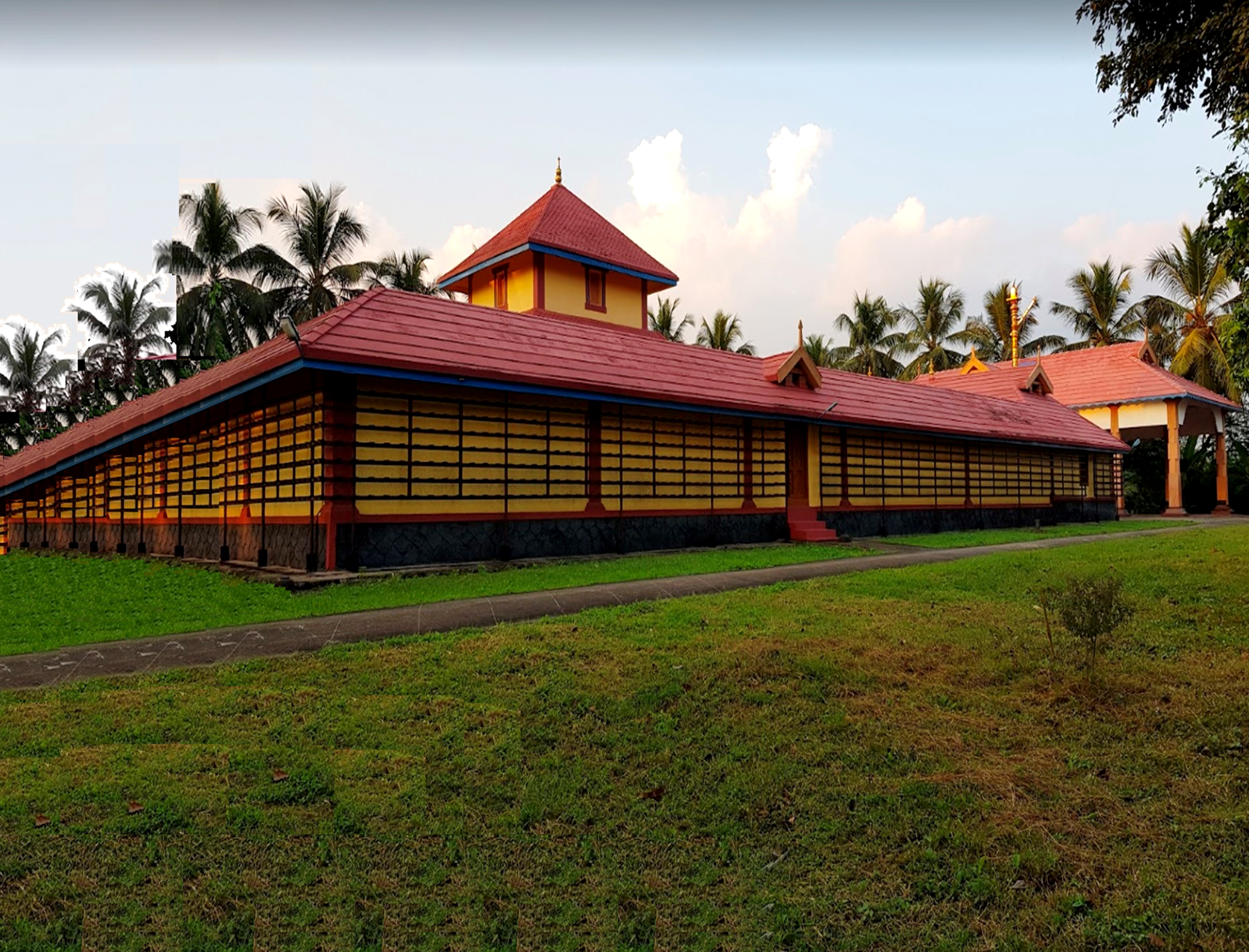
- Temple Nalambalam

- Tritham Tali Siva Temple, Kondazhy, Thrissur, Kerala

Religion
- Affiliation: Hinduism
- District: Thrissur
- Deity: Shiva; Parvathi
- Festival: Maha Shivaratri

Location
- Location: Kondazhy
- State: Kerala
- Country: India
- Interactive map of Kondazhy Tritham Tali Siva Temple
- Coordinates: 10.715257°N 76.404092°E

Architecture
- Type: Kerala style
- Completed: Not known

Specifications
- Temple: One
- Monument: 2
- Elevation: 68.45 m (225 ft)

Kondazhy Tritham Tali Siva Temple (Malayalam: കൊണ്ടാഴി തൃത്തംതളി ശിവ ക്ഷേത്രം; IAST: koṇṭāḻi tr̥ttaṁtaḷi śiva kṣētraṁ) a Hindu temple, dedicated to Shiva situated on the banks of Gayathripuzha, a tributary of Bharathappuzha, at Kondazhy of Thrissur District in Kerala state in India. The Kondazhy Temple is one of the important temples in Kingdom of Cochin. According to legends, sage Parashurama installed the idol of Lord Shiva at the south bank of river Nila. The temple is a part of the 108 famous Shiva temples in Kerala.

== History ==
During Chera rule, Kerala was divided into eighteen tiers for the administration; each tier headed by a major temple (Shiva temple). In these, the Tritam Tali Siva Temple is the central temple of the tree. There is a special temple dedicated to Goddess Parvathi in the premises, and also houses 11 sub-deities, including the three sons of Lord Shiva (Ganapathi, Subrahmanya and Ayyappan), Mahavishnu, Bhadrakali, Navagrahas, Hanuman, Serpent deities and Brahmarakshassu.

== Tipu's attack ==
This temple is said to have been destroyed during Tipu Sultan's conquest reign while his invasion of Kerala. After that, for nearly two hundred years, the sculpture of the Maha temple has been broken up.

== See also ==
- 108 Shiva Temples
- Temples of Kerala

== Gallery ==
Kondazhy Tritham Tali Siva Temple

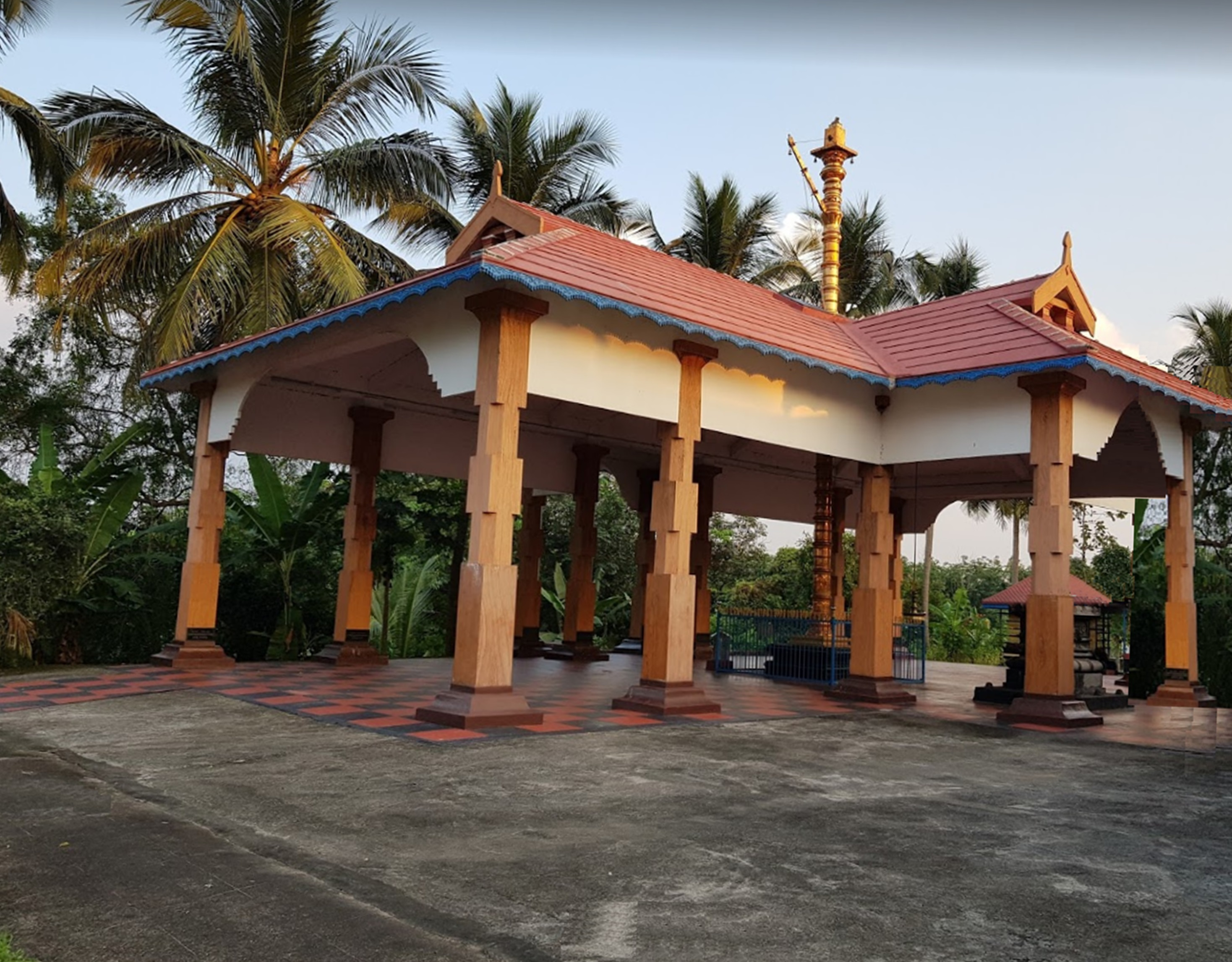
Anakottil

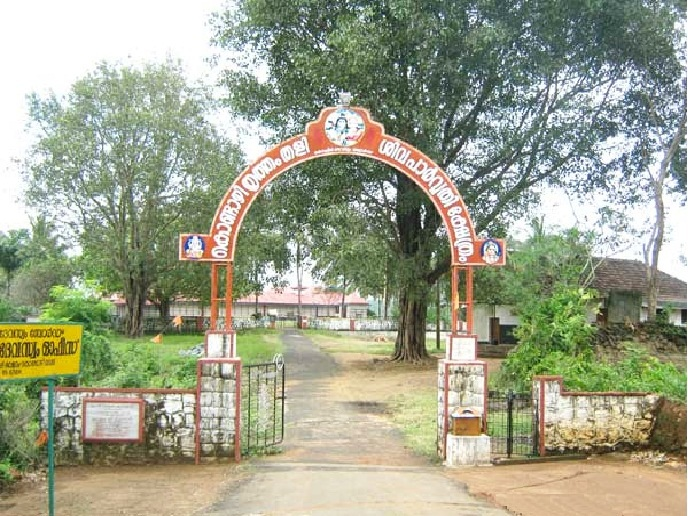
Temple Entrance

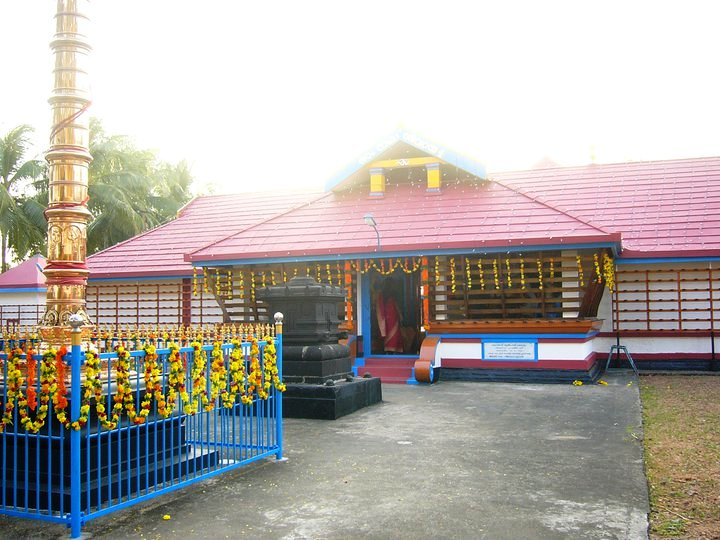
Shiva Temple Nalambalam

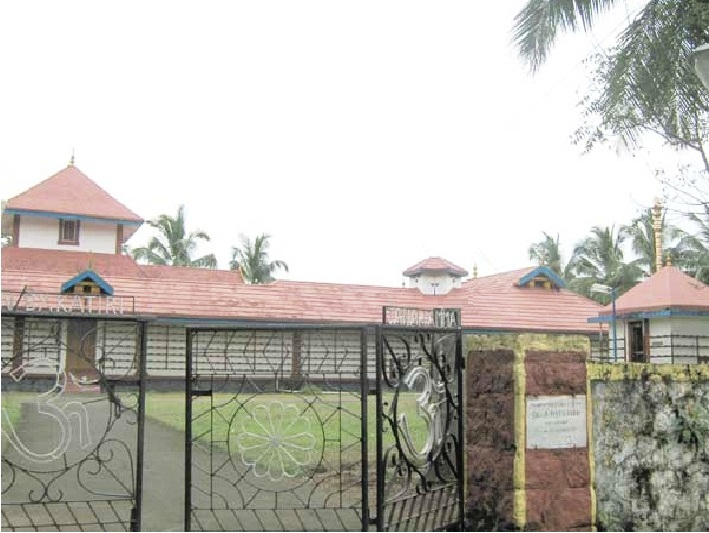
Nalambalam

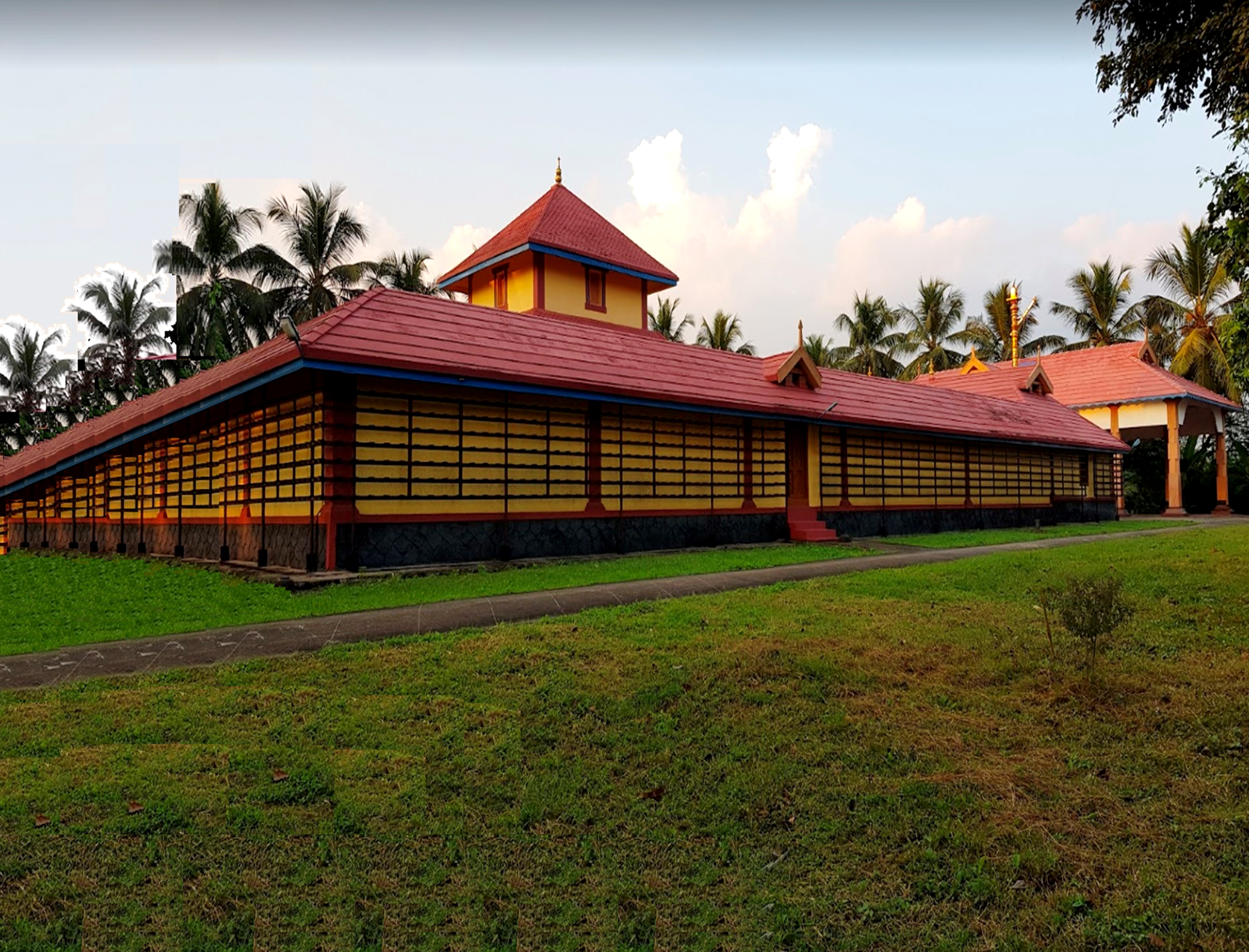
Temple
