= Mudappallur =

- village
- Interactive map of Mudappallur
- Coordinates: 10.5879746°N 76.5160847°E
- Country: India
- State: Kerala
- District: Palakkad

Government
  - Body: Vandazhy Panchayat.

Languages
  - Official: Malayalam, English
- Time zone: UTC+5:30 (IST)
- PIN: 678705
- Telephone code: 91 4922
- Vehicle registration: KL-9, KL-49
- Nearest city: Thrissur (33 km away); Palakkad (34 km away)
- Lok Sabha constituency: Alathur
- Lok Sabha constituency: Alathur

Mudappallur is a village in the Palakkad district of the state of Kerala in India. It is a small locality comes under the Vandazhi-II village, Alathur Taluk. Mudappallur's Postal Index Number is 678705.

== Location ==
Mudappallur is situated in State Highway 58 (SH 58) is a State Highway in Kerala, India that starts in Vadakkancherry and ends in Pollachi. Mudappallur is located 5 km away from Vadakkencherry and 10 km from Alathur. Mangalam Dam is 10 km nearer to this area which is a place of tourist interest. Nelliambathy, the tourist hill station, is 38 km from Mudappallur.

== Educational institutions ==
Government High School, NSS UP School and lions college of science are the three institute of this place.

== Temples ==
The two important temples of the village are Azhikulangara Bhagavathi temple and Lord Shiva temple. Sree cheerumba Baghavathy temple at Payyaroad, Sree Cheermba Kavu, Kunnu parambu, Sree Subramanyan temple, Panthaparambu, Sree Angala Parameswari Temple, Manalodi, Panthaparambu, Sree Mariyamman temple, Manalodi and Mathur are other temples at Mudappallur.

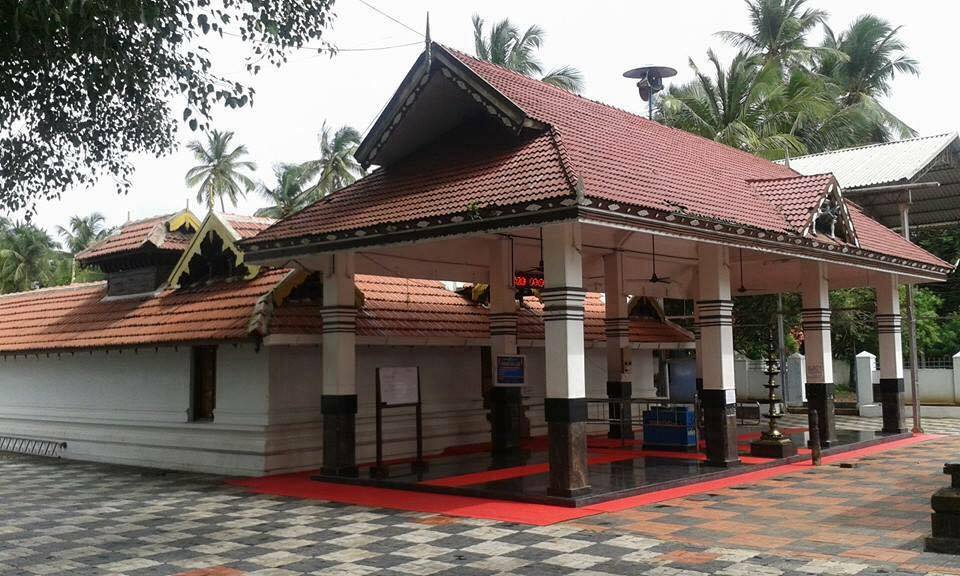
azhikulangara bhagavathi temple

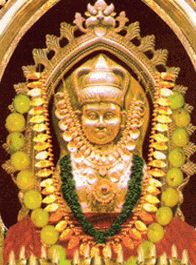
Azhikulangara

=== Festival ===
- Mudappallur Vela:

Mudappallur vela or Azhikulangara Bhagavathi vela celebrated on 22 May of each year. Fireworks, Panchavadhyam, Chenda melam are the main attractions of the festival. Sree Sastha from Lord Shiva temple visiting Bagavathy is the myth of the festival

== Mosques ==
Mudappallur has two mosques, Salafi Masjid operated by Kerala Nadvathul Mujahideen and a Sunnathu Jam'ath Masjid operated by Samastha Kerala Jamiyyathul Ulama.

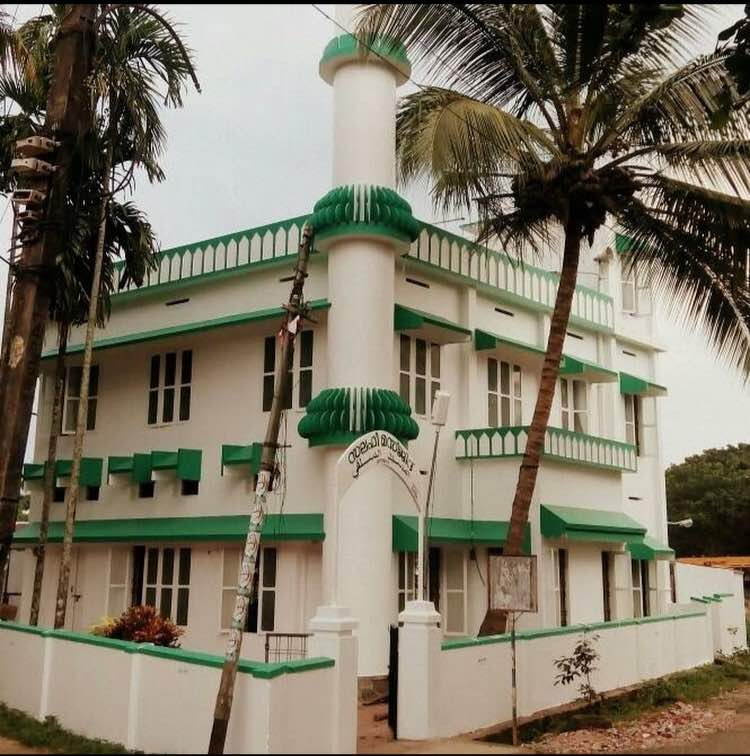
Salafi Masjid, as of March 2016
