= Vandazhi =

Vandazhi or Vandazhy may refer to

- Vandazhi-I, a village in Palakkad district, Kerala, India
- Vandazhi-II, a village in Palakkad district, Kerala, India
- Vandazhy (gram panchayat), a gram panchayat for the above villages
