= Kannadipuzha River =

Kannadipuzha River is one of the main tributaries of the Bharathapuzha River, the second-longest river in Kerala, south India. It flows through Palakkad district in Kerala playing a crucial role for agriculture in the region.

== Origin and course ==
The Kannadipuzha, also called as Shokanashini, originates in the foothills of the Anamalai hills in the eastern fringes of Palakkad district of Kerala. It flows through Palakkad city before joining the Bharathapuzha. The Kannadipuzha along with the Kalpathipuzha and Gayatripuzha irrigate a major portion of the Palakkad district which is also called the 'rice bowl' of Kerala. At Parli, it merges with Kalpathipuzha and flows as Bharathapuzha. The upstream area is relatively dry as it falls in the rainshadow of the Western Ghats. Tributaries of Kannadipuzha are Palar, Aliyar and Uppar Aliyar.

=== Temples ===
Along the banks of the rivers are Brahmin villages called Agraharams, where Tamil-speaking Brahmins, who had migrated from various Agraharams in Tamil Nadu reside. There are many temples in the villages along the river, like Puthugramam which has a temple that does not have an idol. It was believed that the idol was removed during Tipu Sultan's attack of Palakkad. The village was established at about 1700 AD by a group of Kandaramanikkam Brahacharanam Brahmins who migrated from Aangarai Agraharam near Lalgudi and Anbil (famous for \Aanbil Brahmarayar Prime Minister of Rajaraja Chola of Chola Dynasty) in Trichi. Initially the village was near the present Manappulli Bhagavathi temple, which at that time was not having any set pooja rituals.

== Other tributaries of Kannadipuzha ==
- Aliyar
- Uppar
- Palar
