= Vandazhippuzha River =

River in India

Vandazhippuzha River is one of the tributaries of the river Gayathripuzha. It gets its name since it flows through the village of Vandazhi in Palakkad district. It has its origin in Nelliyampathy hills and joins Gayathri river near Alathur. Gayathripuzha is one of the main tributaries of the Bharathapuzha River, the second-longest river in Kerala, south India.

In October 2013, it was reported that many prehistoric posthole sites of pillared halls were found in the valley of the Gayathripuzha. These socket remains (cupules/postholes) found on several rock outcrops at the foothills of Thenmala of the Western Ghats in the Palakkad Gap zone suggest that the sites may be Neolithic settlements..

== See also ==
- Bharathapuzha - Main river
  - Gayathripuzha - One of the main tributaries of the river Bharathapuzha

=== Other tributaries of the river Gayathripuzha ===
- Mangalam river
- Ayalurpuzha
- Vandazhippuzha
- Meenkarappuzha
- Chulliyar
