= Ayalurpuzha River =

Ayalurpuzha River is one of the tributaries of the river Gayathripuzha. The Gayathripuzha itself later becomes one of the main tributaries of the Bharathapuzha River, the second-longest river in Kerala, South India.

== Other tributaries of the river Gayathripuzha ==
- Mangalam river
- Vandazhippuzha
- Meenkarappuzha
- Chulliyar
