= Kondazhy =

- village
- Interactive map of Kondazhy
- Coordinates: 10.726994°N 76.3953799°E
- Country: India
- State: Kerala
- District: Thrissur

Area
  - Total: 29.89 km^{2} (11.54 sq mi)

Population (2011)
  - Total: 11,507
  - Density: 385.0/km^{2} (997.1/sq mi)

Languages
  - Official: Malayalam
- Time zone: UTC+5:30 (IST)
- PIN: 679106
- Telephone code: 0488428
- Vehicle registration: KL-48(SRTO Wadakkanchery)
- Nearest city: Ottapalam
- Lok Sabha constituency: Alathur
- Vidhan Sabha constituency: Chelakkara

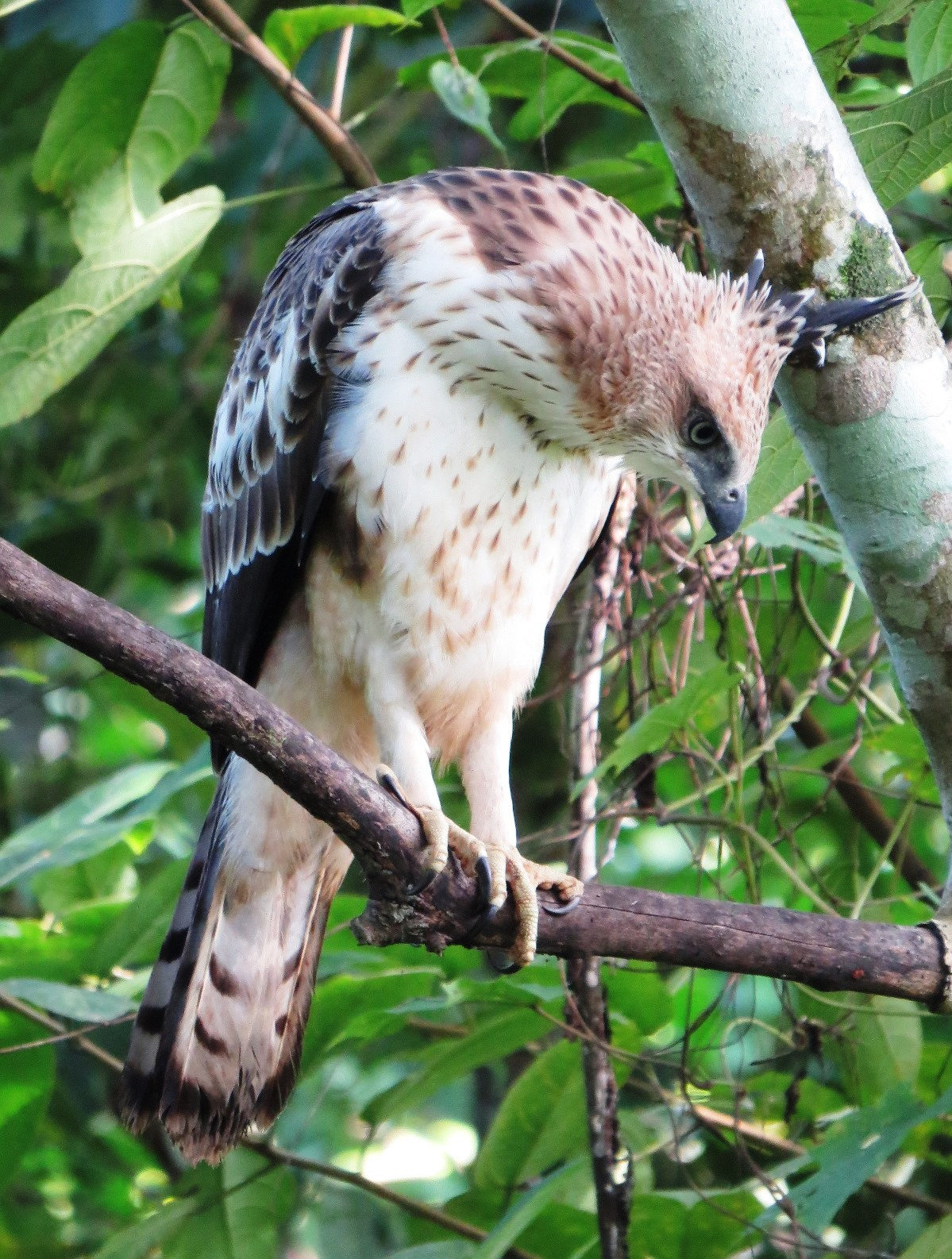
Hawk Eagle found at Mayannur

Kondazhy is a Grama Panchayat & village in Thrissur district in the state of Kerala, India.

== Demographics ==
As of 2011 India census, Kondazhy had a population of 11507 with 5556 males and 5951 females. Kondazhi is a Panchayath (it includes Mayannur, Kondazhy and Chelakode Villages), situated South side of Ottapalam.

== Economy ==
Economy mainly depends on agriculture and inward remittances from mainly gulf region.

== Demographics ==
Majority of population is Hindus mainly Scheduled Castes, Nair, Thandan, Ezhuthachan, Chettiyar and other castes. Fewer Christians & Muslims are also seen.

Chirankara, Paramelpadi, Kondazhy, South Kondazhy & Chelakkode are the main areas of Kondazhy Grama Panchayat. Various government offices & establishments such as the Grama Panchayat Office, S.V.U.P. School, Kondazhy-Mayannur Group Village Office, Agricultural Office, Post Office, Govt. Primary Health Center, Ayurveda Dispensary, Kondazhy Service Co-Operative Bank, Milk Producers Co-operative Society, Telephone Exchange, Askhaya Center, Pharmacies, Ration Shops etc. are situated in Paramelpadi. Saraswathi Vilasam UP school also situated in paramelpadi. It is the oldest educational institution of Kondazhy. It was established in 1919. The Thrissur district's one & only Kendhreeya Navodaya Vidhyalaya is in Kondazhy Panchayat and this school is situated at Mayannur, near the Chirankara town. Devi Vilasam Lower Primary School is situated in South Kondazhy.The other main school is St. Thomas Higher Secondary School. This school is situated at Koottilmukku, a naturally scenic & beautiful landmark where two rivers; the Bharathapuzha and the Gayathri Puzha are uniting. Other importance of Koottilmukku is it shares borders with the Ottapalam Municipality on the north and the Thiruvillwamala Grama Panchayat on the East. Thali Temple is one of the historic temples situated in South Kondazhi. Mayannur Kaavu, Konnakkal Vishnu Temple, Kiratha Parvathi temple, Mariamman Kovils are other major temples in Kondazhy. St. Mary's Church is also situated at Kondazhi, Mayannur. Most of the younger generation is away, and now the village is mostly an abode of elders.
