= Mangalam River =

River in Kerala, India

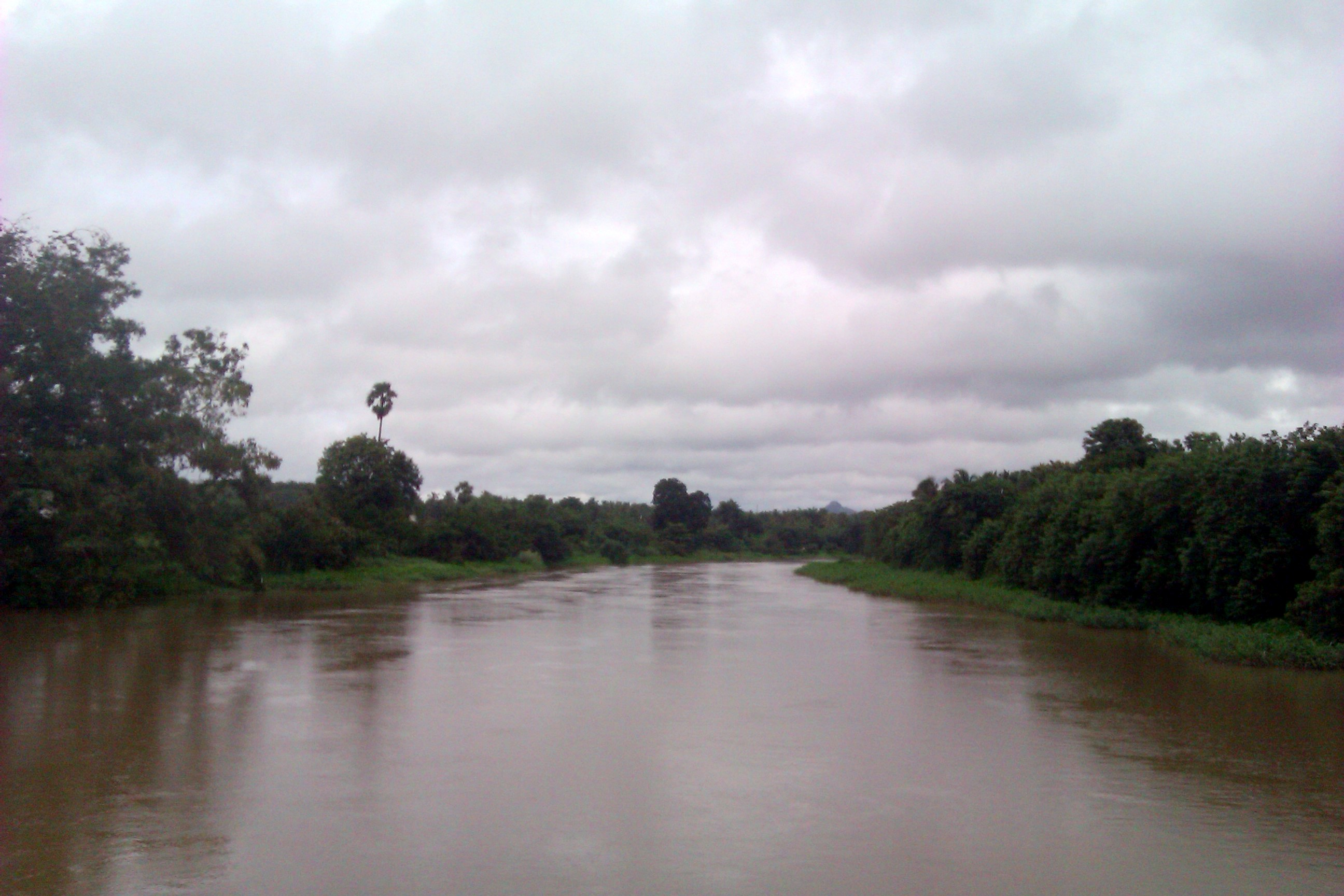

- Location within Kerala Location within India

Physical characteristics
- Mouth
  - coordinates: 10.675519°N 76.4490613°E

The Mangalam River is the main tributary of the river Gayathripuzha, which in turn is a tributary of Bharathapuzha, the second longest river in Kerala, India.

It is around 30 kilometres (19 mi) long, with its source in the Nelliyampathy forests, and passing through Vadakkencherry, Kannambra, Puthucode, and Padur before joining the Gayathripuzha at Plazhi in the border of Thrissur and Palakkad districts.

Constructed across the Cherukunnapuzha river, a tributary of the Mangalam river, the Mangalam Dam holds a substantial water capacity of 25.34 million cubic feet. A canal system for irrigation was completed and opened in 1966, in Alathur taluk, Palakkad district.

During the Sabarimala season the quality of water has been deteriorating, according to a study.

== Mangalam project ==
The Mangalam project is a dam across Cherukunnam river, a tributary of Mangalam river with a net work of canal system to irrigate 3440 ha. of land in Alathur taluk of Palakkad district. The project commissioned in 1957.

== Tributaries of the Mangalam river ==
- Cherukunnapuzha

== See also ==
- Bharathapuzha - Main river
  - Gayathripuzha - One of the main tributaries of the river Bharathapuzha

=== Other tributaries of the river Gayathripuzha ===
- Ayalurpuzha
- Vandazhippuzha
- Meenkarappuzha
- Chulliyar
