= Manappadam =

Manappadam Manappadom
- village
- Location within Kerala Location within India
- Coordinates: 10°37′45″N 76°28′0″E
- Country: India
- State: Kerala
- District: Palakkad

Languages
  - Official: Malayalam, English
- Time zone: UTC+5:30 (IST)
- PIN: 678687
- Telephone code: 0492
- Vehicle registration: KL-49
- Nearest city: Vadakkenchery
- Lok Sabha constituency: Alathur
- Climate: 22 DC to 45 DC. (Köppen)

Manappadam is a village in the Palakkad district of Kerala state, south India. It is in Puthucode Panchayath. Vadakkencherry is the nearest town. Pin code is 678689. The village has a temple dedicated to goddess Karthiyayani, called the Karthiyayani Bhagawathy temple.
