= Cherukunnapuzha =

River in Kerala, India

Cherukunnapuzha is a tributary of the Mangalam river, a tributary of Bharathapuzha, in Palakkad district, Kerala, India. The Mangalam Dam is constructed across the river.
