= Chulliyar River =

River in Kerala, India

Chulliyar River is one of the tributaries of the river Gayathripuzha. The Gayathripuzha in turn is one of the main tributaries of the Bharathapuzha River, the second-longest river in Kerala, south India.

View of Chulliar Dam with the western ghats as background . This is the southern part of the Palakkad Gap

== Other tributaries of the river Gayathripuzha ==
- Mangalam river
- Ayalurpuzha
- Vandazhippuzha
- Meenkarappuzha
- Chulliyar
