= Aliyar River =

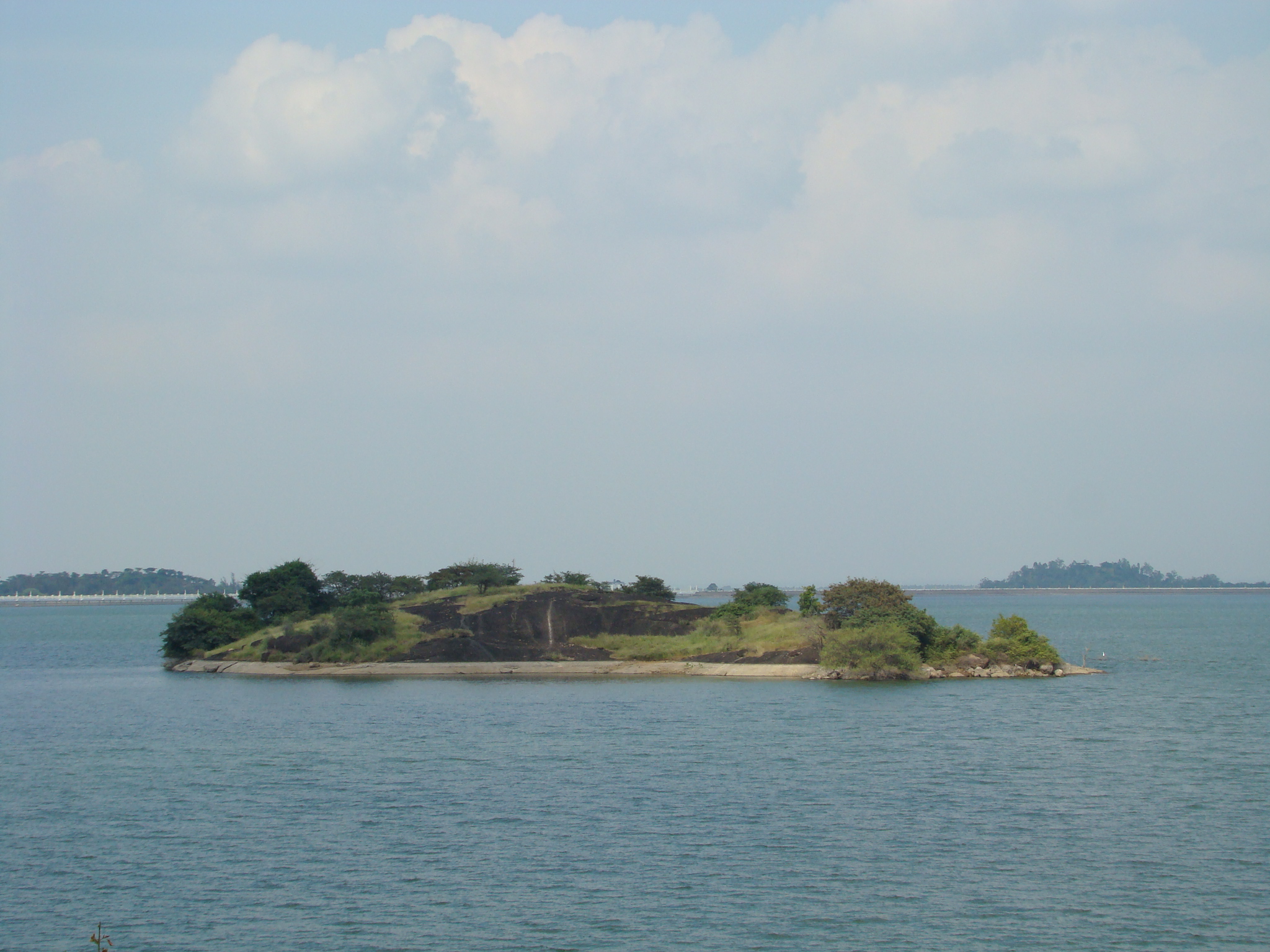
- Aliyar Dam Reservoir

- Location of mouth

Physical characteristics
- Source
  - coordinates: 10.3617543°N 77.0920165°E
- Mouth
  - coordinates: 10°37′N 76°57′E

Basin features
- Waterbodies: Aliyar Reservoir, Upper Aliyar Reservoir

Aliyar is one of the tributaries of the river Kannadipuzha. Kannadipuzha is one of the main tributaries of the river Bharathapuzha, the second-longest river in Kerala, south India. Its source is the Aliyar reserve forest in Aliyar near Pollachi in Tamil Nadu. From 1959 - 1969, a dam was built on it, which facilitated the flow of water from Aliyar Reservoir.

== See also ==
- Bharathapuzha - Main river
  - Kannadipuzha - One of the main tributaries of the river Bharathapuzha
- Other tributaries of the river Kannadipuzha:
  - Palar
  - Aliyar
  - Uppar
