= Mayannur Kavu Sri Kurumba Bagavathy Temple =

Sri Kurumba Bagavathi Temple (Mayannur Kavu)
- Sri Kurumba Bhagavathy Temple, Mayannur, Thrissur, Kerala

Religion
- Affiliation: Hinduism
- District: Thrissur
- Deity: Sri Kurumba Bagavathy

Location
- Location: Mayannur
- State: Kerala
- Country: India
- Interactive map of Sri Kurumba Bagavathi Temple (Mayannur Kavu)
- Coordinates: 10.754209°N 76.349445°E

Architecture
- Type: South Indian

Specifications
- Temple: One
- Elevation: 67.83 m (223 ft)

The Mayannur Kavu Sri Kurumba Bagavathy Temple is a Hindu temple located in Mayannur of Thrissur District of Kerala.

The temple is dedicated to Goddess Sri Kurumba Bhagavathi.
