= Puducode =

Puthucode Puthucode, Puthukkode, Puducode
- village
- Puthucode
- Pddy field in the village
- Interactive map of Puthucode
- Coordinates: 10°39′35″N 76°14′58″E
- Country: India
- State: Kerala
- District: Palakkad

Government
  - Type: Panchayat
  - Body: Puthucode Grama Panchayath

Population (2011)
  - Total: 21,773

Languages
  - Official: Malayalam, English, Tamil
- Time zone: UTC+5:30 (IST)
- PIN: 678-687
- Telephone code: 04922
- Vehicle registration: KL-9 or KL-49
- Lok Sabha: Alathur
- Legislative: Tarur
- Civic agency: Puthucode Grama Panchayath
- Website: www.puthucode.com

River in Puducode village

Puthucode (also spelled Puducode and Puthukkode) is a village and gram panchayat in Palakkad district in the state of Kerala, India. It is situated in Alathur taluk, around 12 km from Alathur and 4 km from Vadakkancherry, on the western bank of Mangalam River, a sub-tributary of Bharathapuzha.

== Demographics ==
As of 2011 India census, Puducode had a population of 21,773 with 10,582 males and 11,151 females.

== Culture ==
The Sri Annapoorneswari temple is a Bhagavathy place of worship located at the junction of four streets: South, East, North, and West of Puducode agraharam. Each street is referred to as a village. The temple is believed to be one of the 108 Durga temples established by Parasurama.

At the end of North Village, there is a Shiva temple and a water tank. Legend goes that the temple was so rich earlier that all the vessels and articles used in the temple were made of gold. There has also been a tradition of the chanting of Shyamala Dandakam every evening at this temple.

Next to the Shiva temple, a mandapam called Shiva Mahal has been built. Shiva Mahal includes an elementary school, a high school, a Bharatiya Vidya Bhavan branch centre, and an Ayurvedic Hospital. Despite a historically large Brahmin population, Puthucode is also home to a newly built mosque at Karapotta.

Historically the largest Muslim community Rowthers population is also in Puthucode. Maralad Theru, Cheenikka theru, Panangad theru, Palli theru, Thekku theru, Meley theru, Puthu theru are the better known among them. They use Malayalam and Tamil as their common language.

The main festival celebrated in Puthucode is the Navarathri Festival which spans 10 days and 9 nights. During the celebration all houses in the village are decorated with Bomma Kolu and each village is given a special day to perform their celebrations inside the Bhagavathi Temple. On the specific day, the organizers from the village arrange for elephants, Panchavadyam, Melam etc. and take the Bhagavathi's idol on the elephant to their village. All the 10 days, lunch is served to devotees at the temple free of cost. On average nearly 2000 people have lunch everyday.

== Education ==
Sarvajan High School is based in the village. It was built around 70 years ago in front of the West Nada (Door/Entrance) of the Sri Annapoorneswari temple and is itself fronted by another temple. Initially it was started only for girls education as the years passed by, the school expanded and started preparing pupils from the Nursery class up to X Standard.

== Notable people ==
Among Puducode's well-known residents have been P. R. Sundaram Iyer, whose grandson is P. C. Sreeram, a cinematographer in Indian cinema. Sundaram Iyer founded the Sanskrit College in the village.
