= Vandazhi-I =

- village
- Location in Kerala, India Vandazhi-I (India)
- Coordinates: 10.572872°N 76.518188°E
- Country: India
- State: Kerala
- District: Palakkad

Population (2011)
  - Total: 13,128

Languages
  - Official: Malayalam, English
- Time zone: UTC+5:30 (IST)
- PIN: 678706
- Vehicle registration: KL-

Vandazhi-I is a village in Palakkad district in the state of Kerala, India. It is administered by Vandazhy gram panchayat, along with Mangalam Dam and Vandazhi-II.

== Demographics ==
As of 2011 India census, Vandazhi-I had a population of 13,128 with 6,501 males and 6,627 females.
