= Vandazhy Gram Panchayat =

Gram panchayat in Kerala, India

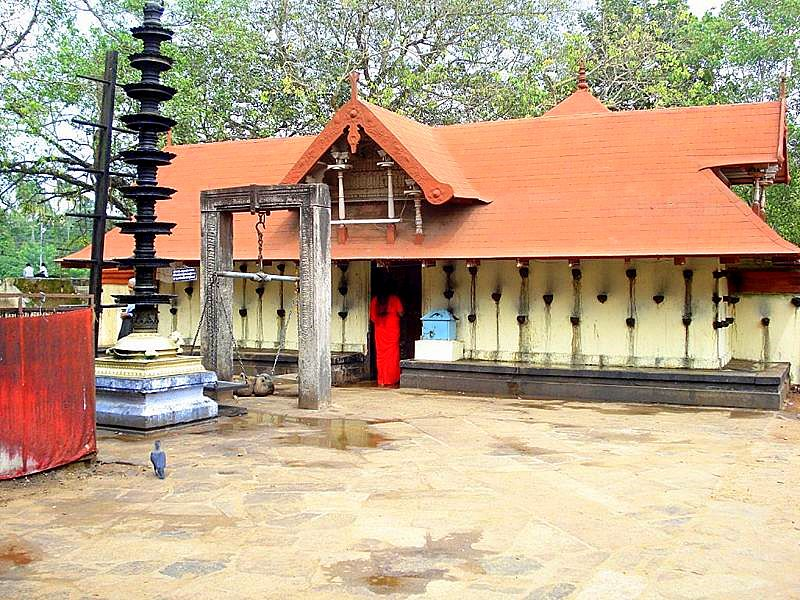
Bhagavathy Temple, Mudappallur

Vandazhy is a gram panchayat in the Palakkad district, state of Kerala, India. It is a local government organisation that serves the villages of Vandazhi-I, Vandazhi-II and Mangalam Dam.
