= Gayathripuzha River =

Tributary of the Bharathapuzha River, Kerala, India

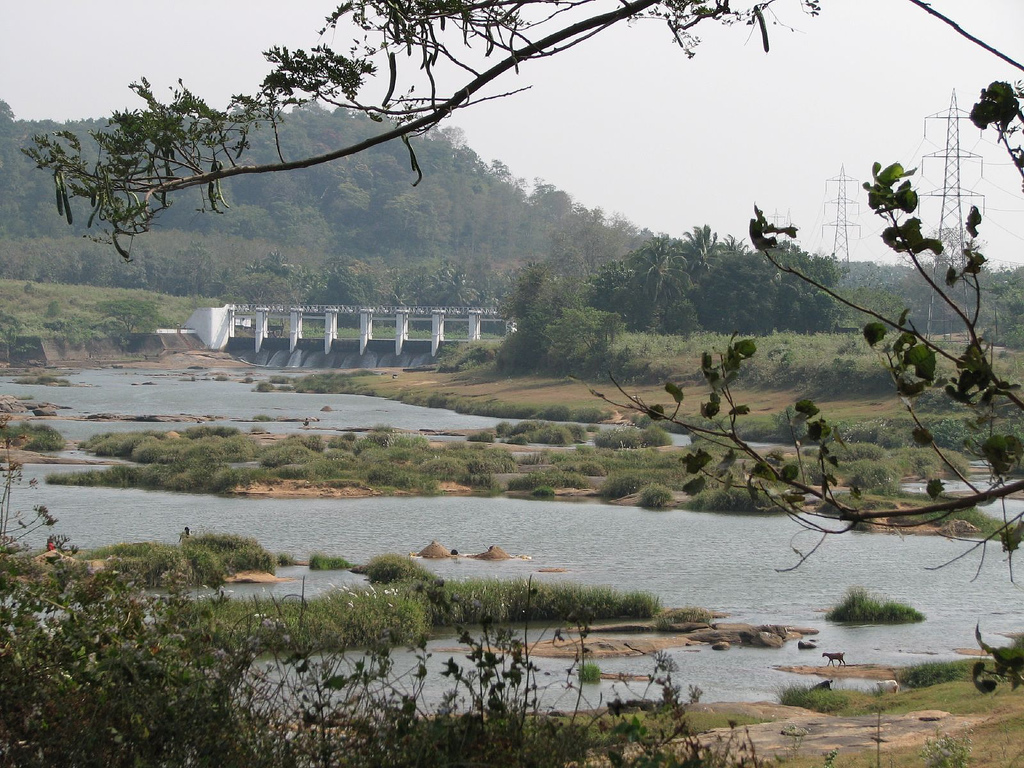
- View from Pazhayannur

- Location within Kerala Location within India

Physical characteristics
- Mouth
  - coordinates: 10.6756147°N 76.4520215°E

Gayathripuzha River is one of the main tributaries of the Bharathapuzha River, the second-longest river in Kerala, South India. It originates from Nelliyampathi hills, passes through Kollengode, Nenmara (Nemmara), Alathur, Padur and Pazhayannur before joining the Bharathapuzha at Mayannur. It is the second largest tributary of the Bharathapuzha, by both length and discharge. The Gayathripuzha flows mainly through Palakkad district, except for the last few kilometres. The river is non-perennial like its parent river, and is also prone of sand mining. There is a dam built across this river at Cherakkuzhy near Pazhayannur.

== Tributaries of Gayathripuzha ==
- Mangalam river - Largest and longest tributary. Joins Gayathripuzha in Plazhy at the border of Palakkad and Thrissur districts.
- Ayalurpuzha
- Vandazhippuzha
- Meenkarappuzha
- Chulliyar
