= Chelakode =

Chelakkode
- village
- Location in Kerala, India Chelakkode (India)
- Coordinates: 10.681980°N 76.3483200°E
- Country: India
- State: Kerala
- District: Thrissur
- Talukas: Talappilly

Languages
  - Official: Malayalam, English
- Time zone: UTC+5:30 (IST)
- PIN: 680587
- Telephone code: 04884
- Vehicle registration: KL- 48
- Nearest city: Chelakkara, Pazhayannur, Ottappalam, Wadakkanchery, Trichur
- Lok Sabha constituency: Alathur
- Vidhan Sabha constituency: Chelakkara

Chelakode is a village in Thrissur district (Thalappilly Taluk) (Kondazhy Panchayath) in the state of Kerala, India.
