= Vandazhi-II =

- village
- Location in Kerala, India Vandazhi-II (India)
- Coordinates: 10.572872°N 76.518188°E
- Country: India
- State: Kerala
- District: Palakkad

Population (2011)
  - Total: 12,789

Languages
  - Official: Malayalam, English
- Time zone: UTC+5:30 (IST)
- PIN: 6XXXXX
- Vehicle registration: KL-

Vandazhi-II is a village in the Palakkad district, state of Kerala, India. It is administered by Vandazhy gram panchayat, along with Mangalam Dam and Vandazhi-I.

== Demographics ==
As of 2011 India census, Vandazhi-II had a population of 12,789 with 6,278 males and 6,511 females.
