= Bharathappuzha =

River in India

Bharathapuzha
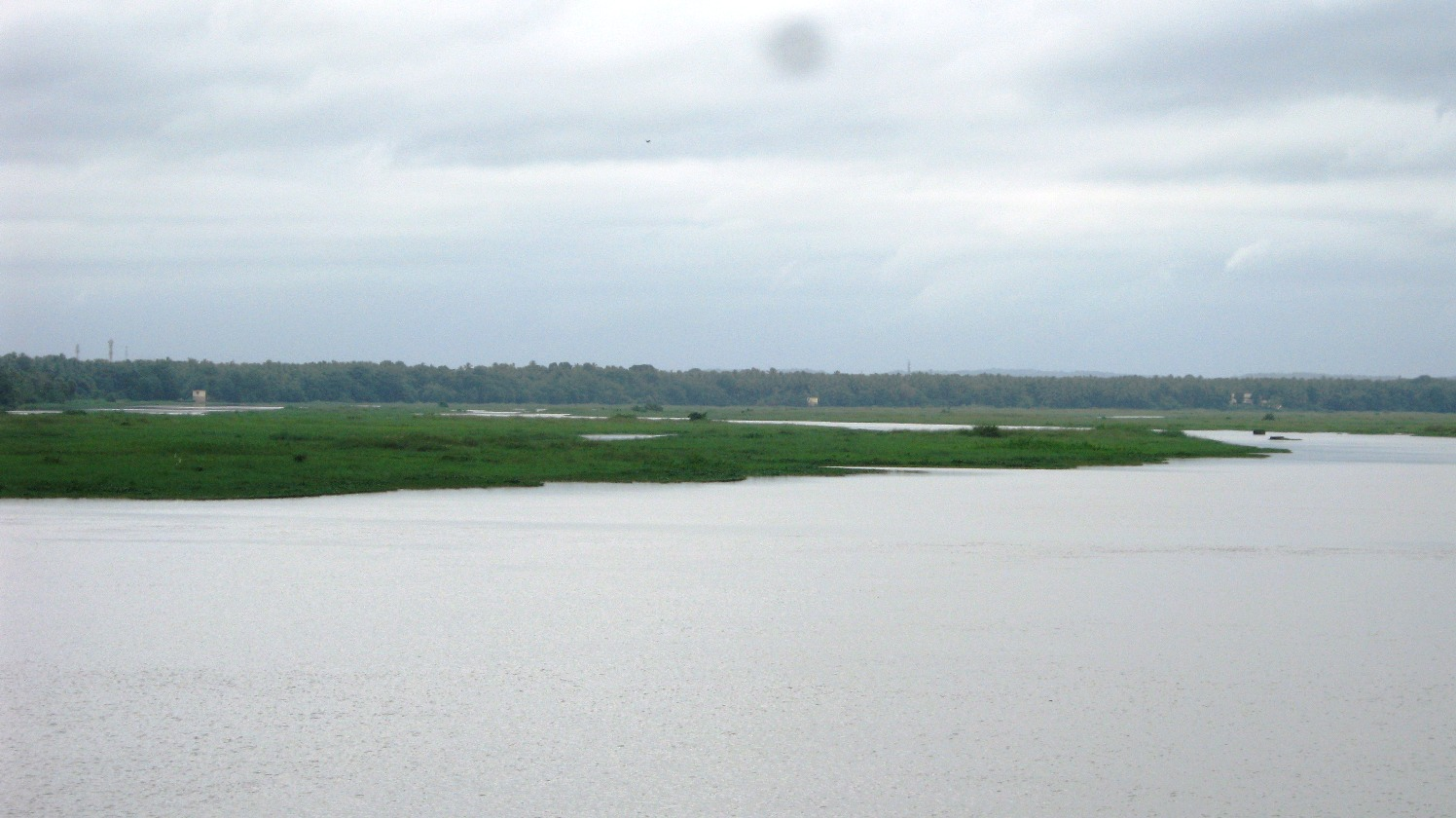
- Bharathappuzha at Triprangode near Thavanur, Malappuram, India

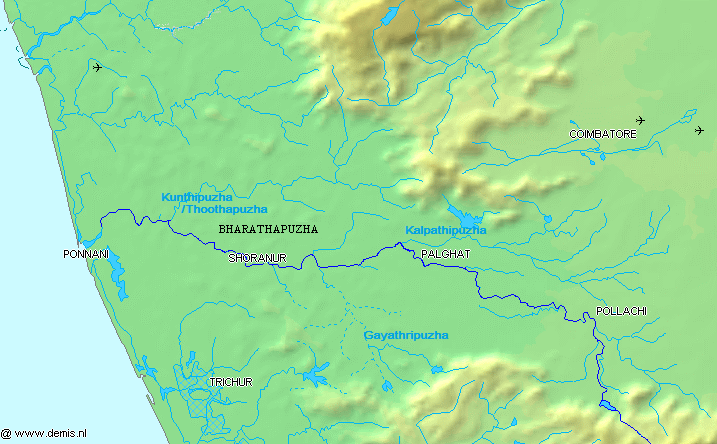
- Labelled map of Bharathappuzha

Location
- Country: India
- State: Kerala

Physical characteristics
- Source: Anamalai Hills
  - location: Tamil Nadu, India
  - coordinates: 10°21′00″N 77°04′24″E
  - elevation: 2,461 m (8,074 ft)
- Mouth: Lakshadweep Sea
  - location: Ponnani, Kerala
  - coordinates: 10°47′12″N 75°54′39″E
  - elevation: 0 m (0 ft)
- Length: 209 km (130 mi)
- Basin size: 6,186 km^{2} (2,388 sq mi)
- Discharge
  - location: mouth
  - average: 161 m^{3}/s (5,700 cu ft/s)

Basin features
- Tributaries
  - left: Thuthapuzha, Gayathripuzha, Kalpathipuzha, Kannadipuzha, Tirur River
- Basin High Point: Thanakku Malai (2513m)

The Bharathappuzha ("River of Bhārata"), also known as the Nila River, Ponnani River (since it empties into Arabian Sea at Ponnani), or Kuttippuram River, is a river in the Indian state of Kerala. With a length of 209 km, it is the second longest river that flows through Kerala after the Periyar. It flows through the Palakkad Gap, which is also the largest opening in the Kerala portion of the Western Ghats. The Nila has groomed the culture and life of South Malabar part of Kerala. It is also referred to as the "Peraar" in ancient scripts and documents. River Bharathapuzha is an interstate river and lifeline water source for a population residing in four administrative districts, namely Malappuram and Palakkad districts, and parts of Palakkad-Thrissur district border of Kerala and Coimbatore, and Tiruppur of Tamil Nadu. The fertile Thrissur-Ponnani Kole Wetlands lie on its bank.

== Etymology ==
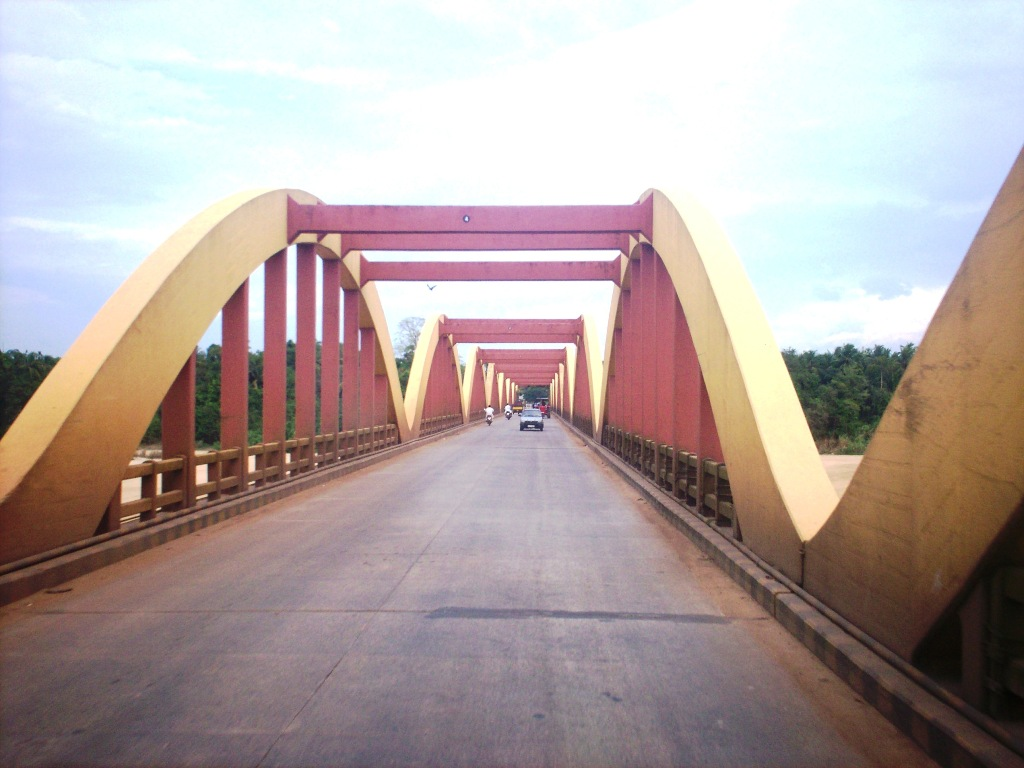
Kuttippuram bridge

The river originates in Tamil Nadu, Thirumoorthy Dam. Once it enters Kerala, it gets significance and has five names - Bharathappuzha, Ponnani River, Nila, Perar, and Kuttippuram River, of which the first name is more popular. The river meets the Lakshadweep Sea at an azhi (estuary), the southern part of which is known as Ponnani and northern part as Padinjarekkara. Thus the river gets the name Ponnani River. After the construction of the famous Kuttippuram bridge over Bharathappuzha to connect Kozhikode with Kochi, the name Kuttippuram River also became familiar.

== Course ==
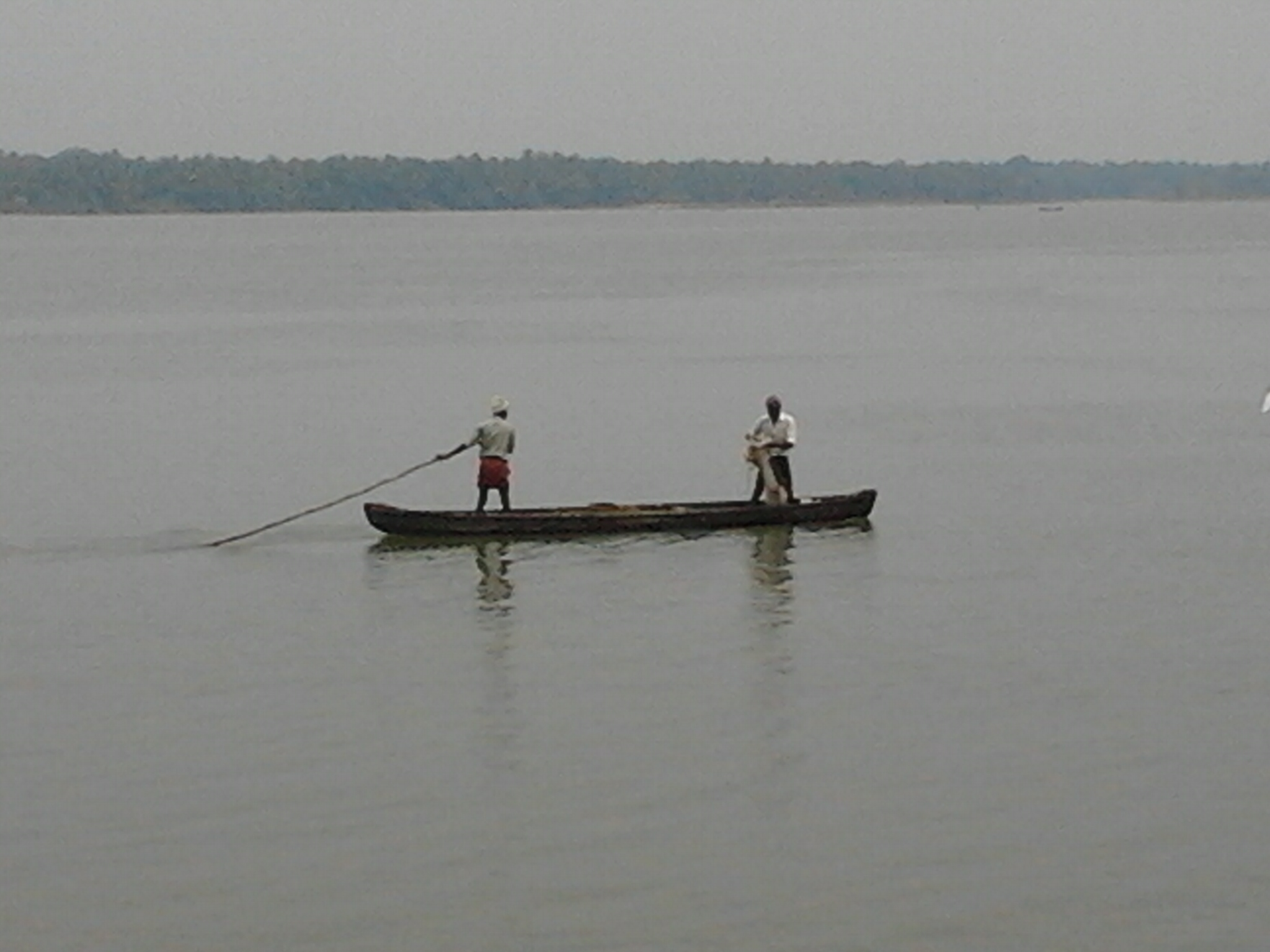
Local fishermen in Bharathapuhza

The headwaters of the main tributary of Bharathapuzha originates from various parts of the Western Ghats near the Anamailai hill ranges in Tamil Nadu as small rivulets, and flows westward through Palakkad Gap, (also known as Palghat gap) across Palakkad and Malappuram districts of Kerala, with many tributaries joining it, including the Tirur River. For the first 40 km or so, the Bharathappuzha follows an almost northerly course till Pollachi near Coimbatore. At Parli, the Kannadipuzha and Kalpathipuzha River merge and flow as Bharathappuzha, following a westerly course until it empties into the Lakshadweep Sea at Ponnani. At Mayannur, Gayathripuzha merges with the river. The Thuthapuzha merges with the Nila at Pallippuram. As the Thootha River is rich in water, after its merger, the Nila becomes thicker inflow.

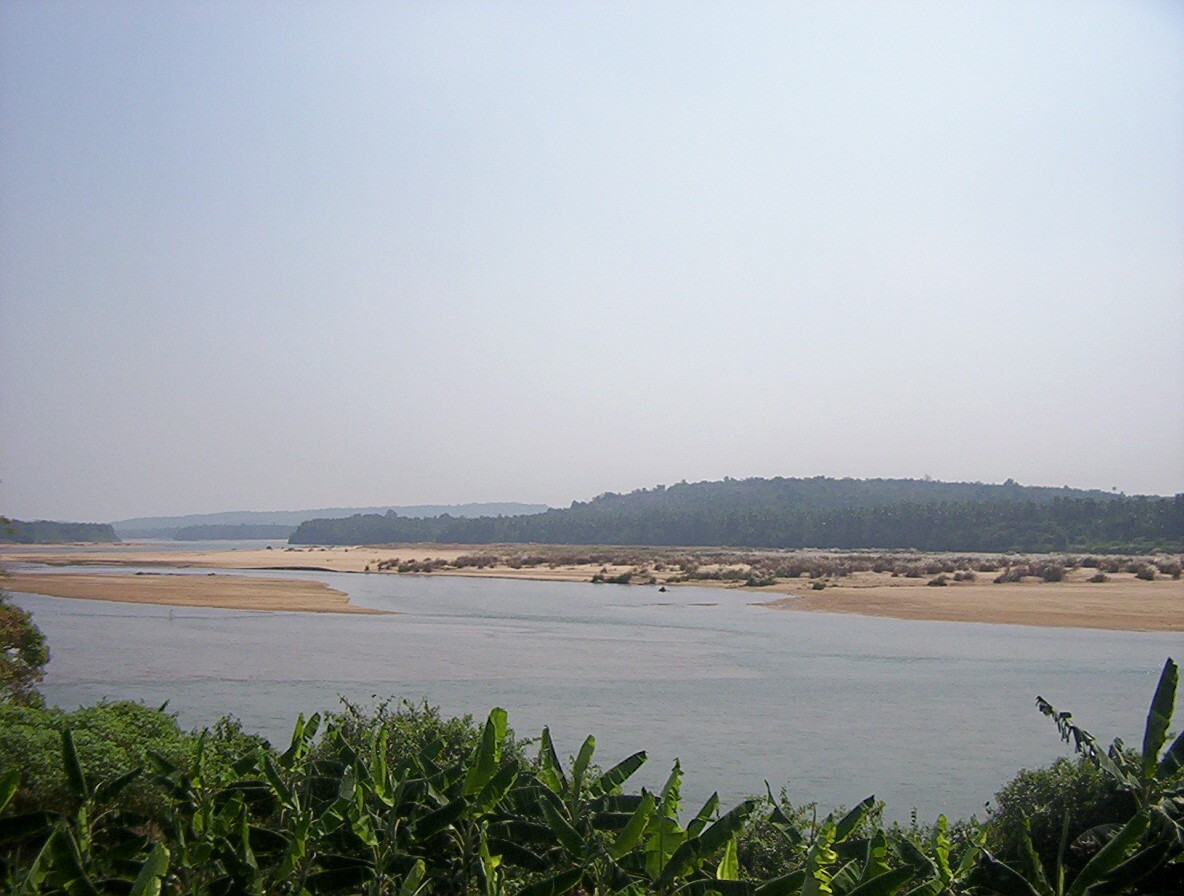
View of the river at Tirunavaya

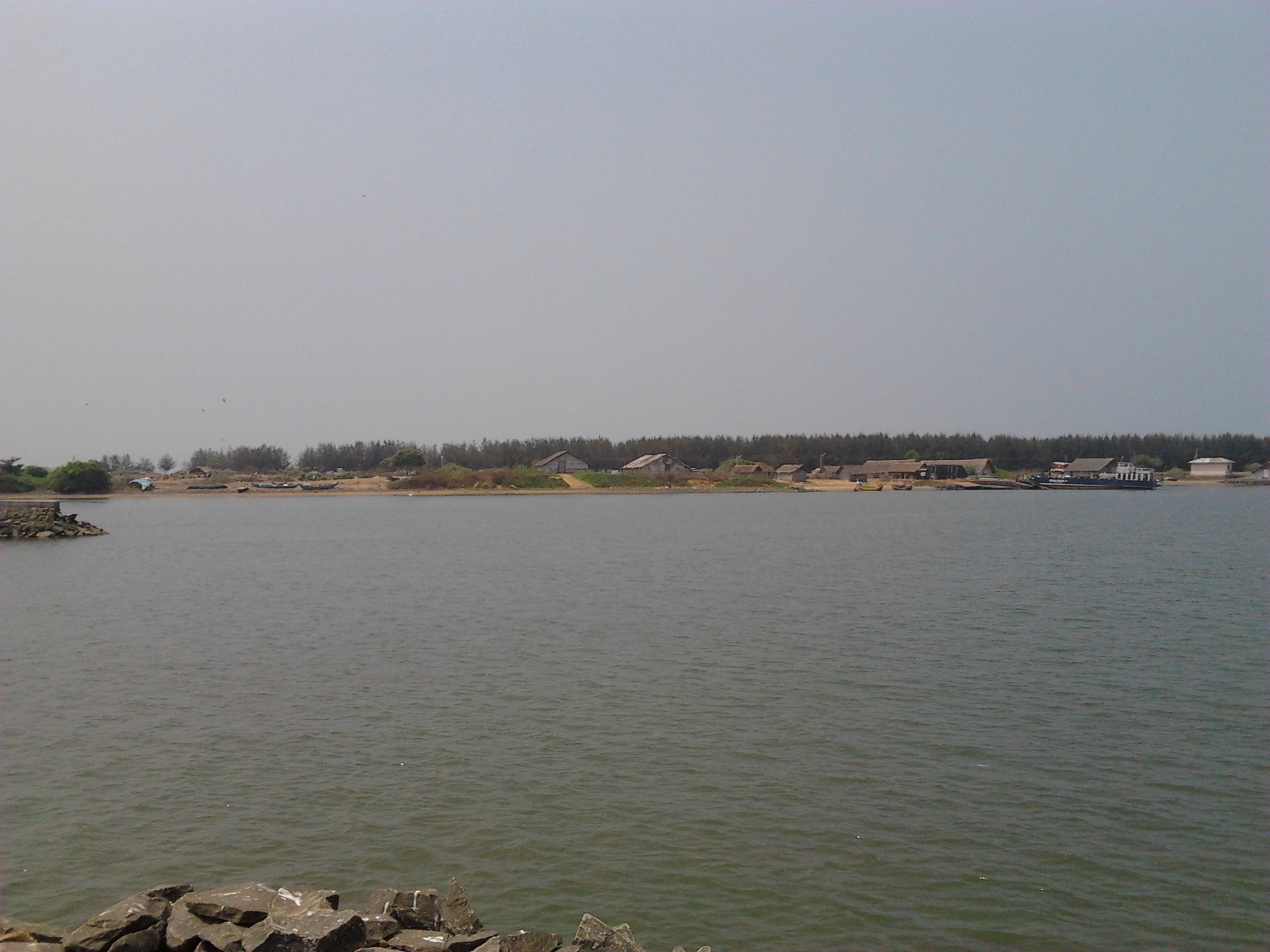
Tirur River joins Bharathapuzha in Ponnani

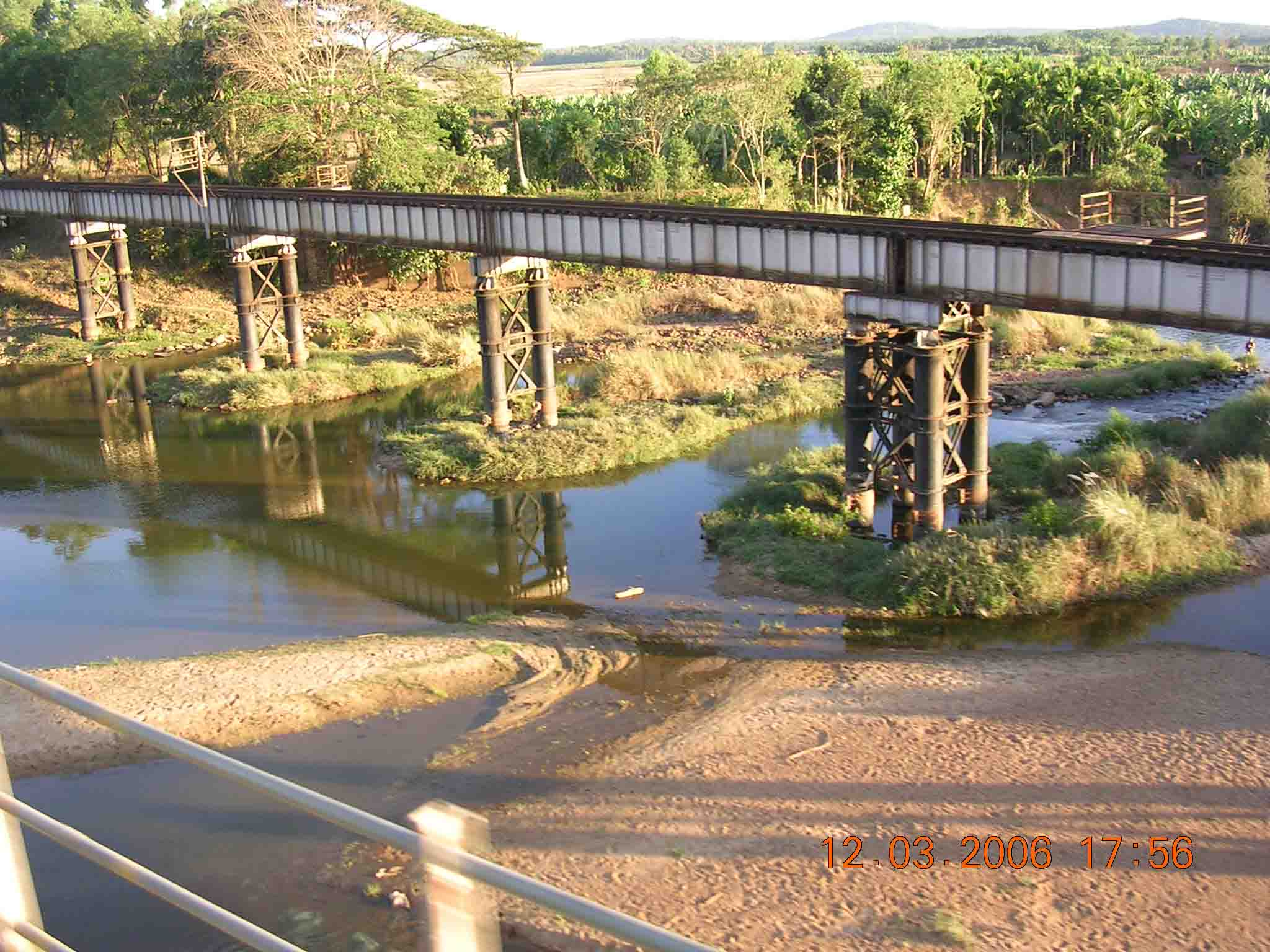
The Old Railway Bridge over Thutha River near its union with Bharathapuzha, built by the British in 1867 which goes into disuse with the construction of new bridges

The river is not navigable along most of its course except the small stretch where it joins the sea. With a watershed of 6,186 km^{2}, the Bharathapuzha basin is the largest among all the river basins in Kerala. A little more than two-thirds of this area (4400 km^{2}) is within Kerala and the remaining area (1786 km^{2}) is in Tamil Nadu. Though Bharathapuzha has a large basin, the water flow is relatively less compared to other long rivers in Kerala because a large portion of the basin is located in the comparatively drier regions (Tamil Nadu and Palakkad Gap). The construction of a number of dams after independence has also reduced the river flow. In fact, in the summer months, there is almost no flow in most parts of the river. The Bharathapuzha is the lifeline of many cities and villages: Chittur-Thathamangalam (in Chittur, Bharathappuzha is known as "Sokanasini"; this name was given by Thunjathu Ramanujan Ezhuthachan), Kodumbu-Thiruvalathur, Palakkad, Parli-Kottayi, Mankara-Perigottukurissi, Lakkidi-Thiruvilwamala, Killikkurussimangalam, Ottappalam, Shoranur, Cheruthuruthy, Chelakkara, Pattambi, Thrithala, Thiruvegappura, Kudallur, Pallipuram and Kumbidi. The village of Parudur, including the town of Pallipuram, stands near the confluence of this river and the River Thootha or, simply, Thuthapuzha. Then it goes through Kuttipuram, Tirunavaya, Irimbiliyam, Thavanur, Triprangode, and Ponnani. Thuthapuzha passes through Malappuram-Palakkad district border through Thootha, Elamkulam, and Pulamanthole. Tirur River goes through Athavanad, Tirur, Mangalam, Purathur, Triprangode, and Vettom.

== Irrigation projects ==
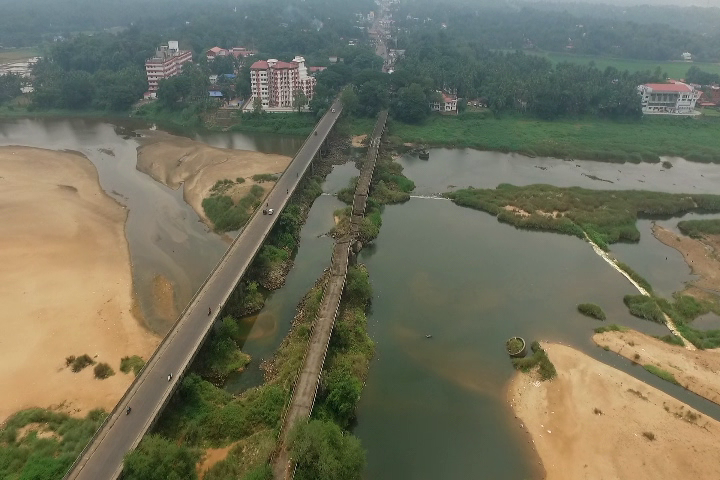
A view of the railway bridge over Bharathappuzha at Shoranur

The Bharathappuzha is extensively dammed. There are 11 reservoirs along the course of the river, and two more are under construction. Malampuzha dam is the largest among the reservoirs built across Bharathapuzha and its tributaries. Other dams in the Bharathapuzha basin are Walayar Dam, Mangalam Dam, Pothundi Dam, Meenkara Dam, Chulliyar Dam, Thirumoorthy, Aliyar, Upper Aliyar, Chitturpuzha regulator and Kanjirapuzha Dam. Most of these reservoirs serve the purpose of irrigation only. A total area of 773 km^{2} is irrigated by these irrigation projects. One irrigation dam at Chittur in Attappadi Hills is under construction. The construction of these two dams will increase the area irrigated by another 542 km^{2}. Another major project is the Regulator cum bridge at Thrithala built on the Velliyankallu bridge. The bridge connects the two villages Pallippuram and Thrithala. The main objective of the regulator is the drinking water supply. The water supply projects towards Thrissur district has already started. The shutter height of the regulator is 5 meters, and it can contain a huge quantity of water. Also, the new bridge reduces the distance from Thrissur to Kozhikode by 11 km. This project is the largest in Bharathappuzha in the last many decades. Fish species once thought to be almost extinct have come back remarkably due to the increased water level during summer. Special note is to be made on the species called 'Vaala' considered to be the king of fresh water fishes. Individual 'Vaala' weighing 5 to 10 kg are now common.

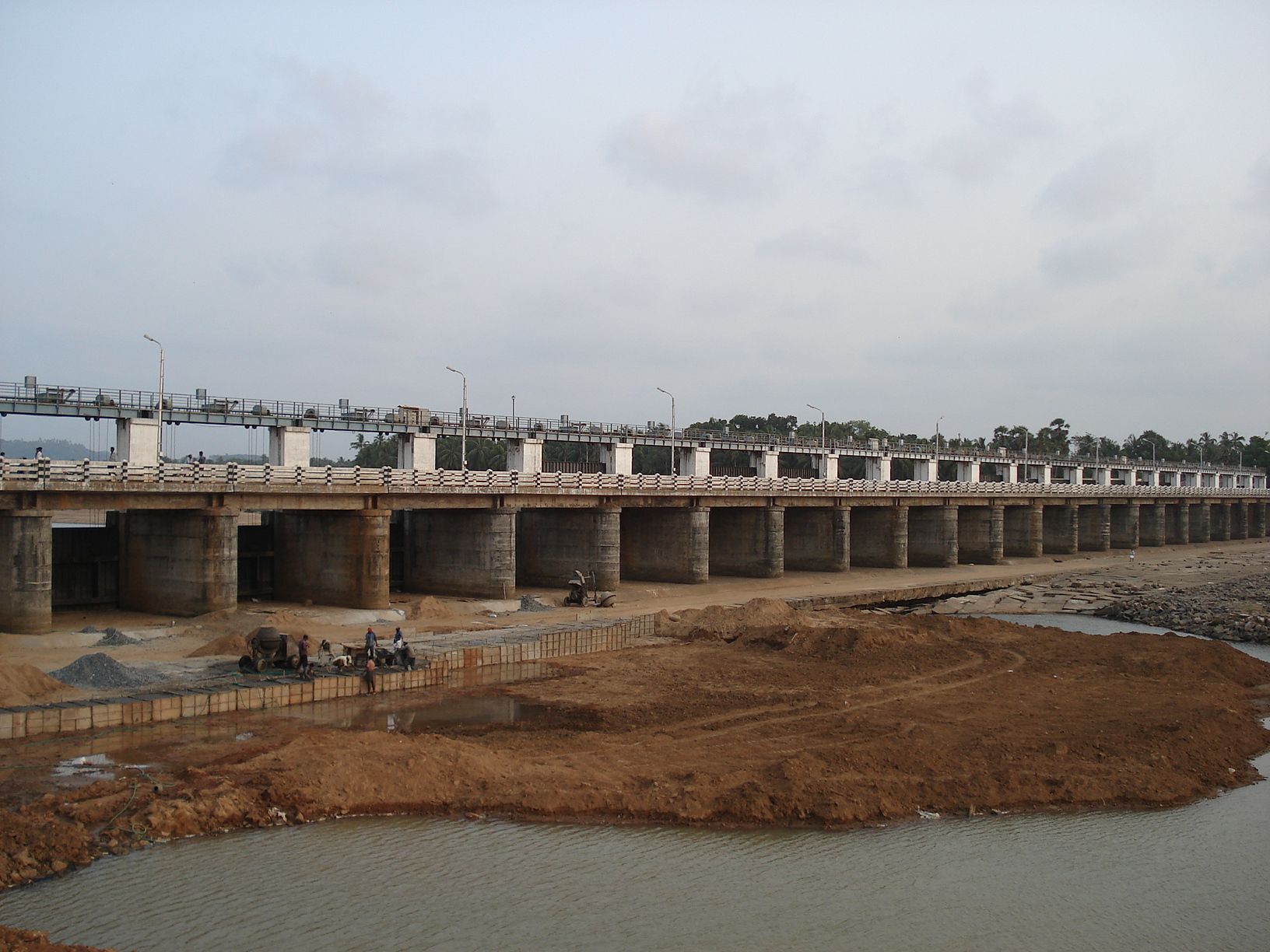
A view of the Velliyamkallu Regulator cum Bridge under construction

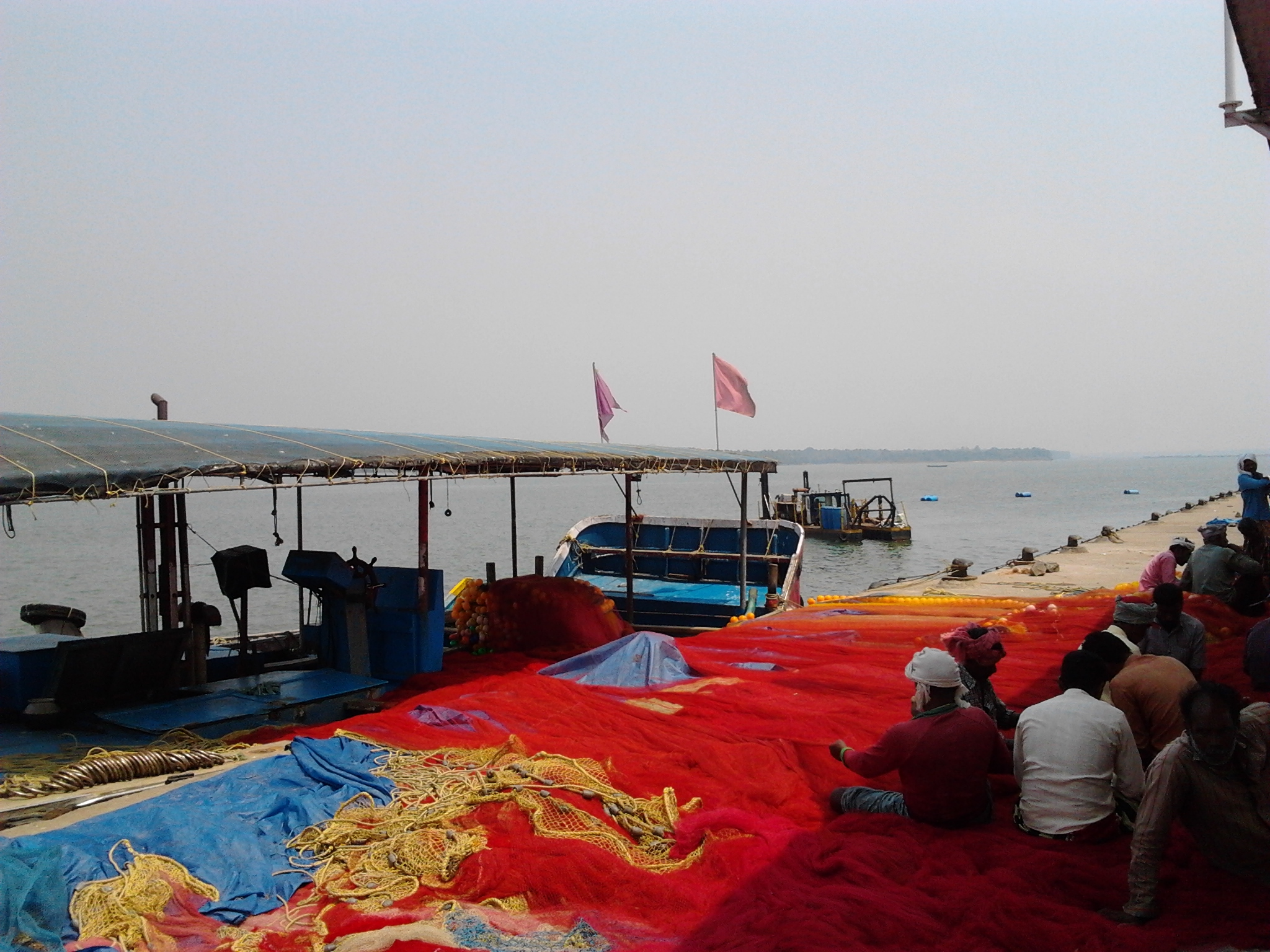
Ponnani Fishing Harbour is at the mouth of the river.

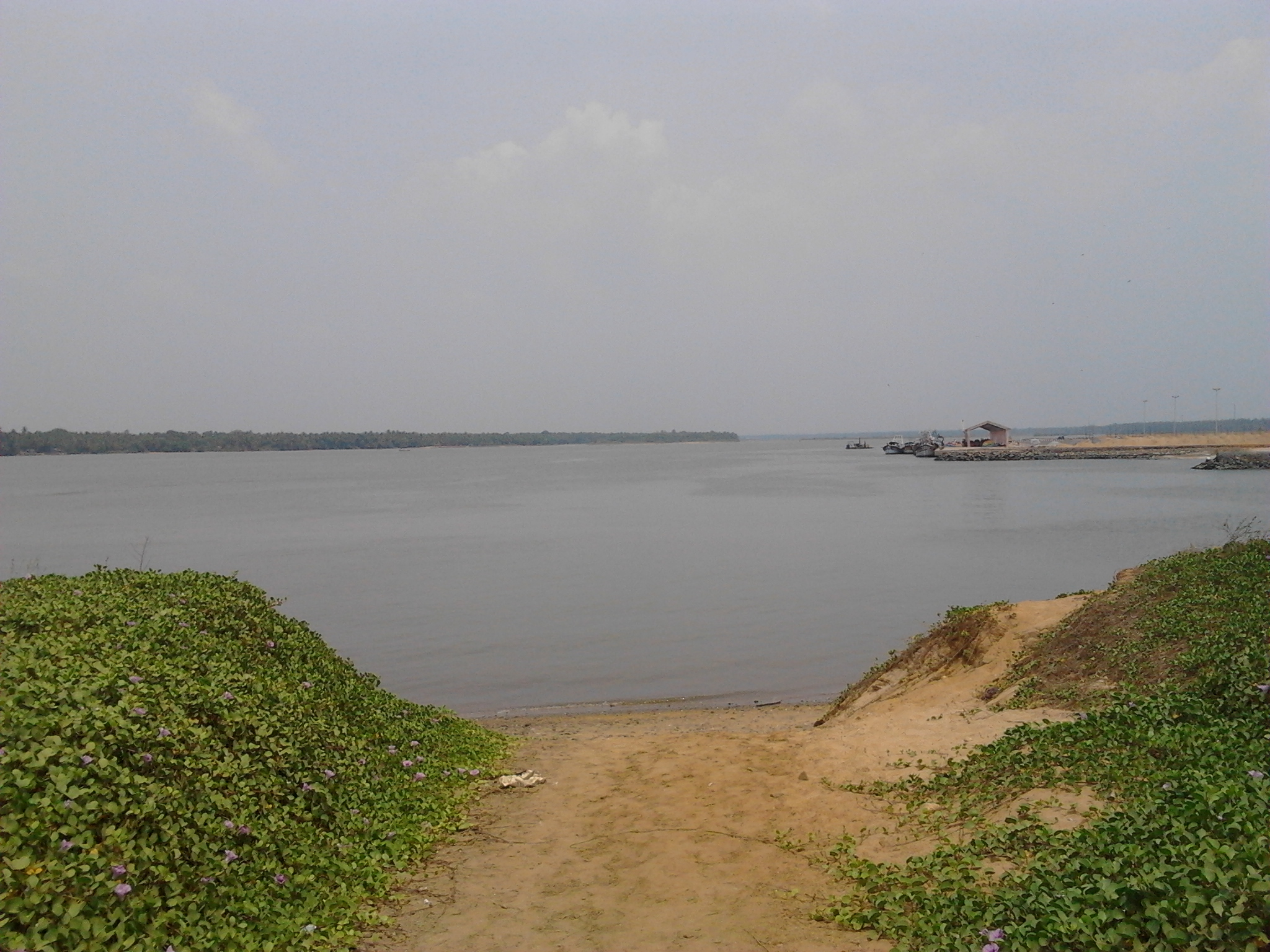
The river empties to the Arabian Sea in Ponnani.

== Cultural significance ==
Bharathappuzha is the lifeline of Kerala's cultural map. Kerala Kalamandalam, which is a major center for learning Indian performing arts like Kathakali, Koodiyattam and Ottamthullal, is situated at Cheruthuruty on the banks of this river—in Thrissur district. The birthplace of famous Malayalam satire poet and founder of the Ottamthullal art form, Kunchan Nambiar, is located at Killikkurissimangalam near Lakkidi, again on the banks of the Nila. Tholpavakoothu (around 65 temples are situated in the banks of river Nila) is a unique shadow puppet play mainly performed in the Bhadar Kali temple in the Malabar region. Azhvanchery Thamprakkal, who were the titular head of all Nambudiri Brahmins of Kerala had their land in Palakkad and later Athavanad-Tirunavaya region, situated on the basin of the river Bharathappuzha. The Kerala School of Astronomy and Mathematics flourished between 14th and 16th centuries of Common Era in Tirur-Tirunavaya-Triprangode region on the bank of the river Bharathappuzha. Leading Malayalam writers who were born along its banks include Uroob, Edasseri Govindan Nair, Akkitham Achuthan Namboothiri, M. T. Vasudevan Nair, M. Govindan, V. K. N., O. V. Vijayan, Kuttikrishna Marar, and M. Sukumaran. Late poet P. Kunhiraman Nair, a native of North Malabar, drew literary inspiration from the scenic beauty of the landscape along the Bharatapuzha. Thunchaththu Ezhuthachan and Vallathol Narayana Menon were born at the banks of Tirur River, which can be described as a tributary of the river Bharathappuzha. Many of the main members of the medieval Kerala School of Astronomy and Mathematics, including Melpathur Narayana Bhattathiri, were also born near Tirur River.Poonthanam Namboothiri and E. M. S. Namboodiripad was born near Perinthalmanna, at the bank of Thootha river, which is another tributary of the river Bharathappuzha. There are a number of famous Hindu temples like Thiruvilwamala Temple, Thirunavaya Navamukunda Temple,Vairankode Bhagavathy Temple, Chamravattam AyyappaTemple and Panniyur Sri Varahamurthy Temple on the bank of Nila. Arabi Malayalam script, also known as Ponnani script, was also born out on its bank.

Legend says that those cremated on the banks of the Bharathappuzha achieve salvation. It is also one of the important places in the state where the sons pay homage to their late fathers by conducting a Pithru Tharpanam ritual on the Karkidaka Vavu day. Some of the famous persons cremated here include literary personalities like O V Vijayan and VKN.

== Degradation ==
The river went through a series of challenges which saw its degradation that has reached a point of no return. The erratic, non-conservative attitude of people has resulted in much of its water becoming not potable. Until a few decades back, the river used to flow effortlessly during even intense summer. However, due to the sand mining in the last 30 years, the thick sand bed has been completely vanished and has then been replaced with grasses and bushes which has become an environmental catastrophe. At the peak of the sand mining period in the mid 1990s at least 40–50 lorries carrying tonnes of pristine sands were a common sight at each 'kadavu' (entrance to the river) of the river. Considering the hundreds of 'kadavu' throughout its length, the amount of sand mined in these years is unimaginable. Today, with almost no sand in many parts of the river, people have started mining sand from underwater which has become a profitable business for many. Significant changes in the climatic pattern also altered the flow pattern in the river. Studies reported that there is a significant dip in the total annual rainfall and significant increase in the annual temperature in the basin.

== Challenges ==
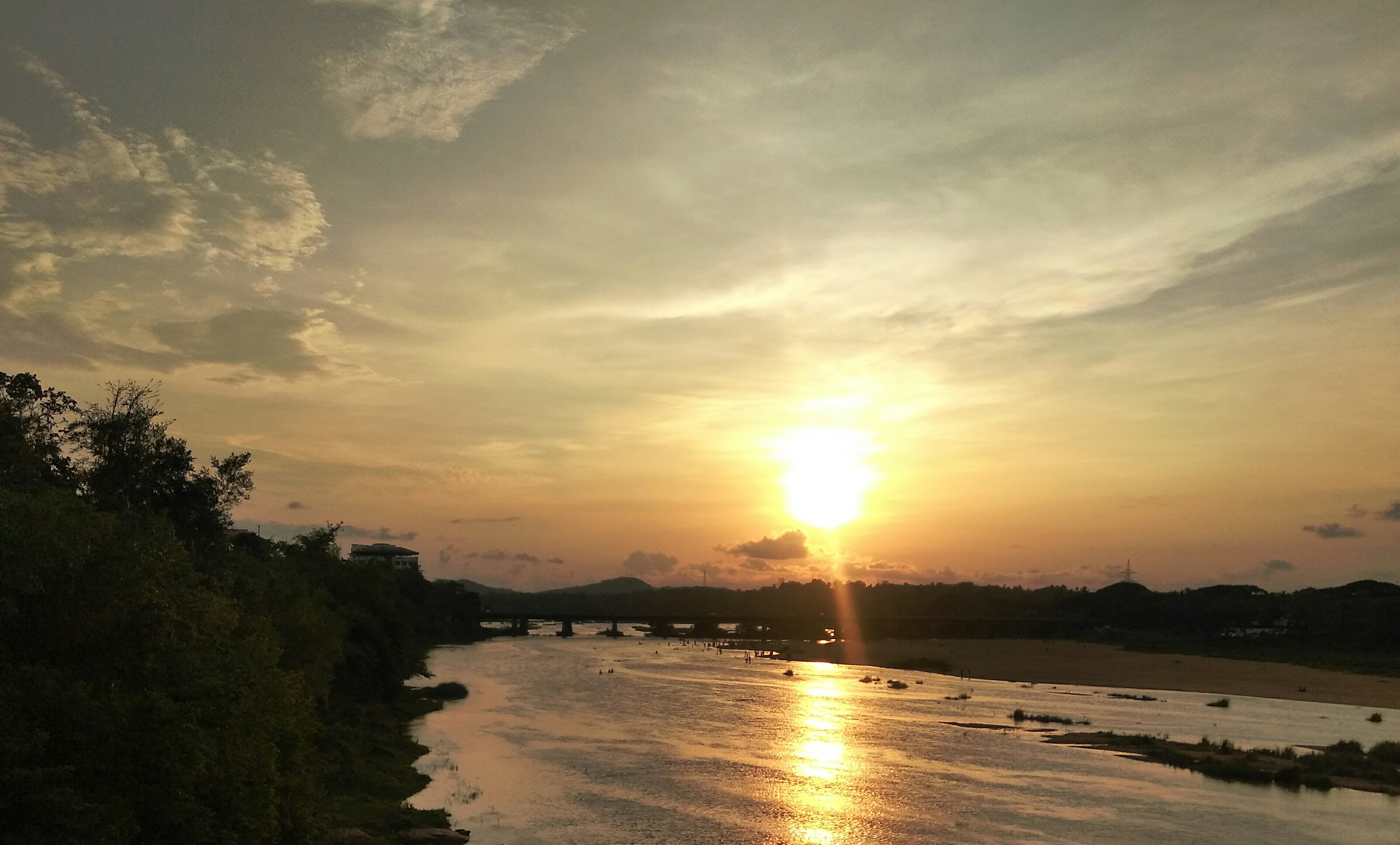
An evening near Bharathappuzha

The river now faces significant challenges for its survival. It is predicted that the river may change its course due to the obstruction of the tall grasses and bushes that has grown in the river. Illegal sand mining mafias are very active and the nexus between the politicians, bureaucrats and these mafias make it extremely difficult to stop this. Organisations which were once very active have now gone on hibernation due to the threat posed by them. Environmentalists have predicted dire consequences and the untimely death of the river within the near future. The wastes from the hospitals and other sources pollute the water.

Social networking sites like Facebook have active groups with a purpose of saving the river named as Bharathappuzha Samrakhshana Samithi.

Friends of Bharathapuzha, a nature lovers' collective, is being formed with the objective of strengthening and protecting the Bharathapuzha. It is led by E.M. Sreedharan, veteran engineer popularly known as 'Metroman'.

== Conservation ==
Environmentalists suggest the followings actions for saving the river.

- Controlled mining of the sand if not completely stopping it. Sand beds which got created in millions of years were completely removed within a few years of human greed and mismanagement. Creation of sand is a very slow process and is considered as the veins of the river. Although a total ban is impossible and impracticable, strict regulations needs to be put in place for sustainable mining of sand. Experts suggest that a portion of the revenue from sand mining has to be allocated for river management.
- Strict regulations for hotels, hospitals and households on managing their waste. Regulation has to be put in place and enforced for managing waste generated by hospitals and hotels.
- Planting trees like Banyan, Jackfruit, Teak, or Mango can enhance the water table and the water quality as these trees can hold large amount of water in its roots and will slowly discharge it during summer. This method has found to be successful in many parts of the world in reviving rivers.
- Planting and growing mangroves wherever possible: Mangroves acts a barrier protecting the river banks from soil erosion. The ecosystem within the mangroves are varied and complex and help aquatic species to thrive in rivers.
- Constructing check dams: Check dams slow down the flow of the river where by recharging the ground water and increasing the water table.

== Tributaries ==
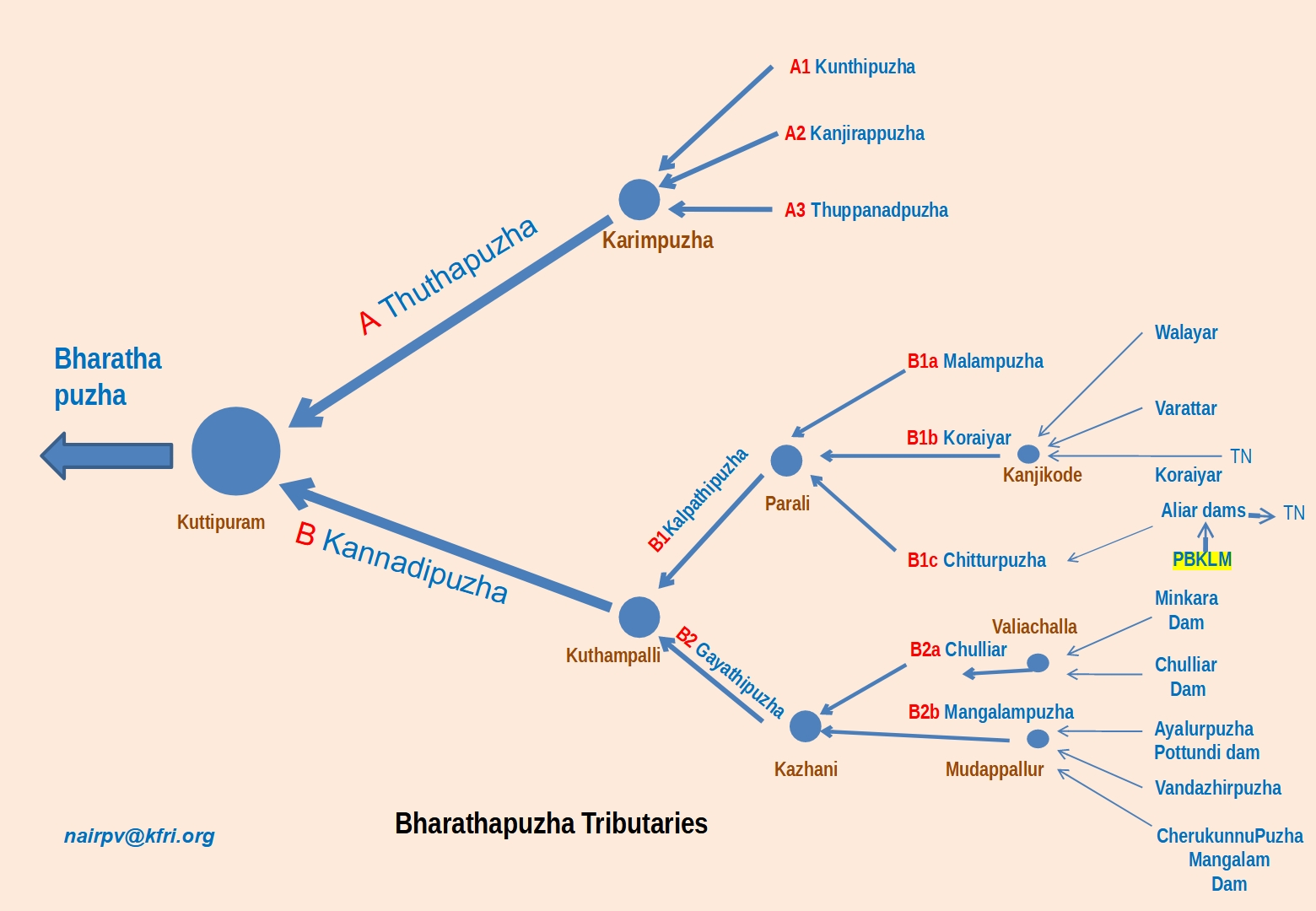
Tributaries of river Bharathapuzha

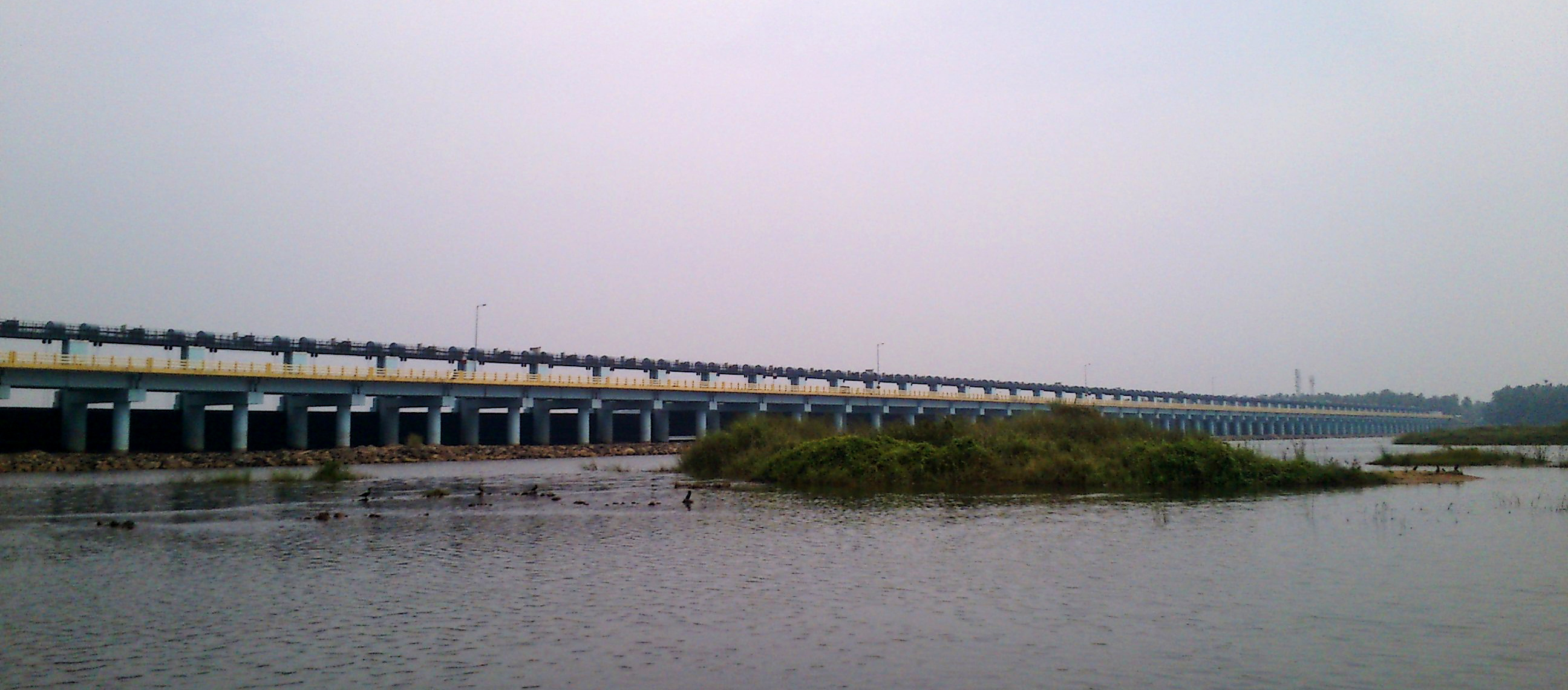
Chamravattom Regulator-cum-Bridge at Ponnani, Malappuram, the largest Regulator-cum-bridge in the state, is built over the river Bharathappuzha

Two main branches meet at Kuttipuram and flow to the Arabian Sea. Each in turn has several branches as shown in the diagram. List of the tributaries sorted in order from the mouth heading upstream.

- Thuthapuzha
  - Kunthippuzha
  - Kanjirappuzha
  - Ambankadavu
  - Thuppanadupuzha
- Gayathripuzha
  - Mangalam River
  - Ayalurpuzha
  - Vandazhippuzha
  - Meenkarappuzha
  - Chulliyar
- Kalpathipuzha
  - Korayar
  - Varattar
  - Walayar
  - Malampuzha
- Kannadipuzha
  - Palar
  - Aliyar
  - Uppar

== See also ==
- Azhvanchery Thamprakkal
- Nambudiri
- List of rivers of Kerala
- List of dams and reservoirs in Kerala
- Vairankode Vela
