= Mangalam Dam =

Dam in Kerala state of India

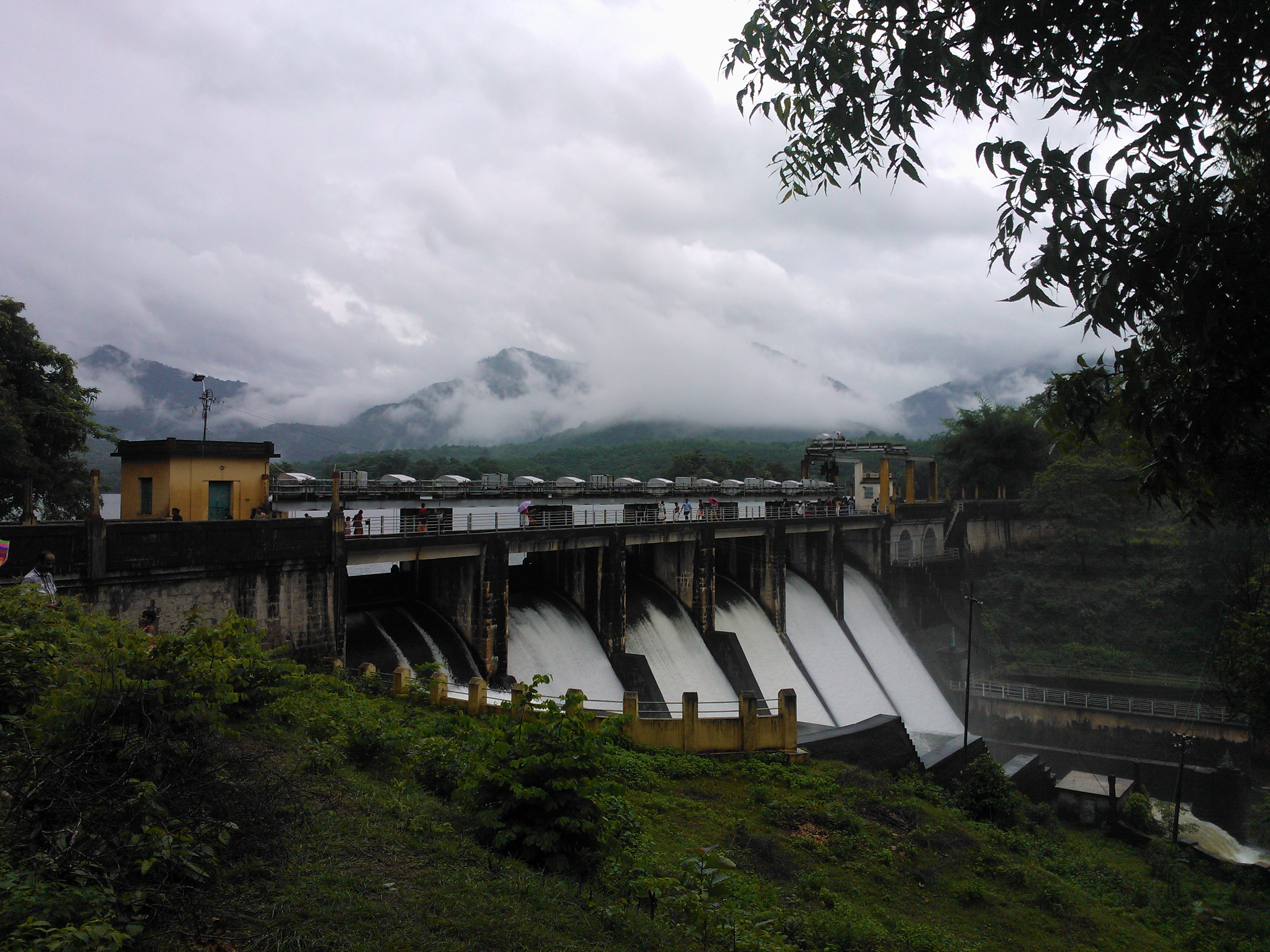
- Mangalam Dam

- Location within India Location within Kerala Location within Tamil Nadu
- Coordinates: 10°30′33″N 76°32′06″E

Dam and spillways
- Impounds: Cherukunnapuzha

Mangalam Dam is a dam built across the river Cherukunnapuzha (a tributary of Mangalam River) in Palakkad district of Kerala, India. The dam has a capacity of 25,340,000 cubic feet (718,000 m^{3}). A canal system for irrigation purposes was completed and opened in 1966, in the Alathur taluk of Palakkad district.

== Geography ==
Most of the inhabitants of the local area come from Perumbavoor Kottayam or Chalakkudy. There are rubber, pepper, coffee, and tapioca plantations in the area.

Mangalam Dam is 16 kilometres (9.9 mi) away from Vadakkencherry. Karimkayam, Earth Dam, Odenthode, Kunjiarpathy, Kavilupara, Vattapara, Neethipuram, Ponkandam, Kadappara, Uppumanne, Olipara, Balaswaram-V.R.T and Choorupara are also in the area.

A big landslide occurred in Kavilupara near to Odenthode during floods in 2007. There is a thick forest in the area of Karimkayam, Odenthode, Kadappara.

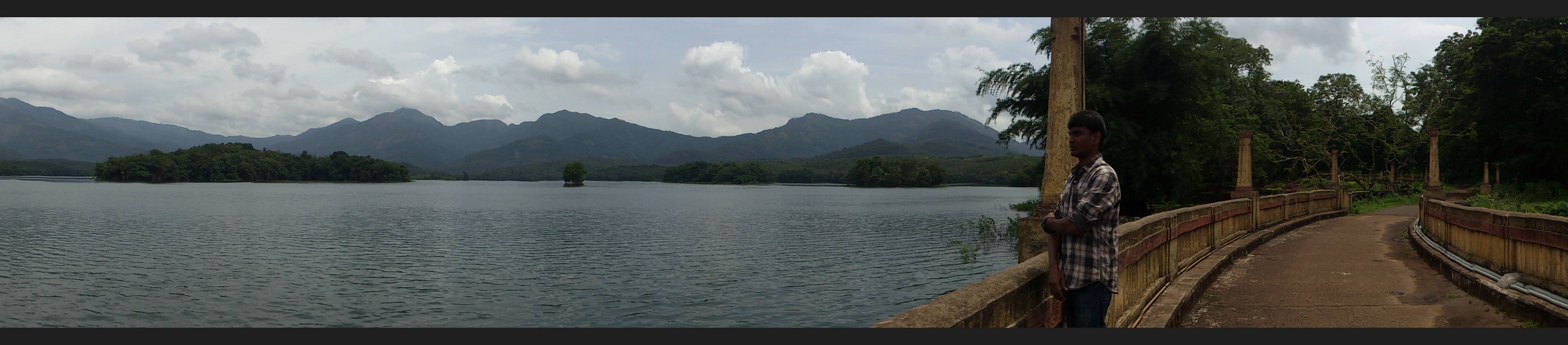
Panoramic view of Mangalam Dam
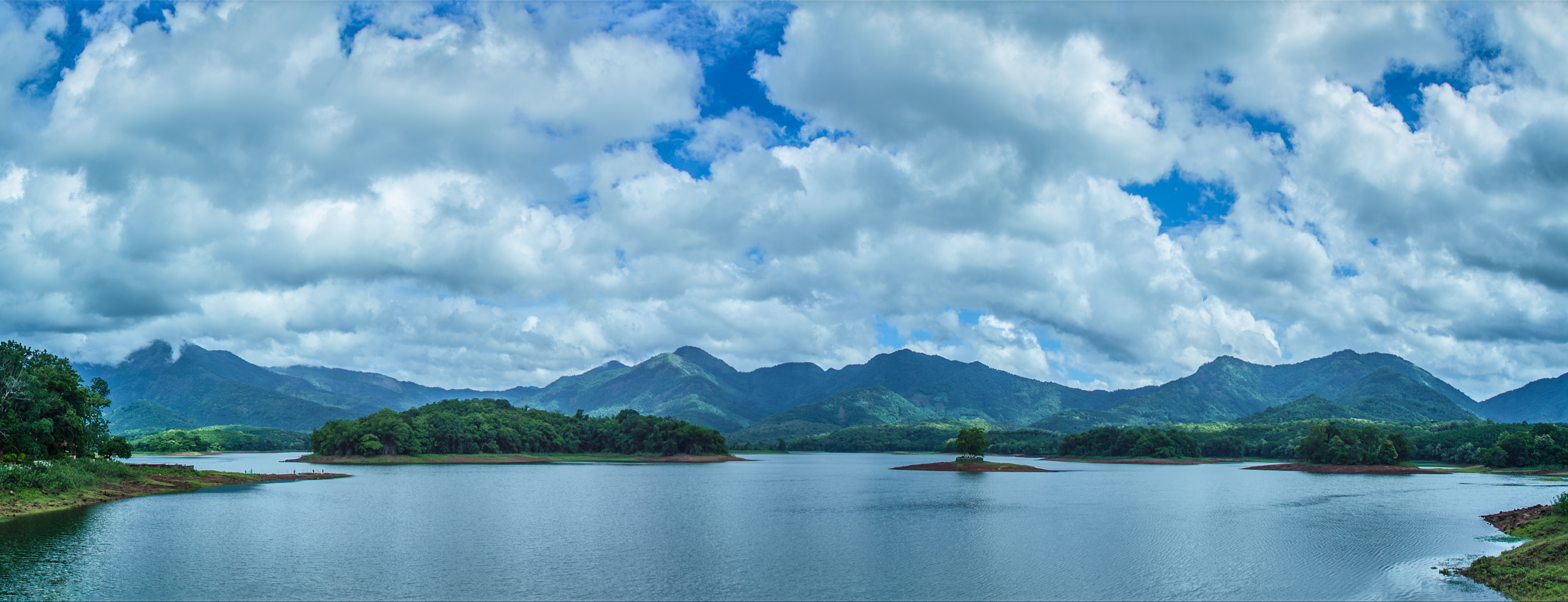
View of the Western Ghats Mountain Range from Mangalam Dam Reservoir

== See also ==
- Mangalam Dam, Palakkad
