= Mayannur =

- Village
- Mayannur, Thrissur, Kerala, India
- Coordinates: 10.7507°N 76.3811°E
- Country: India
- State: Kerala
- District: Thrissur
- Elevation: 83.13 m (272.7 ft)

Population (2011)
  - Total: 6,660

Languages
  - Official: Malayalam, English
- Time zone: UTC+5:30 (IST)
- PIN: 679105

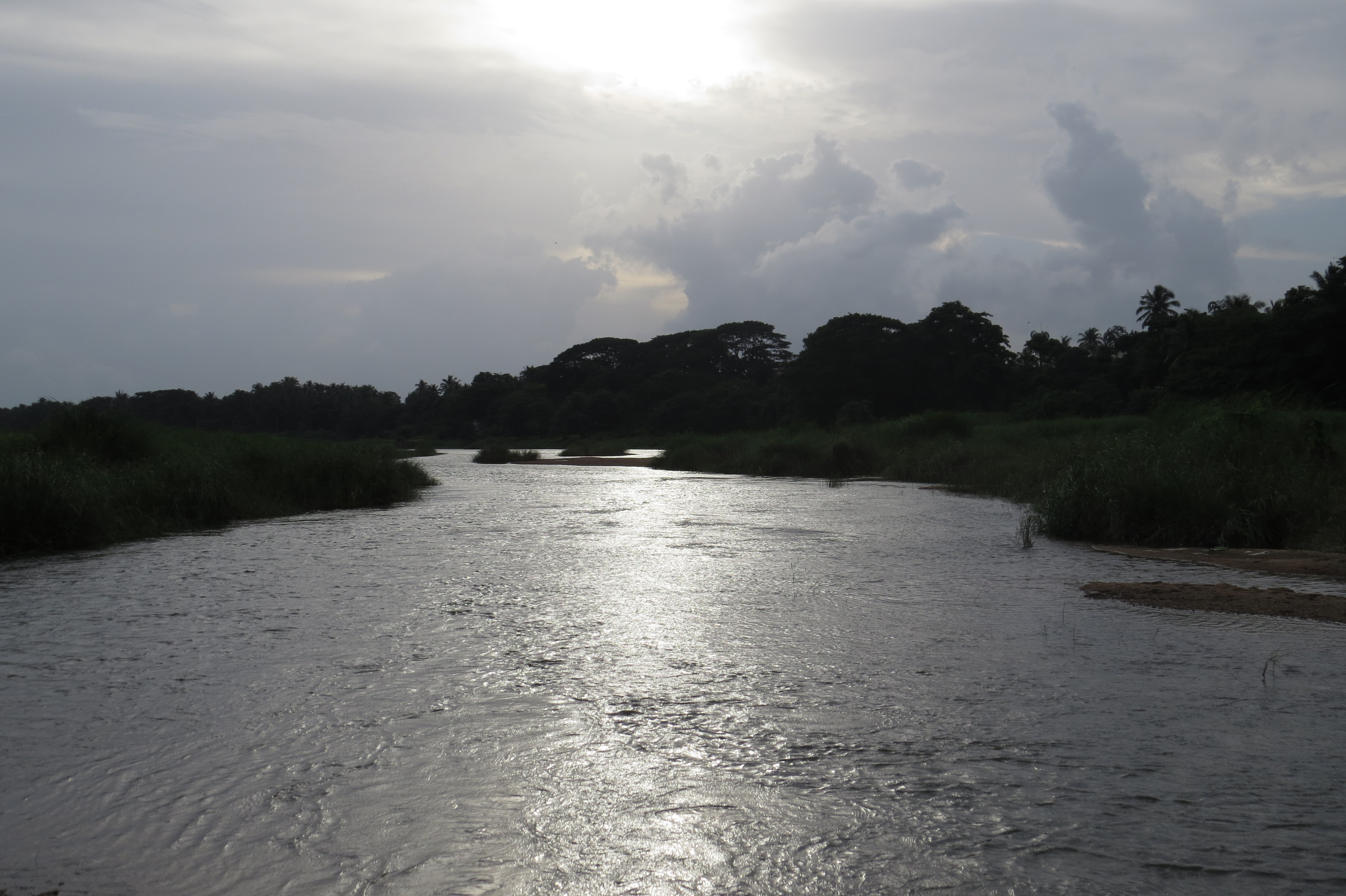
Bharathapuzha at mayannur

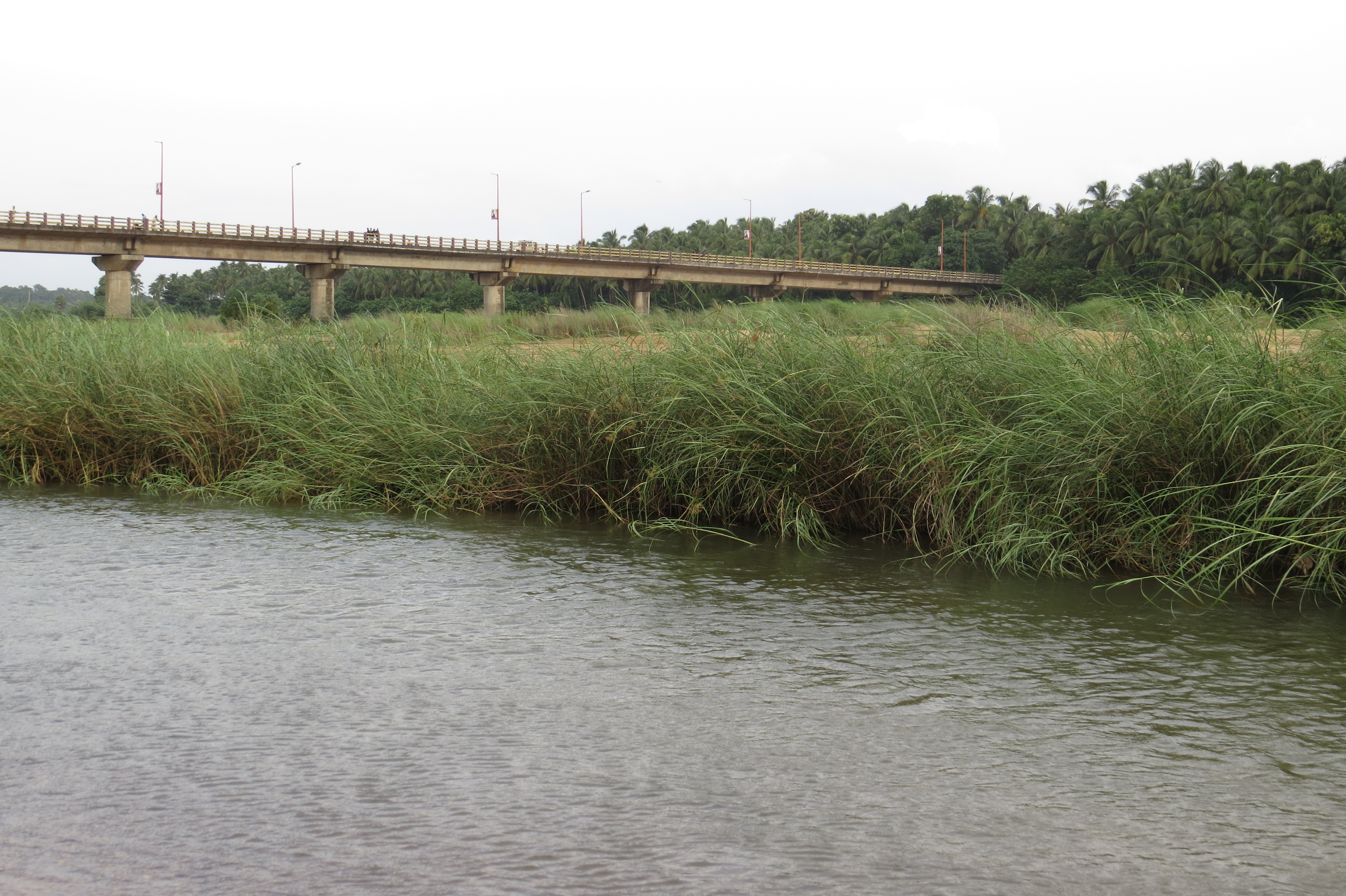
Mayannur Bridge

Mayannur is a village in Thrissur District in the state of Kerala, India.

== Demographics ==
As of 2011 India census, Mayannur had a population of 6,660 with 3,218 males and 3,442 females.

== Religion ==
A Hindu temple viz., Sri Kurumba Bhagavathy Temple is situated in Mayannur neighbourhood.
