= Mangalam Dam, Palakkad =

Mangalam Dam
- village
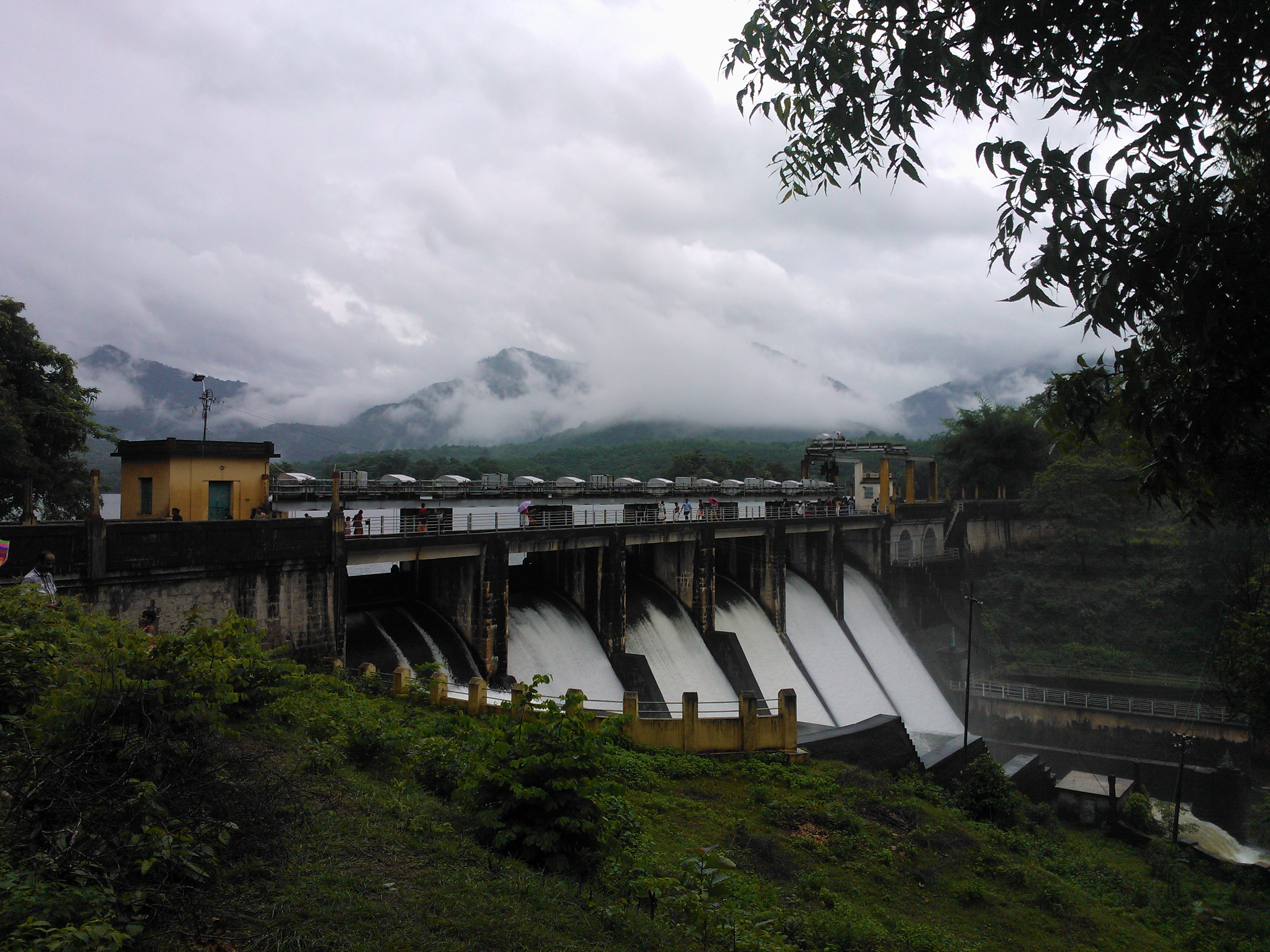

- Location in Kerala, India Mangalam Dam (India)
- Coordinates: 10°36′44″N 76°29′9″E
- Country: India
- State: Kerala
- District: Palakkad

Population (2011)
  - Total: 6,012

Languages
  - Official: Malayalam, English
- Time zone: UTC+5:30 (IST)
- PIN: 678706
- Vehicle registration: KL-49
- Nearest city: Palakkad & Trichur
- Lok Sabha constituency: Alathur
- Vidhan Sabha constituency: Alathur

Mangalam Dam is a village in the Palakkad district in the state of Kerala, India. It is administered by Vandazhy gram panchayat. This village is named after the dam of the same name situated in the region.

== Demographics ==
As of 2011 census of India, the village had a population of 6,012, comprising 2,985 males and 3,027 females.

== See also ==
- Mangalam Dam
