= Uppar River =

- Location within Tamil Nadu

Location
- Country: IND
- State: Tamil Nadu
- District: Tiruppur district

Physical characteristics
- Source: Parambikulam Aliyar Irrigation Canal Surplus Water and Rainwater in Arasur Area, Coimbatore District
  - coordinates: 10.7194288°N 77.2570697°E
- Mouth: Amaravati River
  - location: Thalakkarai, Dharapuram, Tiruppur district
  - coordinates: 10°47′09.0″N 77°32′16.6″E

Basin features
- Waterbodies: Upper Dam Reservoir

Upparu River is a river flowing in the Tirupur district of the Indian state of Tamil Nadu.

== Uppar Dam ==
Uppar Dam is built on Dhasarpatty village of Dharapuram taluk in an extent of 445.3 Acres. It benefits more than 20 villages for agriculture Irrigation and domestic purpose. It is an earthen dam constructed across the Uppar river in cauvery basin of an earthen portion of 7400 fr (2256 m) length with a masonry portion of 118 ft long to accommodate the surplus regulator consisting of 3 spars fitted with lift gates. The gross capacity of reservoir at Full Reservoir Level is 572 Mcft. Re total annual useful storage for 2 ½ filling would be 1330 Mdft. There are two canal sluice provided one on each flank of the drainage course from which the two canals take off. The right flank canal runs for length of 12.47 km and the left flank canal for a length of 17.29 km. The total ayacut localized under this scheme around 6060 acre (2448.150 hectare). Uppar is the lifeblood of various villages like Sagunipalayam, Madathupalayam, Vengitipalayam, Chinniakaundanpalayam, Rangampalayam, Velangattuputhur.

== See also ==
- List of rivers of Tamil Nadu
- Dharapuram
- Amaravati River
