= Meenkarappuzha =

River in India

Meenkarappuzha River is one of the tributaries of the river Gayathripuzha. The Gayathripuzha in turn is one of the main tributaries of the Bharathapuzha River, the second-longest river in Kerala, south India.
