= Paruthippara =

Village in Kerala, India

- Interactive map of Paruthippara
- Coordinates: 11.2000621°N 75.8481448°E

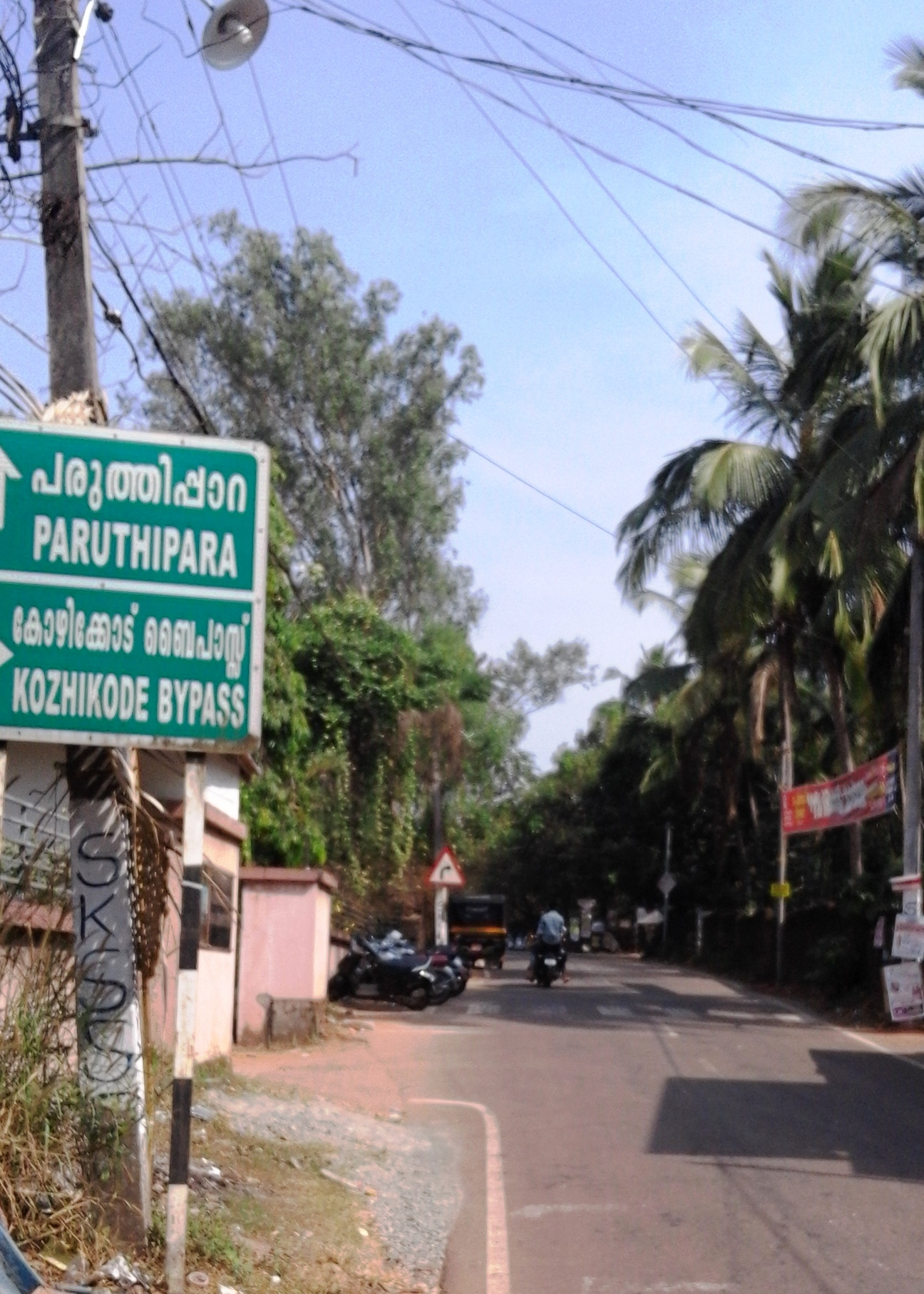
The beginning of Paruthippara Road at FIMS

Paruthippara or Kodampuzha is a small village near Feroke in Kozhikode District. The village is considered an industrial belt as a large number of small-scale are established here for a long time.

== Location ==
Paruthippara is located on a side street between Feroke Pettah and Farook College campus. The villages of Paruthippara and Kodampuzha are on the bank of river Chaliyar.

== Muslim Cultural Center ==
Paruthippara is considered a Muslim cultural center because of the presence of a large number of Madrassas and Arabic Colleges in this region.

== Important Organizations ==
- Darul Ma'arif Islamic Centre, Kodampuzha Darul Maarif Madrassa( Founded by Kodampuzha Bava Musliyar)
- Farook College
- Irashadhiya College, Thumbappadam
- Masjidhul Hudha, Koadampuzha
- Al-Manar Islamic Center, Kodampuzha
- Nest Public School
- Paruthippara Library
- Muslim Orphanage, Kodampuzha
- ALBIRR SCHOOL, KODAMPUZHA MUSLIM YATHEEMKHANA
- GMLP School, Karinkallai

== Villages and Suburbs ==
- Chandakkada, Petta, Kodampuzha and Kallivalavu
- Melepara, Kodakaparamba and Karinkallay

== Transportation ==
The nearest railway station is Feroke. There is an airport at Kondotty. Buses are available from Feroke Pettah and Ramanattukara. Bus Timings There are so many busses naming, Alfalah, Muhabath, Sreelekha, ABCD, KARINTHANDAN, KISMATH, BISMILLAH ( SHUTTLE SERVICE BETWEEN FEROKE -PARUTHIPPARA -RAMANATTUKARA) and also city buses from Paruthippara to Calicut City, Beypore, Chaliyam, and Kozhikode Medical College. bus services are starting from morning 6:30 to night 10:00. timings of buses to Paruthippara from Ramanattukara

7:20 to every 15–20 minutes interval timings of buses to Paruthippara from Feroke 07:00 am to every 10 minutes interval

== See also ==
- Kadalundi Bird Sanctuary
- Farook College
- Ramanattukara
- Vallikkunnu
- Feroke
- Chelari
- Tenhipalam
- Chelembra
