= Ramanattukara =

- Municipality/Suburb
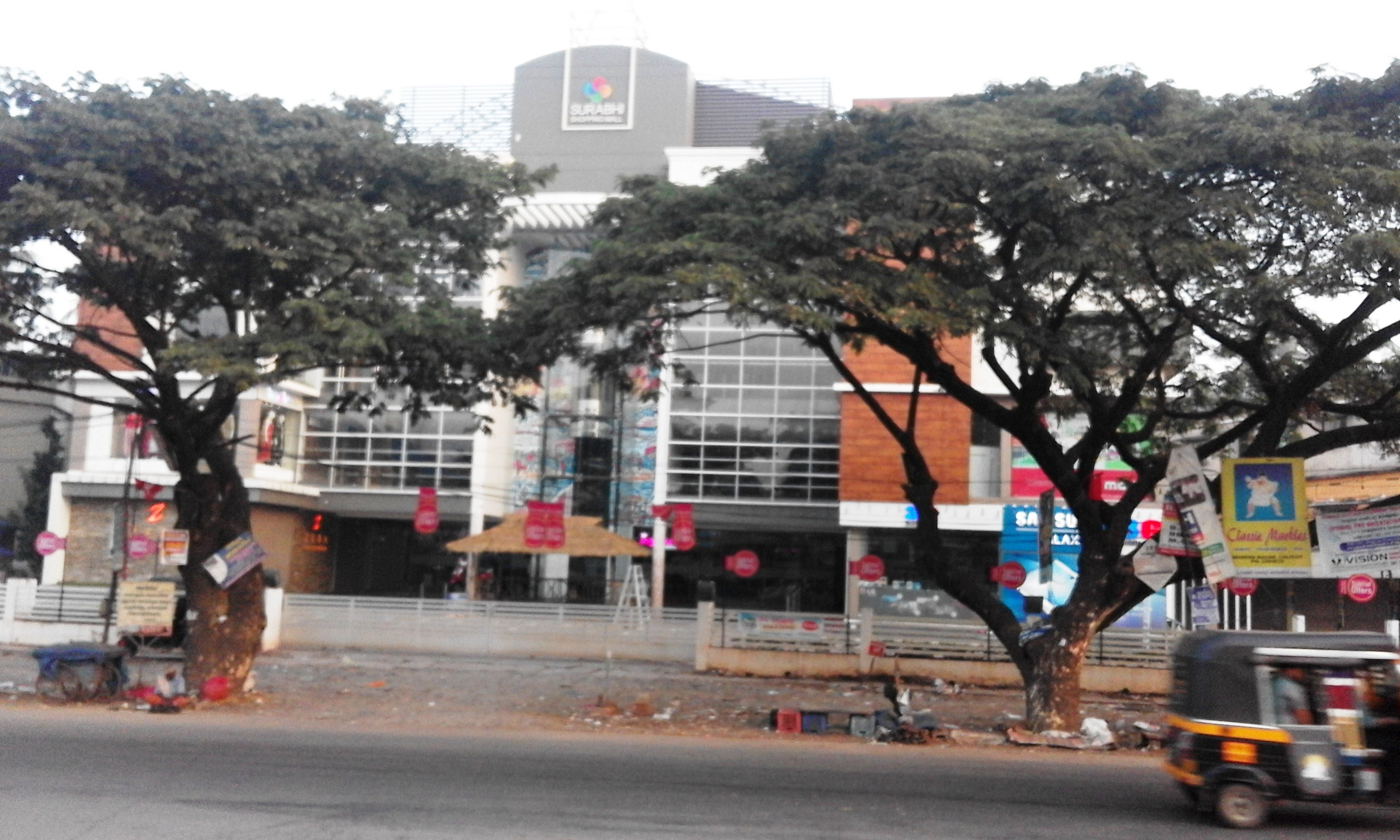
- Ramanattukara town

- Location in Kerala, India Ramanattukara (India)
- Coordinates: 11.1886744°N 75.8576775°E
- Country: India
- State: Kerala
- District: Kozhikode
- Taluk: Kozhikode
- Nearest city: Kozhikode
- Established: 1964

Government
  - Type: Municipality

Area
  - Total: 11.70 km^{2} (4.52 sq mi)

Population (2011)
  - Total: 35,937
  - Density: 3,072/km^{2} (7,955/sq mi)

Languages
  - Official: Malayalam, English
- Time zone: UTC+5:30 (IST)
- PIN: 673633
- Telephone code: 0495
- Vehicle registration: KL 85
- Sex ratio: 1000:1045 ♂/♀
- Literacy: 95.95%
- Lok Sabha constituency: Kozhikode
- Vidhan Sabha constituency: Beypore

Ramanattukara is a Municipality in Kozhikode district in the Indian state of Kerala. The town was formerly called Kadungan Chira. Ramanattukara is located 14 km south from Kozhikode city.

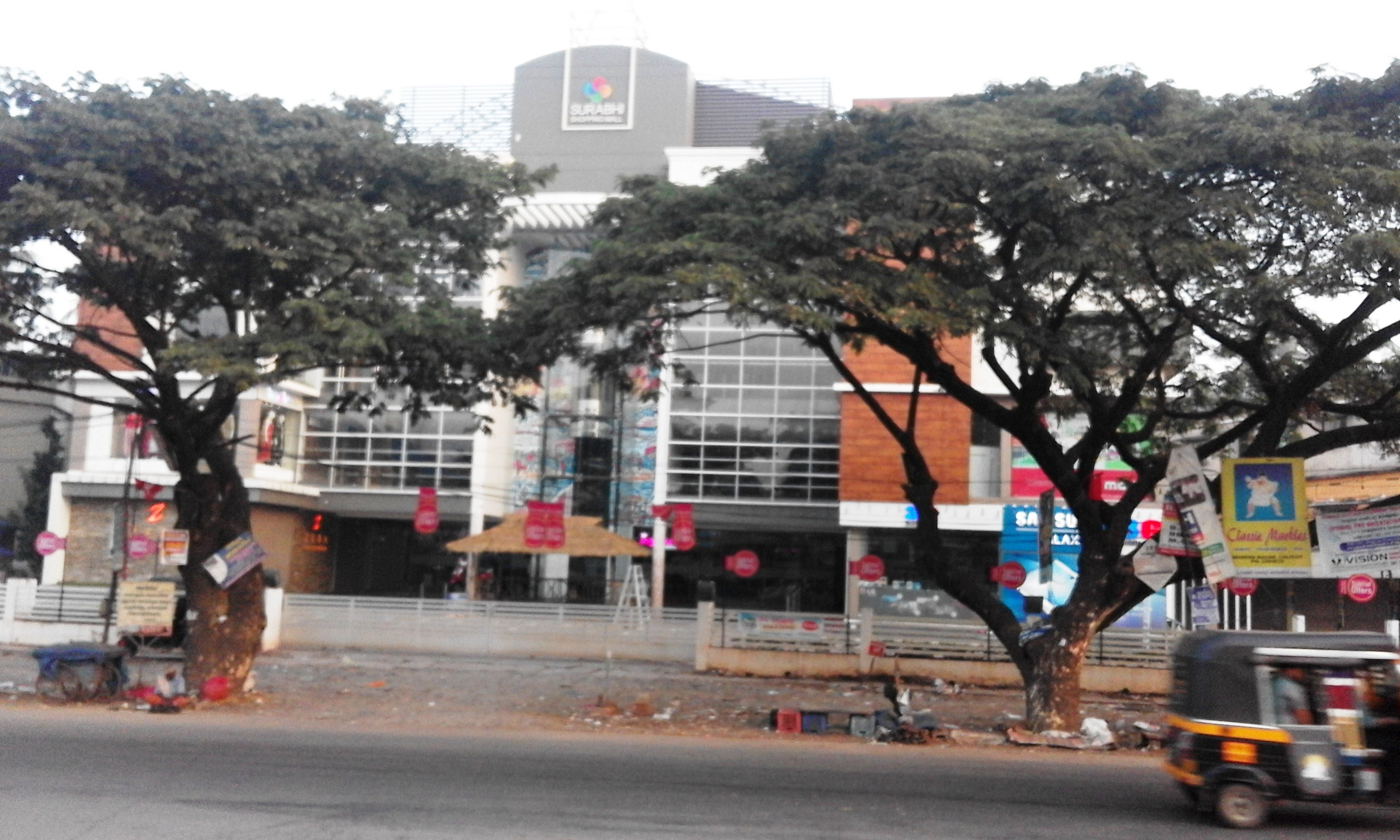
Surabhi Junction

Developing as a suburb of Kozhikode city, Ramanattukara is part of the master plan for the Kozhikode urban area.

== History ==
Ramanattukara, on the southern bank of Chaliyar river, was adjacent to the medieval kingdom of Parappanad. The Parappanad royal family is a cousin dynasty of the Travancore royal family. The rulers of Parappanad were vassals to the Zamorin of Calicut. The headquarters of the Parappanad royal family was the coastal town of Parappanangadi in present-day Malappuram district. In 15th century CE, Parappanad Swaroopam was divided into two - Northern Parappanad (Beypore Swaroopam) and Southern Parappanad (Parappur Swaroopam). Beypore, Cheruvannur, and Panniyankara, on northern bank of Chaliyar, became Northern Parappanad. Kadalundi, Vallikkunnu, and Parappanangadi, on the southern bank of Chaliyar became Southern Parappanad.

The ruler of the Kingdom of Tanur (Vettathunadu Swaroopam) was known to have assisted the Portuguese build a fort on the island of Chaliyam, which was a part of Southern Parappanad, and was destructed during the Battle at Chaliyam fort occurred in 1571. Feroke became a part of the Kingdom of Mysore in late 18th century CE. Following the Third Anglo-Mysore War and the subsequent Treaty of Seringapatam, Ramanattukara became a part of Malabar District under British Raj. Ramanattukara was included in Eranad Taluk in the Malappuram Revenue Division of Malabar District with its Taluk headquarters at Manjeri. Following the formation of the state of Kerala in 1956, Ramanattukara became a part of Tirurangadi Revenue block of Tirur Taluk. On 16 June 1969, Eranad Taluk, Tirur Taluk, Tirurangadi, and Parappanangadi, were transferred to newly formed Malappuram district. However, three Revenue Villages of Tirur Taluk, namely, Feroke, Ramanattukara, and Kadalundi, remained in Kozhikode district, as they were much closer to Kozhikode city centre. However Kadalundi Nagaram beach (where Kadalundi River flows into Arabian Sea, a part of Vallikkunnu Grama Panchayat), Tenhipalam, the centre of University of Calicut and Karippur, the site of Calicut International Airport, became parts of Malappuram. Feroke, Ramanattukara, and Kadalundi are parts of Kozhikode Taluk and Kozhikode metropolitan area.

== Demographics ==
Ramanattukara Municipality population
Year	Pop.	±%
1971	15,983	—
1981	21,131	+32.2%
1991	25,672	+21.5%
2001	30,436	+18.6%
2011	35,937	+18.1%
Source: Census of India

As of 2011 census, Ramanattukara had a population of 35,937. Males constituted 48.90% of the population and females 51.09%. Ramanattukara had an average literacy rate of 95.95%, higher than the national average of 74.04%: male literacy was 97.71%, and female literacy was 94.21%. In Ramanattukara, 11.46% of the population was under 6 years of age.

As of 2001 India census, Ramanattukara had a population of 30,436. Males constituted 49% of the population and females 51%. Ramanattukara has an average literacy rate of 83%, higher than the national average of 59.5%: male literacy is 85%, and female literacy is 80%. In Ramanattukara, 12% of the population is under 6 years of age.

== Election results ==
=== Political Performance in Election 2025 ===
2025 Ramanattukara Municipal election
- 11 December 2025

All 32 councils in the Ramanattukara Municipality 17 seats needed for a majority
- Turnout: 81.39%
	First party	Second party	Third party
Party	INC	CPI(M)	BJP
Alliance	UDF	LDF	NDA
Last election	17	12	0
Seats won	23	9	0
Seat change	6▲	3▼	0
Popular vote	12,182	10,033	2,569
Percentage	48.71%	40.11%	10.27%
Municipal Chairman before election
VM Pushpa
INC
Elected Municipal Chairman
Kallada Muhammad ali
IUML

=== Political Performance in Election 2020 ===
2020 Ramanattukara Municipal election
- 8 December 2020

All 31 councils in the Ramanattukara Municipality 16 seats needed for a majority
- Turnout: 81.91%
	First party	Second party	Third party
Party	INC	CPI(M)	BJP
Alliance	UDF	LDF	NDA
Last election	13	16	0
Seats won	17	12	0
Seat change	4▲	4▼	0
Popular vote	10,733	9,923	2,995
Percentage	44.78%	41.40%	12.49%
Municipal Chairman before election
Vazhayil Balakrishnan
CPI(M)
Elected Municipal Chairman
Bushra Rafeek
IUML

Independents won 2 seats and have 1.31% vote share in 2020 election

=== Political Performance in Election 2015 ===
S.No.	Party name	Party symbol	Number of Councilors
01	LDF		16
02	UDF		13
03	BJP		0
04	Independents		2

=== 2010 Ramanattukara Gramapanchayat Elections ===
S.No.	Political Front/Party	Number of Members
1	United Democratic Front (UDF)	11
2	Left Democratic Front (LDF)	8
3	National Democratic Alliance (NDA)	0
4	Others	0
Total		19

== Location ==
Ramanattukara is situated 16 km south of Kozhikode city. Its location on the intersection of National Highway 66 had already given its economy a boost. To top it up, now the NH bypass for Kozhikode city starts from here.

== Education ==
- Sevamandir spbhss Ramanattukara
- Ramanattukara Higher secondary school vaidyarangadi
- Government U P school Ramanattukara
- Farook arts and science college

== Transportation ==
The nearest railhead to Ramanattukara is Feroke (5 km) and the nearest airport is Calicut International Airport (10 km).

== Suburbs of Ramanattukara ==
- Azhinhilam
- Perumugham and Pullikkadavu
- Chelembra, Puthukode, Irumooliparamba and Karad
- Kottupadam, Kakkov, Channayilpalliyali and Akode
- Virippadam, Oorkkadavu and Korappadam
- Mundumuzhi and Valillappuzha
- Kuriyadam and Aikarappady
- Arulippuram, Vaidyarangadi and Pulikkal
- Adivaram, Kuttoolangadi and Koshavarangadi
- EranhikkalRoad, KrishiBhavan, Muttumkunnu and Kokkivalavu
- Kunnampallynagar, Madamthodi and Shanthinagar
- ManthriRoad, HomeoRoad, Poovannurpally and Ette-nalu
- Manthrammal road
- Farook College

== Notable people ==
- Valiyaveetil Diju, Indian Badminton player

== See also ==
- Pantheerankave
- Chelembra
- Cherukavu
- Farook College
- Feroke
- Kadalundi Bird Sanctuary
- Paruthippara
- Cheruvannur
- Idimuzhikkal
- Vazhayur
