= Kadalundi–Vallikkunnu Community Reserve =

Community reserve in Kerala

Kadalundi-Vallikkunnu Community Reserve
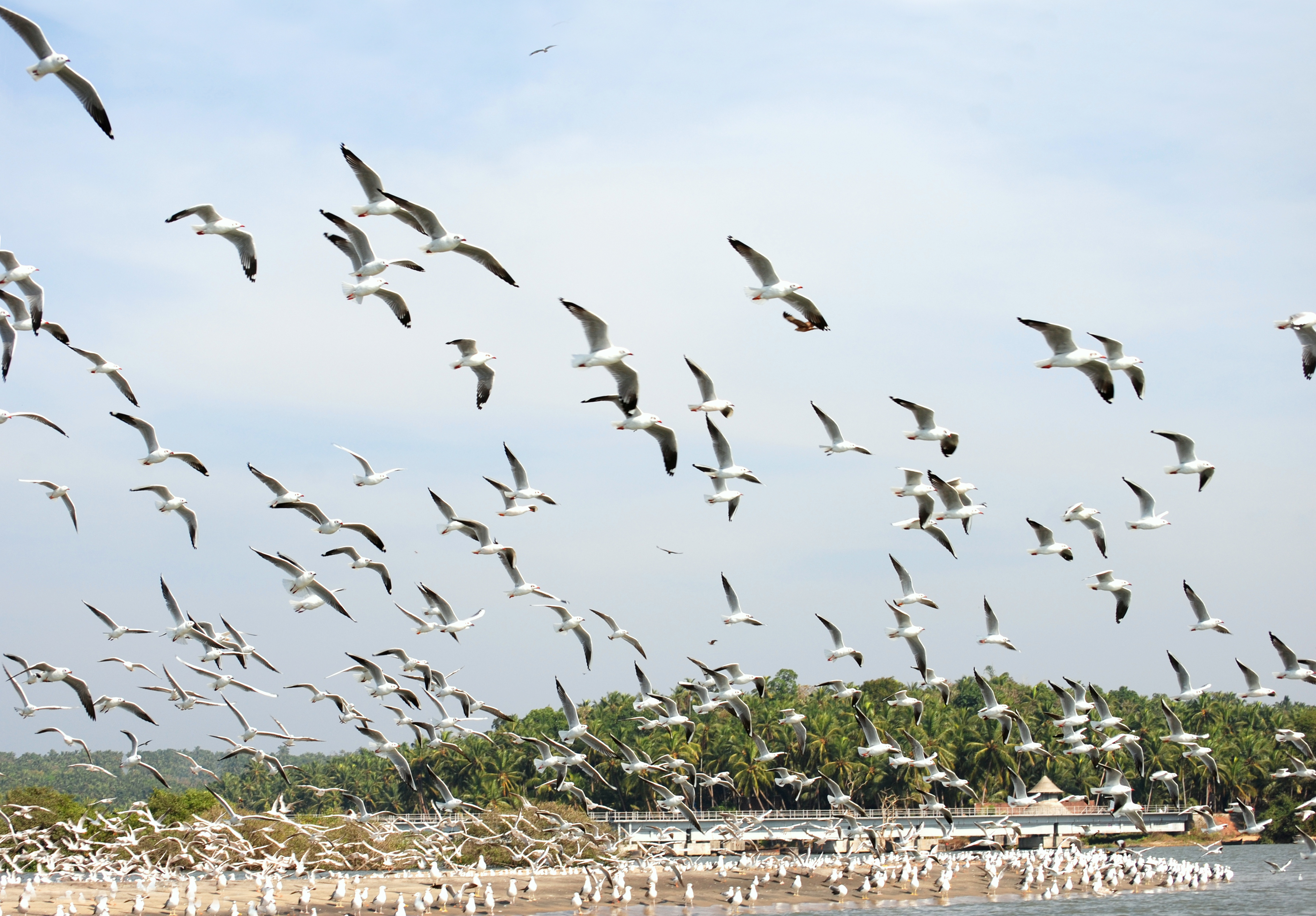

- Location within Kerala Location within India
- Location: Kerala, India
- Coordinates: 11°08′21.6″N 75°49′52.4″E
- Area: 1.5 km^{2} (0.6 sq mi)
- Established: 2007
- Governing body: Government of Kerala
- Website: Official website

Kadalundi–Vallikkunnu Community Reserve is an estuary and community reserve in Malabar Coast of Kerala state, south India. It is the first community reserve in Kerala. In 2018 April, Kerala forest department declared it as an ecotourism center.

== History ==
As per government order numbers G.O(MS)No.66/2007/F&WL dated 17-10-2007, Kadalundi–Vallikkunnu Community Reserve is established on October 17, 2007. It is the first community reserve in Kerala. In 2018 April, Kerala forest department declared it as an ecotourism center.

== Description ==
Kadalundi-Vallikkunnu community reserve is an estuary and community reserves spread over Kadalundi village in Kozhikode district and Vallikunnu village of Malappuram district in Kerala. It includes the Kadalundi Bird Sanctuary and mangrove swamps in Kadalundi and Vallikunnu region. This community reserve covers an area of 1.5 km^{2} (0.6 sq mi). Declared as a community reserve, it preserves the natural resources of the area, including the various species of flora and fauna found within a radius of 200 m on both sides of the Kadalundi River, as well as the traditional occupations and handicrafts of the locals. About 110 species of waterfowls, including 53 migratory birds, have been recorded here. It has been made a protected area considering its importance in terms of the diversity of wetland birds and the heavy anthropogenic pressure.
