= Idimuzhikkal =

Chelembra Chelembra
- Census town
- Interactive map of Chelembra
- Coordinates: 11.1519500°N 75.889290°E
- Country: India
- State: Kerala
- District: Malappuram

Government
  - Body: Panchayat

Population (2011)
  - Total: 34,149

Languages
  - Official: Malayalam, English
- Time zone: UTC+5:30 (IST)
- PIN: 673634
- Telephone code: 0483
- Vehicle registration: KL-84
- Nearest city: Kozhikode
- Lok Sabha constituency: Malappuram
- Rajya Sabha constituency: Vallikkunnu
- Civic agency: Panchayat
- Nearest Airport: Calicut International Airport
- Website: chelembrapanchayath.org

Idimuzhikkal or Chelembra is a town in Malappuram district, Kerala, India. Chelembra is the Panchayath (One of the elementary governmental ruling systems in India) and Idimuzhikal is the capital of this Panchayath.

== Location ==
Idimuzhikkal town is technically in Malappuram district but it is considered an extension of the Ramanattukara town of Kozhikode district. It is bordered by Feroke, Pallikkal, Thenjipalam, Vallikunnu, Kondotty and Kadalundi towns. The National Highway 17 transverses this township at Idimuzhikal and Kakkanchery which are three kilometers apart.

== Proposed Vallikunnu Municipality ==
The proposed Vallikunnu Municipality comprises:

- Vallikunnu panchayat
- Tenhipalam panchayat
- Chelembra panchayat

Total Area: 77.18 km^{2}

Total Population (1991 Census): 108,792

== History ==
One of the earliest mention of Chelembra comes from Logans's Malabar manual (P.649). As per this document, Chelembra came under Ramnad as a territory and acknowledged Zamorin as direct ruler.

It is also believed that Chelembra was ruled by local landlords known as Elancheeri Manazhi Moosad who reside at Elancheeri Illam, Perumannassery (Perunneeri) and their "Samantha" (servants) Nambeesans of Thiruvangattu. Thiruvangattu Shiva Temple is an important historic location in this Panchayat. The Embranthiris of Neelamana Illam also were servile to Elancheeri Moosad and assisted them in the administration of the village.

It's believed that these Neelamana Embranthiris were brought to Chelembra by the Manazhi Moosad from the northern districts of Kerala to take care of the rituals and administration of the temples of this village. The Elancheeri Sree Sankara Narayana Kshetram is believed to be constructed for the exclusive use of the members of the Manazhi Family, but later on were given to the public by the Manazhi Moosad. Adv. Anil Moosad is the present lord of the region.

During the time of his father Manazhi Sreedharan Moosad, the Sankara Narayana Temple administration was entrusted with a committee of devotees.

== Economy ==
Idimuzhikkal is one of the main commercial centers of Chelembra. It is also the capital town where the Panchayath office and Village office is located. The economy is mainly agrarian and small business oriented. Eurospin Industries, one of the main industries in Chelembra has stopped operation due to labour strikes. The Kinfra industrial facility is situated in this village which started in early 2000s.

Chelembra has witnessed a building boom in recent years, along the sides of two National Highways and a bypass road. This is particularly evident in the number of shopping complexes built in recent years. Chelembra is developing fast with the development of KINFRA industrial park at Kakkanchery by the Kerala Government. This is the first of its kind in the state. Other planned projects include the Cyber park at Ramanattukara. Close proximity to Calicut International Airport, the University of Calicut and two major national highways speeds the development of Chelembra. There ara many big projects are coming up in chelembra in the private sector. Tulah Clinical Wellness is a high-end, 30-acre integrative health retreat located in Chelembra, Kerala, India, near Kozhikode International Airport. Spearheaded by UAE-based entrepreneur Faizal Kottikollon of KEF Holdings, the $100 million project aims to combine traditional Eastern healing practices with modern clinical diagnostics. The retreat officially opened its doors in February 2025.

=== Traditional Weavers ===
Once Idimuzhikkal was known for the traditional weavers of Idimuzhikkal Theru. They spin cotton yarn from the fibre and then made cotton towels and cloth from this yarn. The cotton face towels known locally as "thorthu" was sold throughout the area and in the nearby cities, Kozhikode. The traditional weavers of Idimuzhikkal belonged to a particular community known as Shaliya, Chettiyar, or Padma Shaliya. They lived in small communes, called 'theru', and they worshipped Lord Ganapathy as their deity. There are 'theru' in different parts of the state. The main source of income of Idimuzhikkal was from this traditional weaving industry. Some still continue with this profession.

Specially trained carpenters of this region make the weaving machinery, which is called 'thari'.

== Politics ==
People of Chelembra is active in politics also, perhaps Indian Muslim League will be the party which has the largest number of registered members, followed closely by Indian National Congress. Communist (Marxist)Party of India, BJP and other such socio-political parties are also alive here.

One of the early socio-political activity is linked to the road development in Kolakkuth area. The area was disconnected from public transport for several decades after Indian independence. In response to that, the villagers under the leadership of Unnikrishnan Nair, Appukkutty Master, Kalliyil Raman Nair, R V Govindan Nair, Ratnakaran Nair, Andissery Narayanan, Andissery Narayanan Master, Kalliyil Narayanan Nair and Nandillath Rajan along with several others formed a committee for development of Idimuzhikkal- Agrasala road. Archival documentation of the legal proceedings remains limited; however, multiple independent oral testimonies converge on the occurrence of land disputes during this road construction. This road development led to subsequent overall development of the region including subsequent bus service.

== Important Landmarks ==
There are some prestigious educational institutions in Chelembra- Bhavan's Vidyashram located at Idimuzhikkal, Devaki Amma college of Pharmacy and Devaki Amma Memorial Guruvayoorappan College of Architecture, Narayanan Nair Memorial Higher Secondary School, Subramanya Vilasam Aided Upper Primary School, Alikkutty Moulavi Memorial Upper Primary School, Kolakattuchakli UP School, Perunthodippadam UP School etc. are some of them. Narayanan Nair School was established in 1976 at Pulliparamba in Chelembra.

Thiruvangat Siva temple, Elannummel Shiva temple, Perumannassery Sankaranarayana temple, Subramannya Swami temple, Theru Maha Ganapathi temple, Ayyappa Bhajana Madom, Idimuzhikkal, Chelooppadam Mosque, Elannummal Mosque, Kuroangoth Mosque, Perunneeri Mosque, Panayappuram juma Masjid etc. are a few of the places of worship in Chelembra. Another noted places of worship include Pullancheeri Kavu, Panengal Kavu, Pullipparambu Bhajanamadom etc.

Darul Irshad Shariath College is situated on Kolakuth road. Devaki Amma Training College and Narayanan Nair High School are also situated nearby. Elannummel Shiva Temple at Kolakkatuchaly attracts many devotees. Noorul Hudha school is at Muthirapparamba.

== Culture ==
There are many temples and mosques in the panchayath of Chelembra. The common Hindu festivals include the several "utsavams" celebrated in small temples, during which "theyyam" and "thira" will be on display. Duff Muttu, Kolkali and Aravanamuttu are common folk arts of this locality among Muslim population. There are many libraries attached to mosques giving a rich source of Islamic studies. Most of the books are written in Arabi-Malayalam which is a version of the Malayalam language written in Arabic script. People gather in mosques for the evening prayer and continue to sit there after the prayers discussing social and cultural issues. Business and family issues are also sorted out during these evening meetings.

[2]

== Education ==
There are several elementary/ upper primary schools including Chelembra ALPS, Elannummal AMLPS, Kolakattuchali ALPS, Perumthodipadam AMLPS, Pullinkunnu ALPS, Chelembra SVAUPS and Chelupadam AMMAMUPS. The highschool in this panchayath is NNMHS, Chelembra.

Chelembra is now becoming a noted education centre also. Bhavans have a CBSE higher secondary school, law college, teacher's training centre and a junior college. Another noted educational institution is Naarayanan Nair Memorial Institutions, Devaki Amma Colleges and Manhajur Rashad Islamic college affiliated to Darul Huda Islamic University Chemmad. There are BEd, DEd, MEd, colleges, Postgraduate Pharmacy colleges, Higher Secondary schools, College of Architecture and junior schools by this group. The Subrahmanya Vilasam Aided Upper Primary (SVAUP)School is one of the noted educational institution of this area. Another educational institution is The Chelooppadam UP School.

== Public health ==
There is a health centre at Chelooppadam near the Poolappoyil area which caters to the needs of the local people. An ayurvedic health centre also is functioning at Kunool Valavu in the Ambalakkandi Parambu.

Mission First Aid 

Chelembra is recognized for its community-based emergency preparedness initiatives. On 3 August 2019, the then Kerala Minister for Health and Social Justice, K. K. Shailaja, officially declared Chelembra as India’s First First Aid Literate Panchayat under the Mission First Aid initiative. The programme aimed to improve community preparedness by equipping residents with essential life-saving skills, including first aid, cardiopulmonary resuscitation (CPR), and emergency response before professional medical assistance arrives. The initiative received coverage in national and regional media, including The Hindu and Mathrubhumi. (Onmanorama)

Mission First Aid is a community health initiative that promotes first aid literacy, CPR training, emergency preparedness, and public awareness of Automated External Defibrillators (AEDs). The initiative seeks to strengthen community-based emergency response by enabling trained bystanders to provide immediate assistance during medical emergencies.

The initiative was led by Dr. Vimal K. R., Professor at Devaki Amma Memorial College of Pharmacy, and Founder and Chairman of Healing Hands Foundation. Through Healing Hands Foundation and Devaki Amma Memorial College of Pharmacy, the programme organized structured first aid and CPR training programmes for healthcare professionals, students, teachers, volunteers, and members of the public.

Following the successful implementation of the Chelembra initiative, Mission First Aid continued to promote the vision of a “First Aid Literate India” through community awareness campaigns, first aid and CPR training programmes, and emergency preparedness initiatives in different parts of the country. The programme advocates the development of sustainable community emergency response systems with the long-term goal of ensuring that every community has trained first responders capable of providing immediate care until professional medical services arrive.

References 

1. The Hindu. “Chelembra is maiden first-aid literate society.” 3 August 2019.

   https://www.thehindu.com/news/national/kerala/chelembra-is-maiden-first-aid-literate-society/article28815801.ece

2. Mathrubhumi English. “Chelembra to be first panchayat that has first aid literacy in India.”

   https://english.mathrubhumi.com/news/kerala/chelembra-to-be-first-panchayat-that-has-first-aid-literacy-in-india–1.4011636

3. Onmanorama. “Pharmacy college students in Malappuram make sanitizers to join fight against COVID-19.” The article notes that Chelembra became the country’s first “100% first aid literate” panchayat through the efforts of the college, Healing Hands Foundation, and the Panchayat. (Onmanorama) 4. Mission First Aid – Devaki Amma Memorial College of Pharmacy (Official project page). 5. Healing Hands Foundation (Official website).

== Transportation ==
Idimuzhikkal town connects to other parts of India through Feroke town. National highway 66 passes through Idimuzhikkal and the northern stretch connects to Goa and Mumbai. The southern stretch connects to Cochin and Trivandrum. State Highway No.28 starts from Nilambur and connects to Ooty, Mysore and Bangalore through Highways.12,29 and 181. The nearest airport is at Kozhikode. The nearest major railway station is at Parappanangadi.

One of the earliest roads in Chelembra was Idimuzhikal- Cheloopadam- Kolakkuth road. This road is now part of the PWD road network.

Chelembra is close to Kadalundippuzha, which allows access to water transportation extending all the way till Kozhikode and beyond.

The nearest airport is Calicut international airport which is around 10 kilometers away from Idimuzhikkal.

== Industry ==
One of the earlier industries were the Chelembra Spinning mill where several thousand employees worked. The company was closed in 1990s due to labour unrest. Kakkanchery technopark (KINFRA) was later opened which has attracted several information technology and food technology companies.

== Suburbs and Villages ==
- Chakkulangara, Kolakkattu Chali and Paingotoor
- Pulliparamba, Elannummal, Kolakkuth, Perunneeri aka Perumannassery
- Panayapuram, Chaliparambu, Perunthodipadam and Kuttippala
- Parayil Bazar, Chelooppadam and Kakkanchery.
- Edandappadam, Puliyasheri Vishnu Temple
- Kottappuram Road, Kohinoor, Thenhippalam
- Padikkal, Velimukku and Thalappara
- Chelupadam and Punchirivalavu
- Koonoolvalavu, Kattukuzhingara and Perumannasseri
- Natakassery, Pullipparamba and Kolakkuth
- Kolakkattuchaly, Kolakkuthu, Kandayipadam, Elannummel and Muthirapparamba
- Olipram pathinalu and Olipram Pathinanchu

== Tourist Attraction ==
The village still retains its rustic beauty; several ponds, especially the Appat pond, along with tiny brooks that weave across the expanse of paddy fields, are the main attractions of this village. The village rest on the banks of branches of Kadalundi River and Chaliyar River which originates from Neelithode of Ramanattukara. The Kadalundi Bird Sanctuary spreads over a cluster of islands where the Kadalundipuzha River flows into the Arabian Sea. There are over a hundred varieties of native birds and around 60 varieties of migratory birds that come here in large numbers annually. Idimuzhikkal/Ramanattukara is the main town, Kakkanchery is another developing town; both situated by National Highway 17. Now the road-widening efforts initiated by the National Highways Authority have totally changed the facade of this town.

== See also ==
- Kadalundi Bird Sanctuary
- Paruthippara
- NNMHSS CHELEMBRA
- Farook College
- Ramanattukara
- Vallikkunnu
- Feroke
- Chelari
- Tenhipalam
- Cherukavu
- Chelembra
