= Chelari Airport =

Airstrip in Kerala, India

Coordinates: 11.1113°N 75.8883°E

Chelari Airport was an airstrip built in 1962 in Chelari, it was owned by Birla group, they used this airport for traveling to their factory in Calicut, it was located in Chelari, Tenhipalam village panchayat in Malappuram district of Kerala, now the area is owned by the Indian Oil Company.

== History ==
Chelari Airport is an airport built in 1962 in Chelari, it was a domestic airport. Its runway was adjacent to the national highway and traffic on the national highway was blocked before the plane landed. Single engine planes land here. After the plane landed, a rope was attached and entry was prohibited.

Indira Gandhi and her son Rajiv Gandhi have landed here. When Indira Gandhi and her family came to visit Thirurangadi Yatimkhana and also after Indira's death Rajiv Gandhi came down to Chelari twice when he became the Prime Minister.

== Plane crash ==
On 17 January 1969, a Douglas C-47A VT-DTH cargo plane owned by Hindu Publications crashed here. The plane crashed when it was trying to take off after dropping the newspapers at Chelari. The pilot and co-pilot were killed in the crash. This was one of the first disasters in Kerala.
