= Kadalundi =

Kadalundi Kadalku
- Village
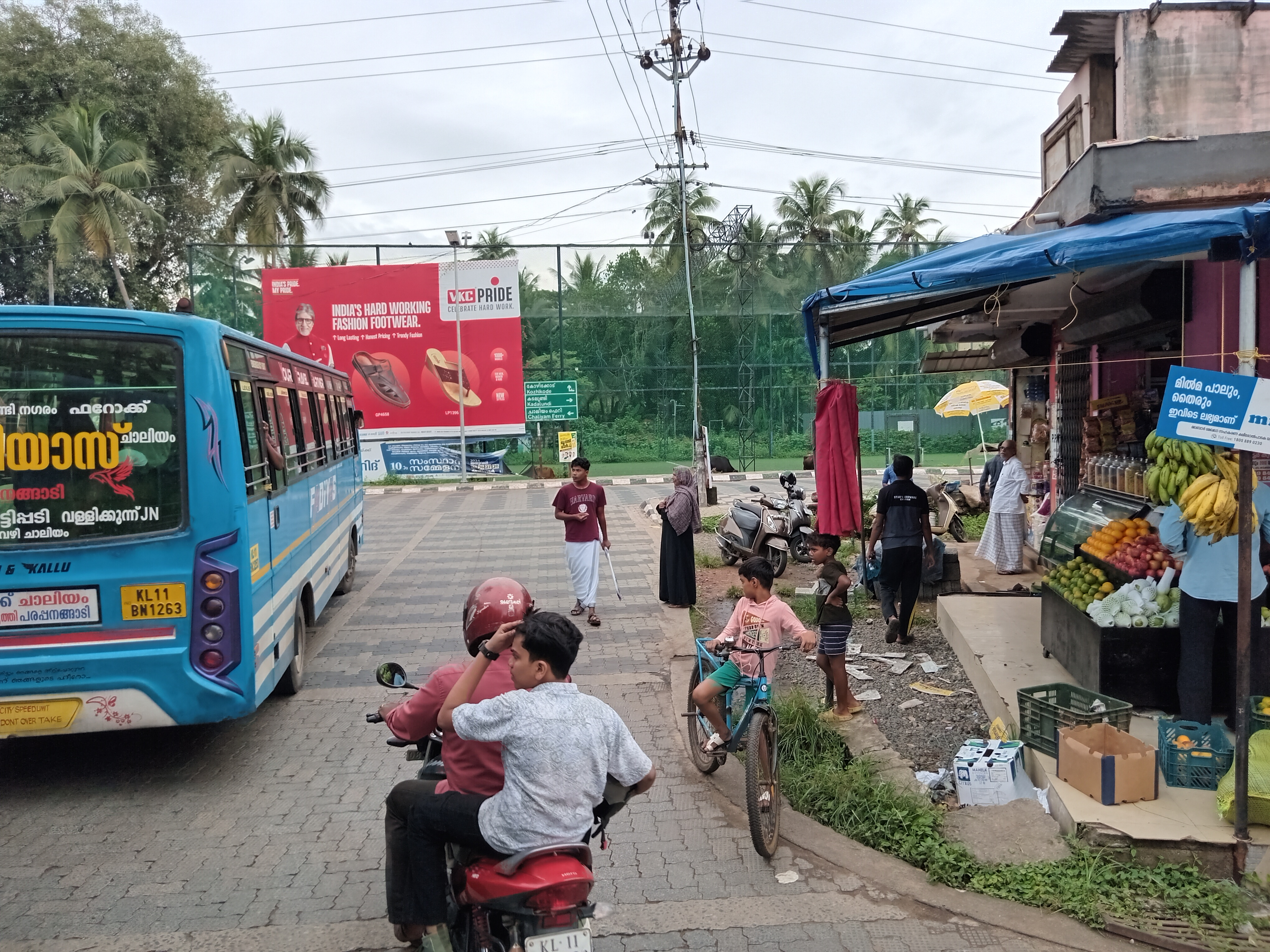
- Kadalundi Town

- Location in Kerala, India Kadalundi (India)
- Coordinates: 11°8′9.228″N 75°49′37.174″E
- Country: India
- State: Kerala
- District: Kozhikode

Area
  - Total: 12 km^{2} (4.6 sq mi)

Population (2011)
  - Total: 42,516
  - Density: 3,500/km^{2} (9,200/sq mi)

Languages
  - Official: Malayalam, English
- Time zone: UTC+5:30 (IST)
- PIN: 673302
- Telephone code: 0495
- Vehicle registration: KL-85
- Nearest city: Kozhikode
- Lok Sabha constituency: Kozhikode
- Climate: Tropical monsoon (Köppen)
- Avg. summer temperature: 35 °C (95 °F)
- Avg. winter temperature: 20 °C (68 °F)

Kadalundi is a village in Kozhikode district, Kerala, India. It is a coastal village close to the Arabian Sea. Kadalundi is famous for its bird sanctuary, which is home to various migratory birds during certain seasons and has been recently declared as a bio-reserve. The Kadalundi–Vallikkunnu Community Reserve is the first community reserve in Kerala. The Kadalundi River and the Chaliyar river, two of the longest rivers of Kerala, merge with the Arabian Sea at Kadalundi. The first railway line in Kerala was laid in 1861 from Tirur to Chaliyam through Tanur, Parappanangadi, Vallikkunnu, and Kadalundi. Kadalundi panchayat shares the borders with Kozhikode corporation and feroke municipality. Kadalundi is a part of the Kozhikode urban area master plan.

== History ==
Names, routes and locations of the Periplus of the Erythraean Sea (1st century CE)

Kadalundi-Chaliyam-Beypore region had trade relations with foreign countries like Rome and Arabia. Tyndis was a major center of trade, next only to Muziris, between the Cheras and the Roman Empire. Pliny the Elder (1st century CE) states that the port of Tyndis was located at the northwestern border of Keprobotos (Chera dynasty). The North Malabar region, which lies north of the port at Tyndis, was ruled by the kingdom of Ezhimala during Sangam period. According to the Periplus of the Erythraean Sea, a region known as Limyrike began at Naura and Tyndis. However the Ptolemy mentions only Tyndis as the Limyrike's starting point. The region probably ended at Kanyakumari; it thus roughly corresponds to the present-day Malabar Coast. The value of Rome's annual trade with the region was estimated at around 50,000,000 sesterces. Pliny the Elder mentioned that Limyrike was prone by pirates. The Cosmas Indicopleustes mentioned that the Limyrike was a source of peppers.

According to the Legend of Cheraman Perumals, the first Indian mosque was built in 624 AD at Kodungallur with the mandate of the last the ruler (the Cheraman Perumal) of Chera dynasty, who converted to Islam during the lifetime of Muhammad (c. 570–632). According to Qissat Shakarwati Farmad, the Masjids at Kodungallur, Kollam, Madayi, Barkur, Mangalore, Kasaragod, Kannur, Dharmadam, Panthalayini, and Chaliyam (just opposite to Kadalundi), were built during the era of Malik Dinar, and they are among the oldest Masjids in the Indian subcontinent. It is believed that Malik Dinar died at Thalangara in Kasaragod town.

After the breakdown of the Chera Kingdom dynasty rooted in Kadalundi, Parappanad Kovilakam became the rulers of Kadalundi. They gave permission for the Dutch to build a fort in Kadalundi. Even though the fort collapsed after a war with Zamorians, we can see the remnants in Mulla in Kadalundi. Later the British became the rulers of Kadalundi and they built railway lines up to Chaliyam for the purpose of business. Later when Calicut became the center of trades the railway lines were removed but there are remnants such as the railway well, lighthouse, and forest depot.

Thundi is an ancient seaport and harbor-town north of Muziris (Muchiri) in the Chera Kingdom (Keprobotos), modern day India on the Malabar Coast. The exact location of the port is still unknown, modern day Kadalundi, Ponnani, Tanur, and Pantalayani Kollam are often identified as Tyndis located in the Sangam age Tamil kingdom of the Cheras. Tyndis was a major center of trade, next only to Muziris, between the Cheras and the Roman Empire in the early centuries of the Christian era. A branch of the Chera royal family is also said to have established itself at Tyndis. It is also speculated that Tyndis (along with ports such as Naura, Bakare and Nelkynda) operated as a satellite feeding port to Muziris.

Kadalundi was the site of the Kadalundi train derailment, which was one of the biggest accidents on the Indian railway network in 2001.

=== Political history ===
Kadalundi, on the southern bank of Chaliyar river and the northern bank of Kadalundi River, was a part the kingdom of Parappanad during medieval period. The rulers of Parappanad were vassals to the Zamorin of Calicut. The headquarters of Parappanad Royal family was the coastal town of Parappanangadi in present-day Malappuram district. In the 15th century CE, Parappanad Swaroopam was divided into two - Northern Parappanad (Beypore Swaroopam) and Southern Parappanad (Parappur Swaroopam). Kadalundi, Vallikkunnu, and Parappanangadi, were included in Southern Parappanad. Beypore, Cheruvannur, and Panniyankara, on northern bank of Chaliyar, became Northern Parappanad.

It is also known the ruler of the Kingdom of Tanur (Vettathunadu Swaroopam), had assisted the Portuguese to build a fort at the island of Chaliyam, which was a part of Southern Parappanad, and was destructed during the Battle at Chaliyam fort occurred in 1571. Feroke became a part of the Kingdom of Mysore in the late 18th century CE. Following the Third Anglo-Mysore War and the subsequent Treaty of Seringapatam, Kadalundi became a part of Malabar District under British Raj. Kadalundi was included in Eranad Taluk in the Malappuram Revenue Division of Malabar District with its Taluk headquarters at Manjeri. Following the formation of the state of Kerala in 1956, Kadalundi became a part of Tirurangadi Revenue block of Tirur Taluk. On 16 June 1969, Eranad Taluk, Tirur Taluk, Tirurangadi, and Parappanangadi, were transferred to newly formed Malappuram district. However, three Revenue Villages of Tirur Taluk, namely, Feroke, Ramanattukara, and Kadalundi, remained in Kozhikode district, as they were much closer to Kozhikode city centre. However Kadalundi Nagaram beach (where Kadalundi River flows into Arabian Sea, a part of Vallikkunnu Grama Panchayat), Tenhipalam, the centre of University of Calicut, and Karippur, the site of Calicut International Airport, became parts of Malappuram. Now Feroke, Ramanattukara, and Kadalundi are parts of Kozhikode Taluk and Kozhikode metropolitan area

== Demographics ==
Kadalundi panchayat population
Year	Pop.	±%
1961	12,287	—
1971	15,555	+26.6%
1981	29,988	+92.8%
1991	35,171	+17.3%
2001	39,099	+11.2%
2011	42,516	+8.7%
Source: Census of India

== Gallery ==
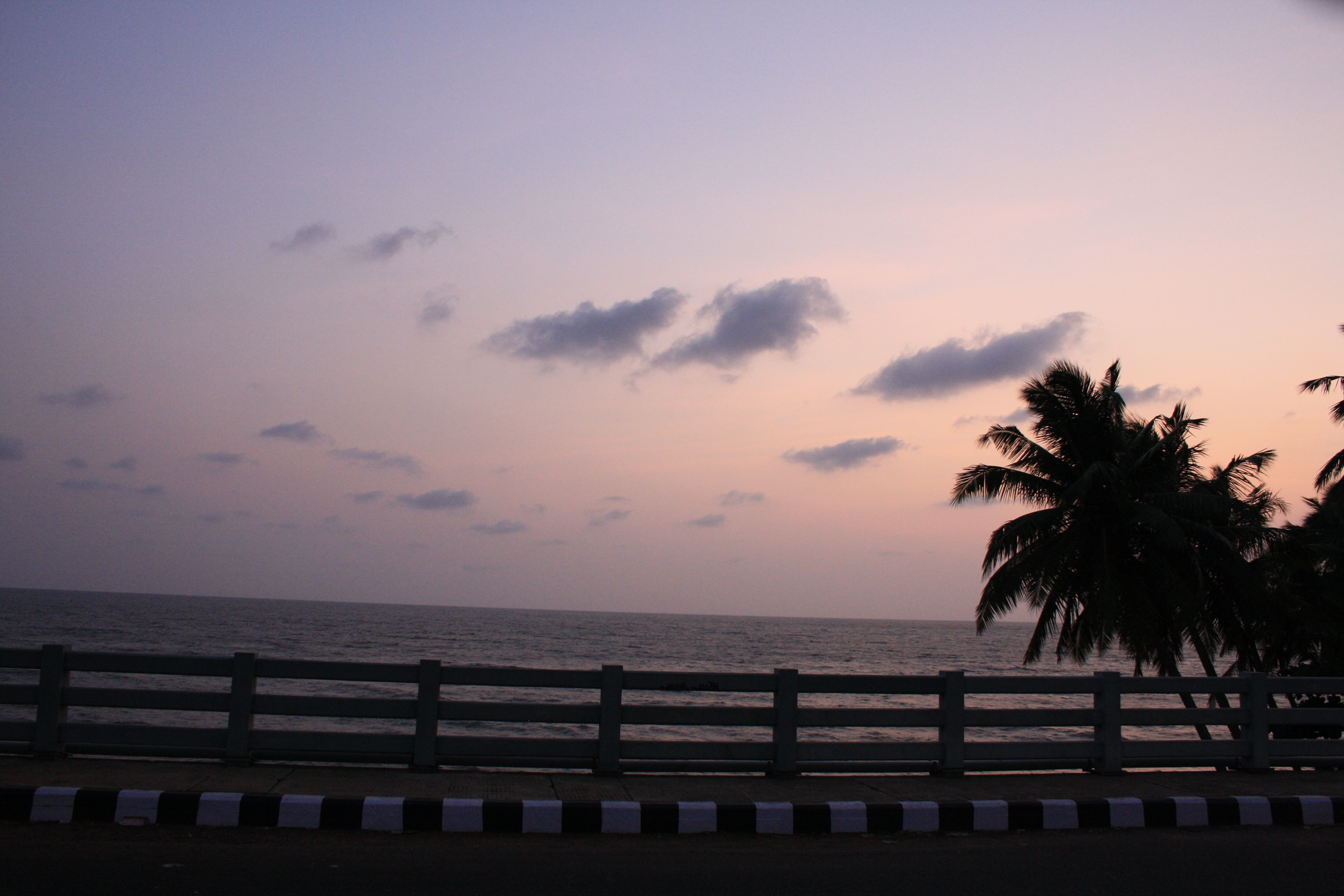
View from Kadalundi bridge

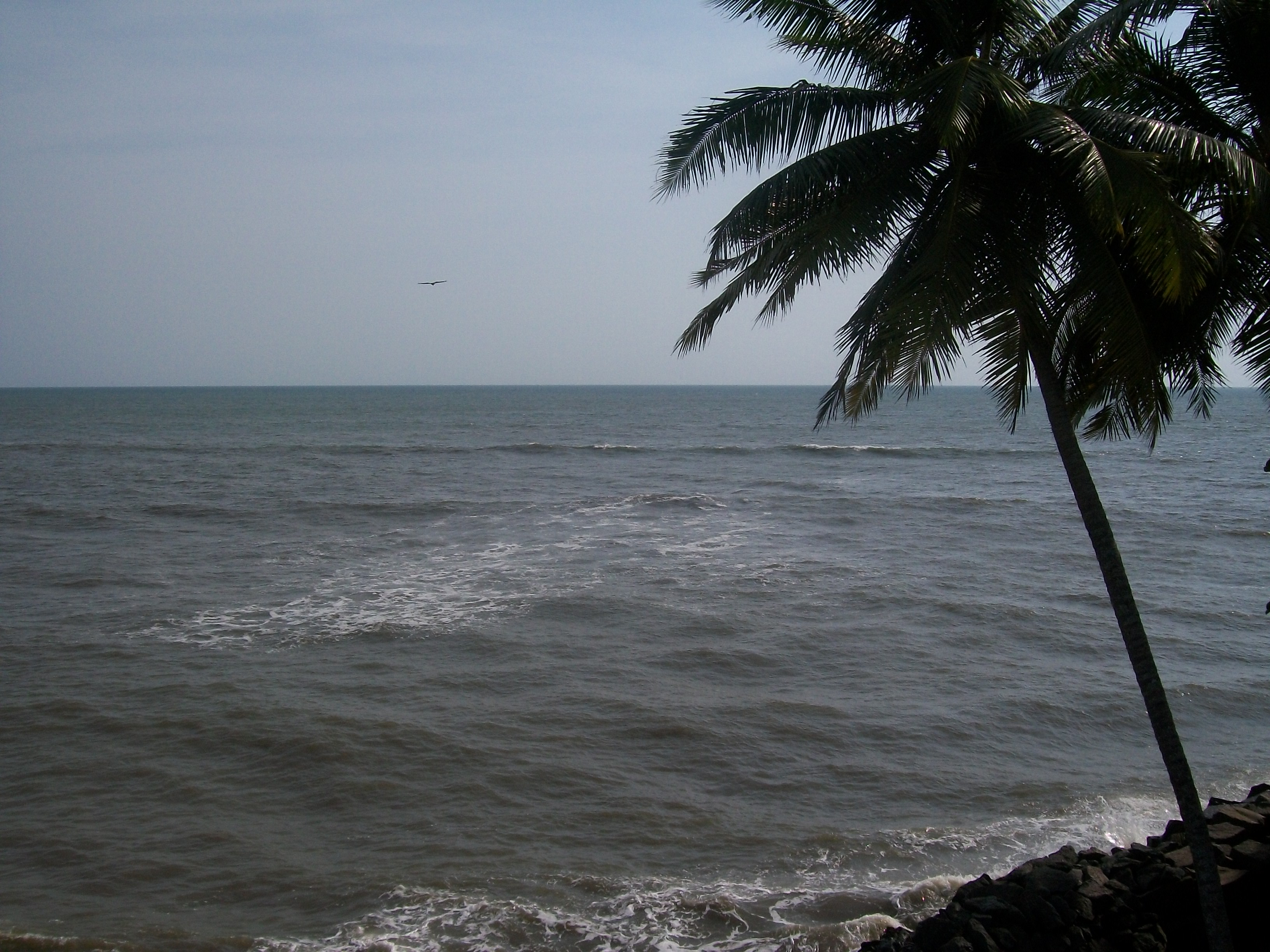
