= West Chathalloor =

- Village
- Location in Kerala, India West Chathalloor (India)
- Coordinates: 11.2427254°N 76.1162827°E
- Country: India
- State: Kerala
- District: Malappuram

Population
  - Total: 2,600

Languages
  - Official: Malayalam,
- Time zone: UTC+5:30 (IST)
- PIN: 676541
- Telephone code: 0483

West Chathalloor is a small village at Edavanna Grama Panchayat, Malappuram district of Kerala, India. Three sides of the village are surrounded by the hills and the other side is river Chaliyar which is the fourth longest river in Kerala.

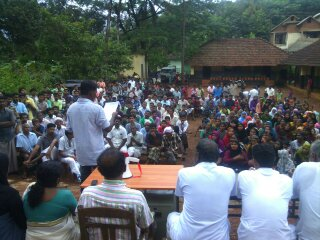
Grama Sabha Against Quarry

== Culture ==
West Chathalloor village is a predominantly Muslim populated area. Hindus exist in comparatively smaller numbers. So the culture of the locality is based upon Muslim traditions. Kolkali is a common folk art of this locality. There are many libraries attached to streets giving a rich source of art studies. Most of the books are written in Malayalam and English. People gather in mosques for the evening prayer and continue to sit there after the prayers discussing social and cultural issues. Business and family issues are also sorted out during these evening meetings. The Hindu minority of this area keeps their rich traditions by celebrating various festivals in their temples. Hindu rituals are done here with a regular devotion like other parts of Kerala.

== Quarry strike ==
Chathalloor faced 2 major historic strikes against the quarry Mafia. Youths were the leaders of these two strikes. Most of the village participated in the strike. These 2 strikes failed to achieve their aim but it converted the villagers into a unit. Moreover, it gave a big message to upcoming citizens.

== Transportation ==
West Chathalloor village connects to other parts of India through Nilambur town. State Highway No.28 starts from Nilambur and connects to Ooty, Mysore and Bangalore through Highways.12,29 and 181. National highway No.66 passes through Ramanattukara and the northern stretch connects to Goa and Mumbai. The southern stretch connects to Cochin and Trivandrum State. The nearest airport is Kozhikode Airport. The nearest major railway station is at Feroke.
