= Kadalundi train derailment =

2001 railway accident in Kadalundi, India

Kadalundi train disaster

Details
- Date: 22 June 2001
- Location: Bridge 924, kadalundi, kozhikode district, Kerala, India
- Coordinates: 11°07′43″N 75°49′53″E
- Country: India
- Line: Mangalore-Shoranur line
- Operator: Indian Railways
- Incident type: Derailment
- Cause: Bridge collapse

Statistics
- Trains: 1 Mangaluru–Chennai Mail
- Vehicles: diesel locomotive class WDM-2
- Deaths: 59
- Injured: 241

The Kadalundi train disaster occurred in India on 22 June 2001, when the Mangalore-Chennai Mail passenger train was crossing over the Kadalundi river. Three carriages fell into the water, with 59 people reported killed or missing, and up to 300 believed injured. The official inquiry concluded that the derailment was caused by one pillar of the 140-year old bridge sinking into the riverbed, following recent heavy rain, though this finding has been challenged.

== Derailment ==
The Mangalore-Chennai Mail passenger train heading for Chennai was crossing Bridge 924 over the Kadalundi river, connecting Malappuram and Kozhikode districts when six carriages derailed and three fell into the river.

The death toll rose steadily as bodies were retrieved from the wreckage over the course of a week, 59 people were eventually reported as dead or missing, including at least eight women and two children, whilst between 117 and 300 were injured and transported to nearby hospitals. These figures were still challenged by some, who said the toll was higher and that a number of people were still missing. It was one of India’s biggest rail crashes in 2001.

The monsoon rains had been normal that year. Officials said that heavy rainfall in the 24 hours before the crash could have contributed to the problems on the bridge. The bridge failed as the heavy train passed over them. The bridge was 140 years old and in a poor state of repair, and it shifted when the line broke, derailing six cars of the train. Three carriages fell into the swollen river.

Rescue parties of over 500 people from nearby towns entered the river to rescue people from the wrecked carriages. Support was also received from fire brigades and the Indian Navy, who sent fifty professional divers to attempt to rescue those trapped in the underwater railway cars. Railway officials and family members also arrived rapidly with the aid of a special train.

== Inquiry ==
The inquiry into what actually caused the damage to the bridge was highly controversial, because government investigators concluded that one of the bridge's pillars had sunk into the river, causing an uneven kink in the track, which snapped when the train hit it. Subsequent private investigations have challenged this theory, pointing out that the bridge is damaged on top of the structure in a way which would not be possible if the pillar was unstable. These investigators claim that there was a fault with the train itself or that there were a combination of causes behind the derailment.

== Similar incidents aka See Also ==
- (New Zealand) - Tangiwai disaster - lahar undermines bridge.
- (India) - Veligonda train disaster
- (India) - Perumon train disaster
