= Chelari =

Chelari Mele Chelari Thazhe Chelari
- Census town
- Interactive map of Chelari
- Coordinates: 11.107720°N 75.890427°E
- Country: India
- State: Kerala
- District: Malappuram

Government
  - Body: Gram panchayat

Population (2001)
  - Total: 10,483

Languages
  - Official: Malayalam, English
- Time zone: UTC+5:30 (IST)
- PIN: 673 637
- Lok Sabha constituency: Malappuram
- Vidhan Sabha constituency: Vallikkunnu

Chelari, also known as Mele Chelari (upper side) and Thazhe Chelari (lower side), is a census-designated town in Tenhipalam panchayat, Tirurangadi taluk in Malappuram district of Kerala, India. It has a population of 19,483 as of the 2001 census. Chelari formed a portion of the Malappuram metropolitan area as of 2011 Census. Chelari Airport is the first airport in the Malabar region. It is the commercial center of Tenhipalam panchayat.

== Geography ==
Chelari Town is in the north-west of Malappuram district, about 35 km away from district headquarters Malappuram, and 11 km north of Taluk headquarters Tirurangadi. It shares its borders with Chelembra panchayat to the north, Pallikkal and Peruvalloor panchayats to the east, and Kadalundi River separates Vallikkunnu panchayat in the west. The southern border is against Mooniyoor panchayat. It is located 24 km south of Kozhikode on the Mangalore–Edapally National Highway 66.

== Mele Chelari and Thazhe Chelari ==
Locally, Chelari is divided into Mele Chelari (upper side) and Thazhe Chelari (lower side), also known as East Chelari and West Chelari. The two areas are divided by the national highway. The road from Mele Chelari goes through Alungal, Chenakkalangadi, Pallippuraya, Nechinathil, Kolathode and terminates at Irumbothingal Kadavu.

== Transport ==
Chelari has good road access to the rest of Kerala. National Highway 66 passes through Tenhipalam, bisecting Chelari. All rural localities in the panchayat are well connected to the arterial National Highway by good quality roads. Minibuses operate from rural areas to nearby small towns such as Chemmad, and Kondotty. Private buses operate between Thrissur and Kozhikode. Kerala State Road Transport Corporation buses, which operate between Kozhikode and various southern towns and cities in Kerala also stop at the university en route to Tenhipalam. There are seven towns and one corporation in the 35 km circle around Thenhipalam.

The nearest railway stations are Vallikkunnu (station code VLI), Parappanangadi, and Feroke, which are located 10 km (6.2 mi) west, 12 km (7.5 mi) southwest and 16 km (9.9 mi) northwest respectively from the centre of Chelari. The major railway station of Kozhikode is located 20 km (12 mi) away.

Calicut International Airport at Karipur is located 10 km (6.2 mi) east of Chelari.

=== Chelari Airport ===
Chelari Airport was an airstrip built in 1962 in Chelari, then owned by the Birla group corporation, which used this airport for traveling to their factory in Calicut.

== Education ==
Chelari is also known for being home to the head office of the Samastha Kerala Islam matha Vidyabhysaa Board, which is sometimes referred to as Chelari Samastha. The Board has more than 10,000 madrassas (schools) throughout the world.

St Paul's English medium Higher Secondary School-Kohinoor is located in Thenhipalam.

The main campus of the University of Calicut is located near Chelarim with a Government Model Higher Secondary School within the university campus. A Government Vocational Higher Secondary School is also active within at Chelari which provides vocational education in addition to Higher Secondary Education.

== Notable people ==
- Anees Nadodi Actor.

== Notable events ==
- On 17 January 1969, A Douglas C-47A VT-DTH cargo plane crashed at the Chelari Airport.

== See also ==
- Chelari Airport
