= Mudikkode (Malappuram) =

Coordinates: 11.0854°N 76.1303°E

- town
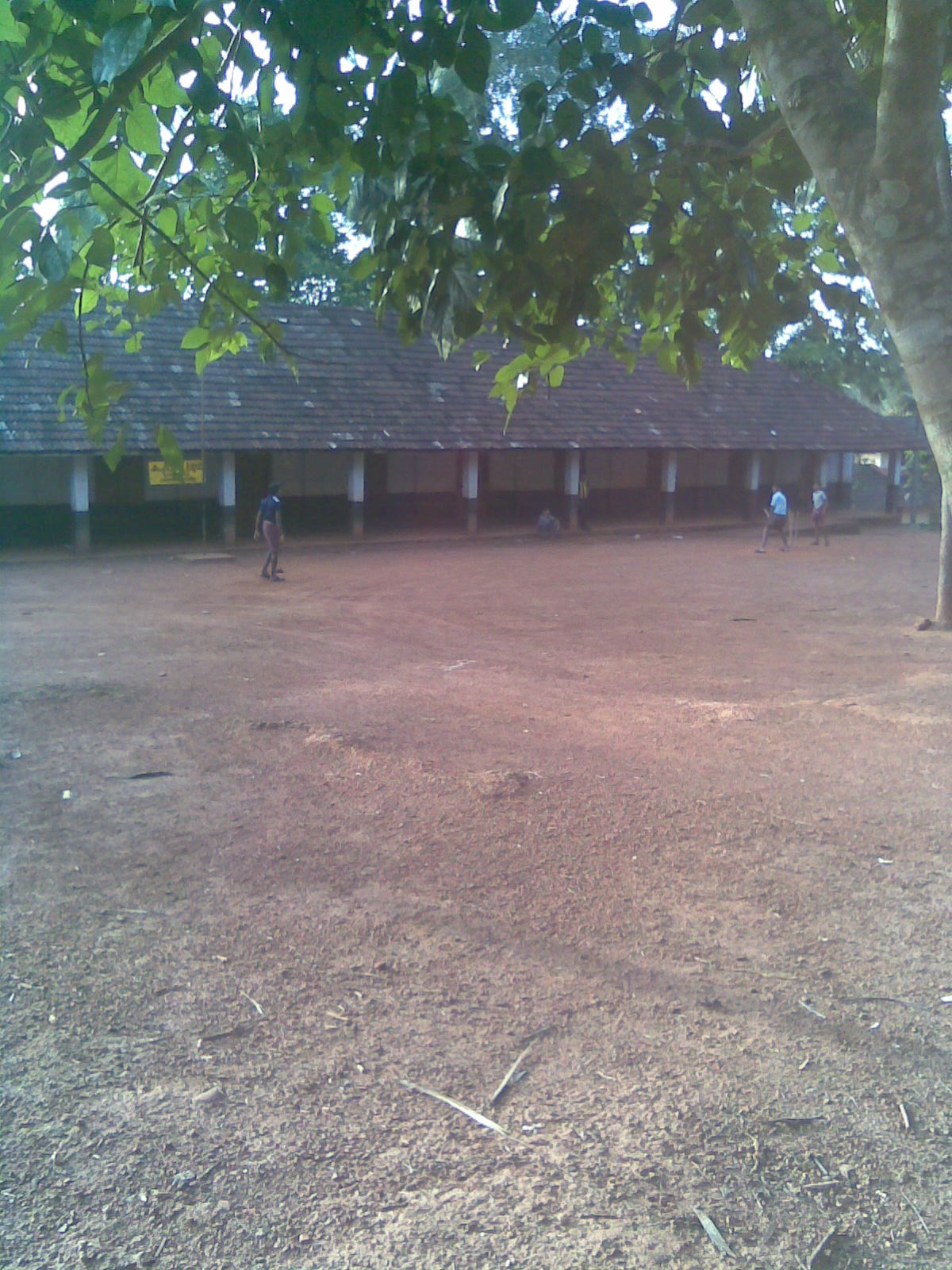
- Mudikkode panchayath office
- Interactive map of Mudikkode
- Country: India
- State: Kerala
- District: Malappuram

Languages
  - Official: Malayalam, English
- Time zone: UTC+5:30 (IST)
- PIN: 676521
- Telephone code: 0483
- Vehicle registration: KL-10
- Nearest city: Pandikkad
- Lok Sabha constituency: Malappuram
- Climate: Tropical monsoon (Köppen)
- Avg. summer temperature: 35 °C (95 °F)
- Avg. winter temperature: 20 °C (68 °F)

Mudikkode is a small village located in the Malappuram district in the state of Kerala. It is situated in Anakkayam Panchayath. Mudikkode is 17 km from the district headquarters of Malappuram. Nearby cities are Manjeri (10 km) and Pandikkad (6 km). The Kadalundi river is a presence in the village. Agriculture is a major source of income. Mudikkode is unique in Kerala for its diverse mix of religions; 95 percent of Mudikkode residents are Muslims and the remaining 5 percent are Hindus.

== Satellite view ==
click here for satellite view

== Culture ==
Mudikkode village is a predominantly Muslim populated area. Hindus exist in comparatively smaller numbers. So the culture of the locality is based upon Muslim traditions. Duff Muttu, Kolkali and Aravanamuttu are common folk arts of this locality. There are many libraries attached to mosques giving a rich source of Islamic studies. Most of the books are written in Arabi-Malayalam which is a version of the Malayalam language written in Arabic script. People gather in mosques for the evening prayer and continue to sit there after the prayers discussing social and cultural issues. Business and family issues are also sorted out during these evening meetings. The Hindu minority of this area keeps their rich traditions by celebrating various festivals in their temples. Hindu rituals are done here with a regular devotion like other parts of Kerala.

== Transportation ==
Mudikode village connects to other parts of India through Manjeri town. National highway No.66 passes through Parappanangadi and the northern stretch connects to Goa and Mumbai. The southern stretch connects to Cochin and Trivandrum. National Highway No.966 connects to Palakkad and Coimbatore. The nearest airport is at Kozhikode. The nearest major railway station is at Tirur.
