= Ariyallur =

- Census town
- Location in Kerala, India Ariyallur (India)
- Coordinates: 11.4974200°N 75.7199600°E
- Country: India
- State: Kerala
- District: Malappuram

Population (2011)
  - Total: 22,558

Languages
  - Official: Malayalam, English
- Time zone: UTC+5:30 (IST)
- PIN: 676312
- Vehicle registration: KL-65

Ariyallur is a census town in Malappuram district in the state of Kerala, India. It is situated in Vallikkunnu Gramapanchayath and newly formed Vallikkunnu Legislative Assembly constituency.

== Demographics ==
As of 2011 India census, Ariyallur had a population of 22558 with 10,826 males and 11,732 females. Hindus form the majority.

== Transportation ==
The nearest airport is at Karipur Airport. The nearest major railway station is at Vallikkunnu.

== Places of interest ==
Ariyallur is home to Vallikkunnu Railway Station. M V Higher Secondary School and G U P School are important schools. Ariyallur is also famous for agricultural nurseries. It has a coast of about 4 Kilometers. Muthiyam Turtle Sanctuary is on this coast.
