= Tenhipalam =

Thenhipalam Thenjipalam, Tenhipalam
- Census town
- Thenhipalam
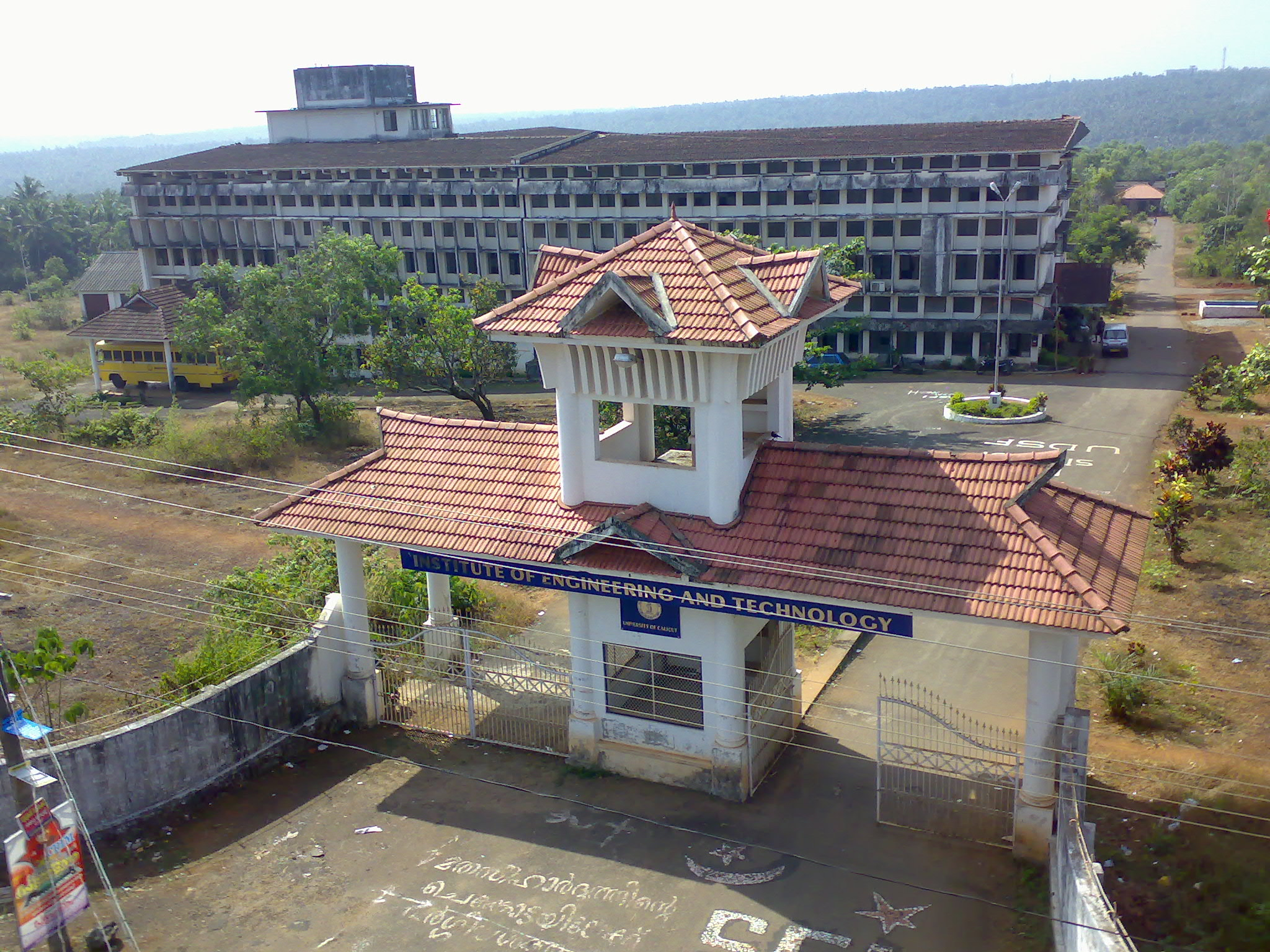
- CUIET
- Interactive map of Thenhipalam
- Coordinates: 11°7′34″N 75°53′25″E
- Country: India
- State: Kerala
- District: Malappuram

Government
  - Body: Gram panchayat

Population (2001)
  - Total: 27,273

Languages
  - Official: Malayalam, English
- Time zone: UTC+5:30 (IST)
- PIN: 673 636
- Lok Sabha constituency: Malappuram
- Vidhan Sabha constituency: Vallikkunnu

Thenhipalam (also spelt Tenhipalam and Thenjipalam) is a census town and a panchayat in Tirurangadi taluk in Malappuram district of Kerala, India, with a population of 27,273 as per 2001 census, consisting of 13,293 males and 13,980 females. Tenhipalam forms a portion of the Malappuram metropolitan area as of 2011 Census. University of Calicut, the first university in the Malabar region, is located north-west part of the Panchayat. 'Chelari' is the main commercial place in Tenhipalam panchayat while 'Panambra' is considered the headquarters of the panchayat. The small town between Chelari and the university is called Kohinoor.

== Geography ==
Tenhipalam panchayat is situated in the north-west region of Malappuram district, about 35 km away from district headquarters Malappuram and 11 km north of Taluk headquarters Tirurangadi. It shares its borders with Chelembra panchayat in north, Pallikkal and Peruvalloor panchayats in east, Kadalundi River separates Vallikkunnu panchayat in west. In Southern side it shares border with Mooniyoor panchayat. It is located 24 km south of Kozhikode on the Mangalore–Edapally national highway 17.

== Transport ==
Tenhipalam is well connected with all parts of Kerala by road. National Highway 17 passes through Tenhipalam. All rural localities in the panchayat are well connected to the arterial national highway by good quality roads. Minibuses operate from rural areas to nearest small towns such as Chemmad, Feroke, Kondotty and Kottakadavu. Private buses operate between Thrissur and Kozhikode call at the University of Calicut. Kerala State Road Transport Corporation buses, which operate between Kozhikode and various southern towns and cities in Kerala also have stop at the university on route to Tenhipalam. There are seven towns and one corporation in the 30 km circle around Thenhipalam.

The nearest railway stations are Vallikkunnu (station code VLI), Parappanangadi and Feroke, which are located 8.8 km (5.5 mi) west, 12 km (7.5 mi) southwest and 14 km (8.7 mi) northwest respectively from the centre of Tenhipalam. The major railway station of Kozhikode is located 24 km (15 mi) away.

Calicut International Airport at Karipur is located 12 km (7.5 mi) east of Tenhipalam.

== Education ==
The main campus of the University of Calicut is located in Thenjipalam. Government Model Higher Secondary School is functioning inside Calicut University Campus. A Government Vocational Higher Secondary School is also functioning at Chelari which imparts vocational education in addition to Higher Secondary Education. Chelari is also known for head office of the Samastha Kerala Islam matha Vidyabhysaa Board, which is sometimes called as Chelari Samastha. It has more than 10,000 madrassas throughout the world. St Paul’s English medium Higher Secondary School-Kohinoor also located in Thenhipalam.

== Suburbs of Tenhipalam ==
- Idimuzhikkal and Kakkanchery
- Chelembra, Kinfra and Chettiar Madu
- Kohinoor, Parambil Bazar and Devathiyal
- Saddham Nagar and Neerolpalam
- Neerolpalam, Ambalappadi and Saddam Nagar

== Kadakkattupara ==
Kadakkattu Para is a small village included in Tenhippalam panchayath. It is three kilometers west of the Upper Chelari bus stop. The main villages on this route are Shanthi Corner, Alungal, Mukkood and Pichanadathilpady. The important places of worship are Thrakkannoor Shiva Temple, Pichanadathil Masjidh and Kadakkattoor Masjidh. Other important landmarks are AEMS Public School, VEM Public School and Shamsul Hudha Madrassah

== Chenakkalangadi ==
Chenakkalangadi is a small town near branching out from Mele Chelari. The road from Mele Chelari goes through Alungal, Chenakkalangadi, Pallippuraya, Nechinathil, Kolathode and terminates at Irumbothingal Kadavu. The important landmarks in this area are Kunnummal Bhagavathi Kavu, Thrikkannur Siva Skhethra, Cheenikkanari Bagavathi Kshethra, Muhiyadheen Masjid (kizhakke Palli), Padinjare Palli, Thomb of Nossan Thangal Uppappa, Subulul Huda Madrassa Chenakkalangadi, Irumbothingal Madrassa, Areepara Madrassa, Alungal Madrassa, GUP school, AEMS Public School, Chenakkalangadi Masjidh (Srambya), Mathapuzha Srambya, Masjidhul Mujahidheen and Alungal Shariath College for Women. The Y-junction at Chenakkalangadi forks to Kolathode on the right and Mathappuzha river on the left side. The ancient Thrikkannur Shiva temple and Muhyudheen masjid is two km from Mele Chelari on this route.

== Devathiyal ==
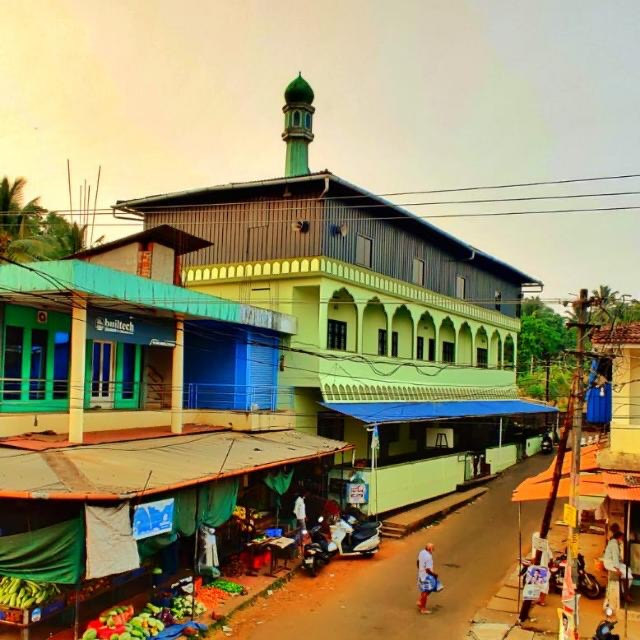
Devathiyal

Devathiyal is a small town near Calicut University Engineering College (IET). Devathiyal town is located 1 kilometer east of Kohinoor on NH-17, on the road from Kohinoor to Calicut International Airport (Karipur). This village was also on a cart route that used to carry goods from the east to Kozhikode in ancient times. The Noorul Islam Madrasa near Muhiyuddin Juma Masjid is located in Devathiyal town; it is also a polling station in the Thenhipalam panchayath. The east side of Devathiyal town is bordered by Pallikkal Panchayath, while the south side is known as Devathiyal Parambu, which belongs to the 7th ward of Tenhipalam Panchayath.

== Panambra ==
Panambra is the administrative headquarters of Tenjipalam Panchayat, Panambra is located between Kohinoor and Chelari on National Highway-17. Tenjipalam Village Office, Panchayat Office, Community Hall, Krishi Bhavan, Public Health Center, Tenjipalam Service Cooperative Bank etc. are all functioning in Panambra, Sri Koyappa Mahavishnu Temple is situated about one kilometer east from here.

== Neerolpalam ==
The eastern part of Tenjipalam Panchayat is bordered by Peruvallur Panchayat with a brook and barrage, and on its western side is the small town of Neerolpalam. This area is relatively densely populated and positioned on the top of a hill, surrounded on three sides by paddy fields. Neerolpalam AMLP School is located 200 meters from Neerolpalam town. It is a polling station in the Thenjhipalam panchayat.

== Notable people ==
- Muhammad Musthafa, Malayalam actor
- Sithara Krishnakumar, playback singer

== Image gallery ==
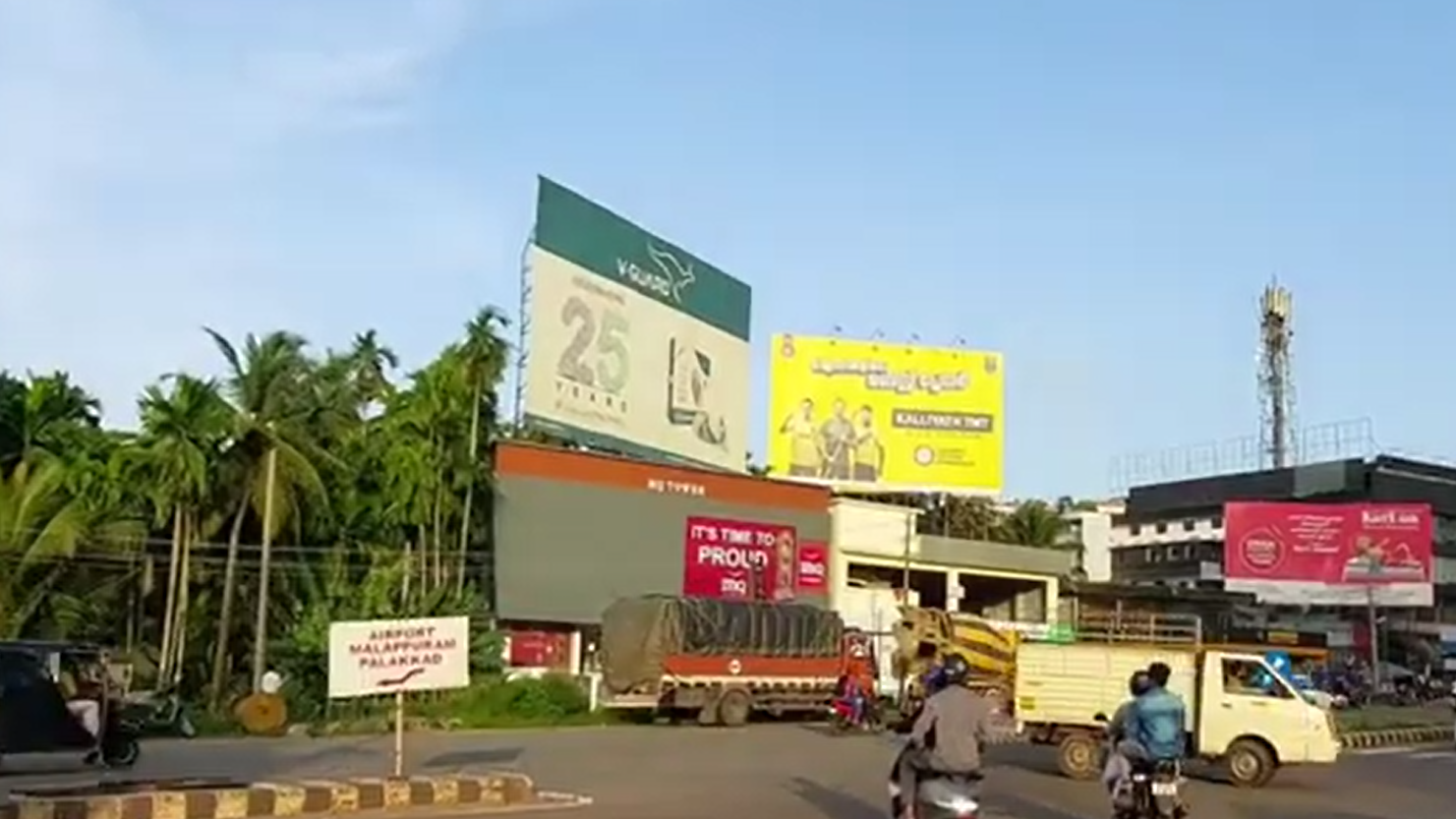
Tenhippalam highway

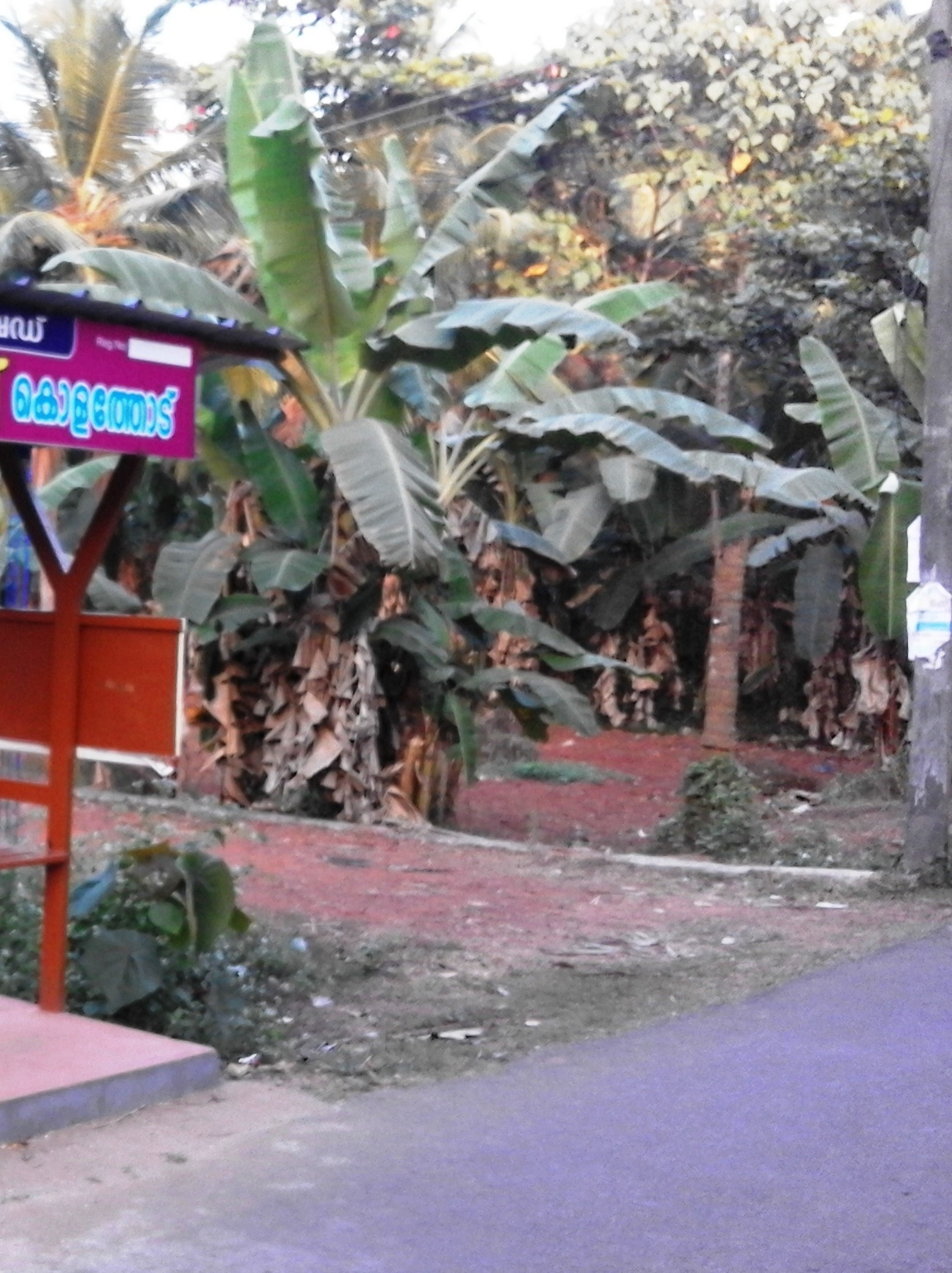
Bus Station at Kolathode, Tenhipalam

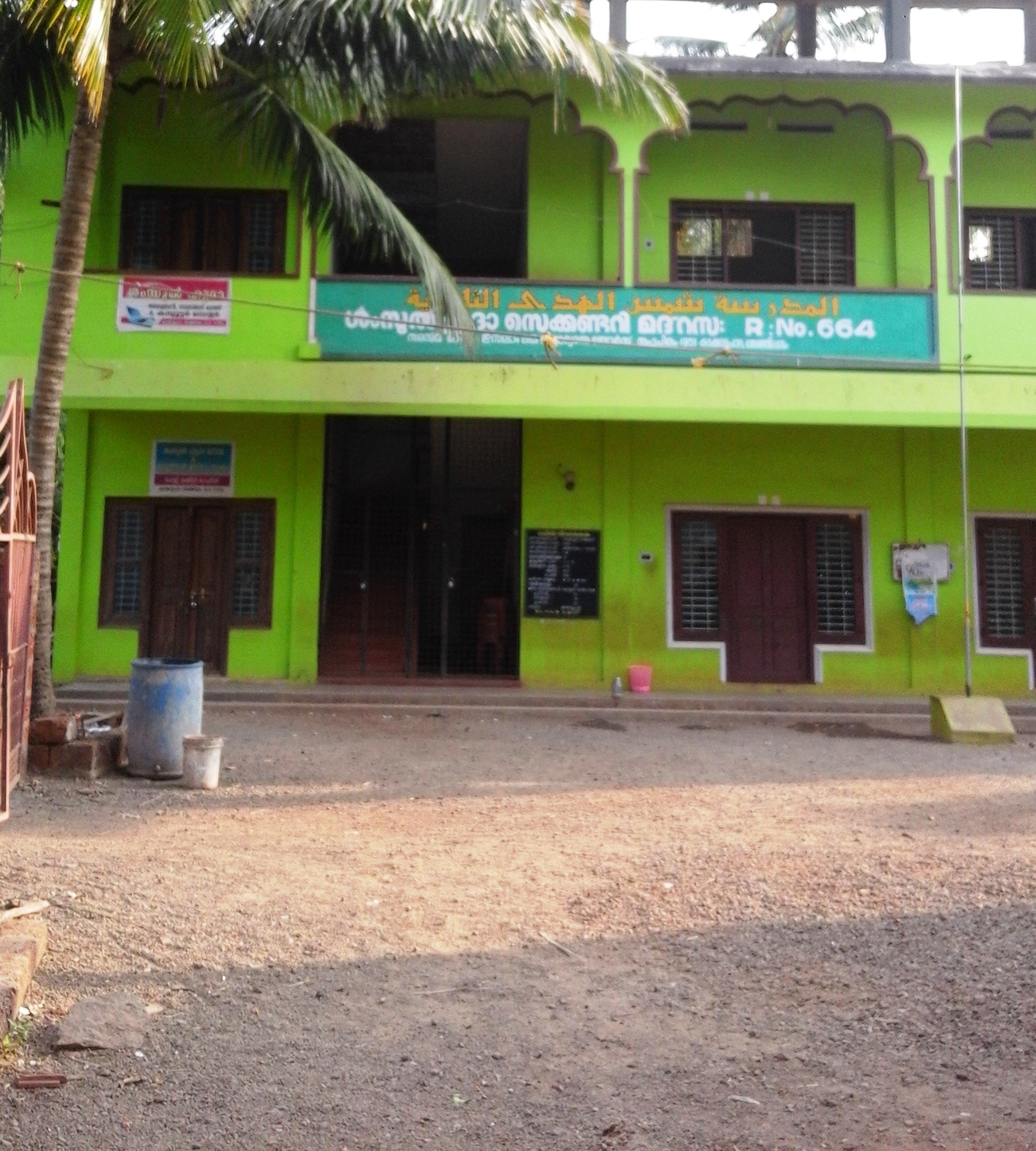
Madrassah at Kadakottpara, Tenhipalam

== See also ==
- Chelembra
- Farook College
- Feroke
- Kadalundi Bird Sanctuary
- Paruthippara
- Ramanattukara
- Vallikkunnu
