= Vallikkunnu =

- Village
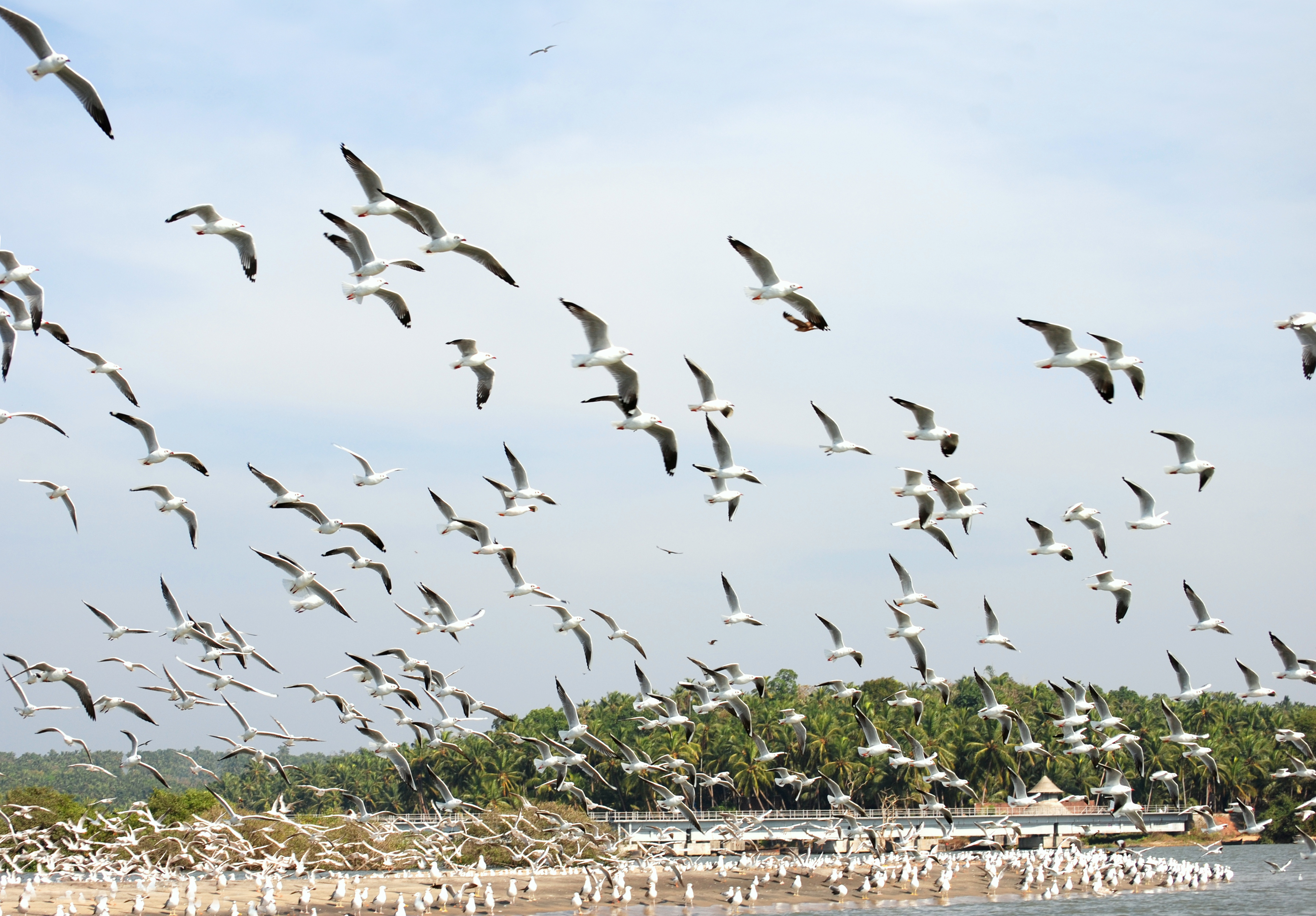
- Kadalundi Bird Sanctuary is located in the Balathiruthi Island clusters of Vallikkunnu

- Location in Kerala, India Vallikkunnu (India)
- Coordinates: 11°8′0″N 75°50′0″E
- Country: India
- State: Kerala
- District: Malappuram
- Elevation: 2 m (6.6 ft)

Population (2011)
  - Total: 25,448

Languages
  - Official: Malayalam, English
- Time zone: UTC+5:30 (IST)
- PIN: 673314
- Telephone code: 0494
- Nearest city: Kozhikode
- Lok Sabha constituency: Malappuram
- Vidhan Sabha constituency: Vallikkunnu
- Climate: Moderate (Köppen)

Vallikkunnu is a village in Tirurangadi taluk of Malappuram district in the state of Kerala, India with an area of 25 km^{2}. It is located 5 km north of Parappanangadi town and falls under the jurisdiction of Parappanangadi Police Station and Parappanangadi Judicial First Class Magistrate Court. Vallikkunnu was awarded the best panchayath of Kerala in 1997. Vallikunnu is situated on Tirur-Kadalundi Road. Vallikkunnu is also a part of the Oldest Railway Line of Kerala laid in 1861 from Tirur to Chaliyam via Tanur, Parappanangadi, Vallikkunnu, and Kadalundi.

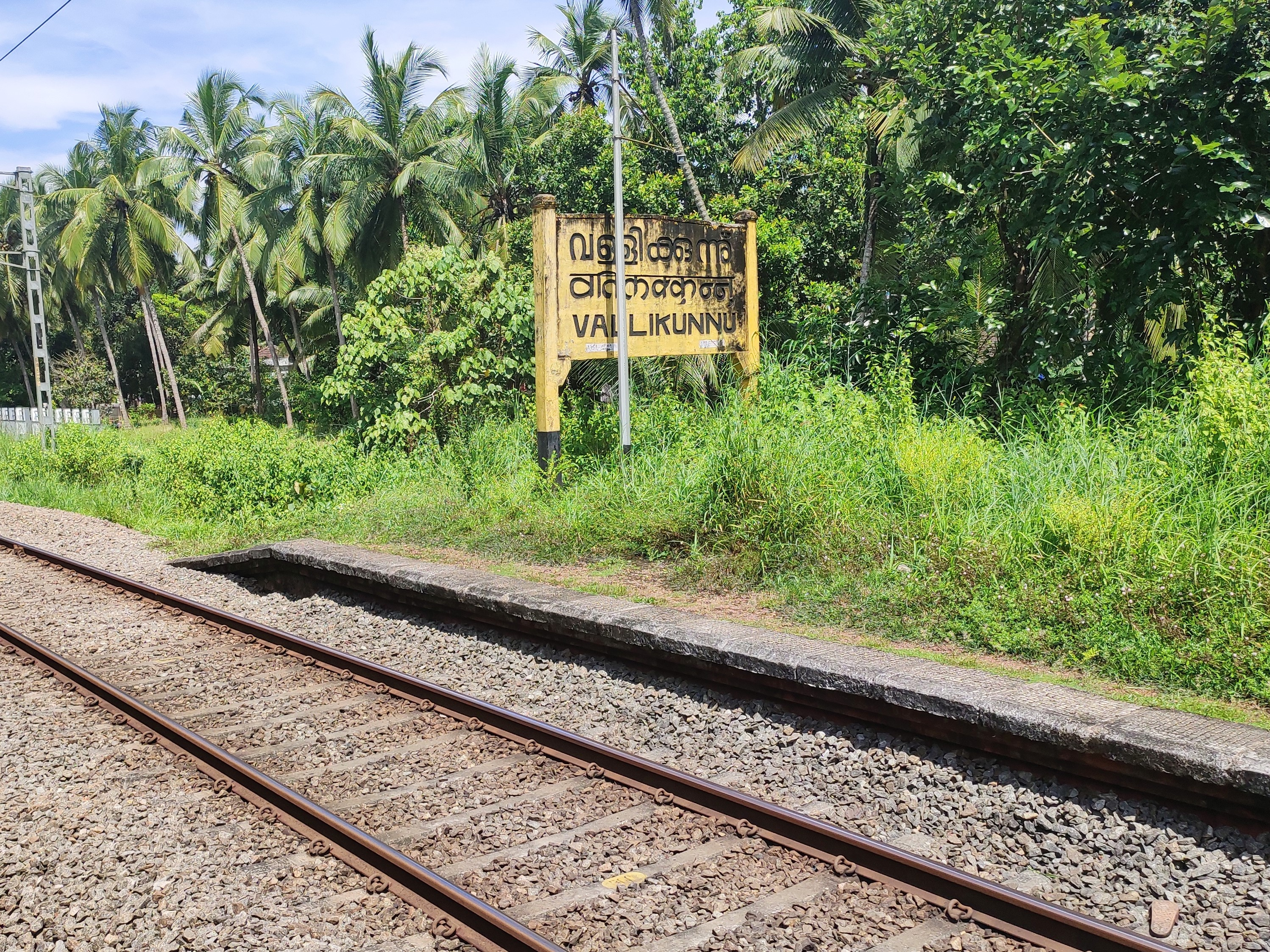
Vallikkunnu railway station

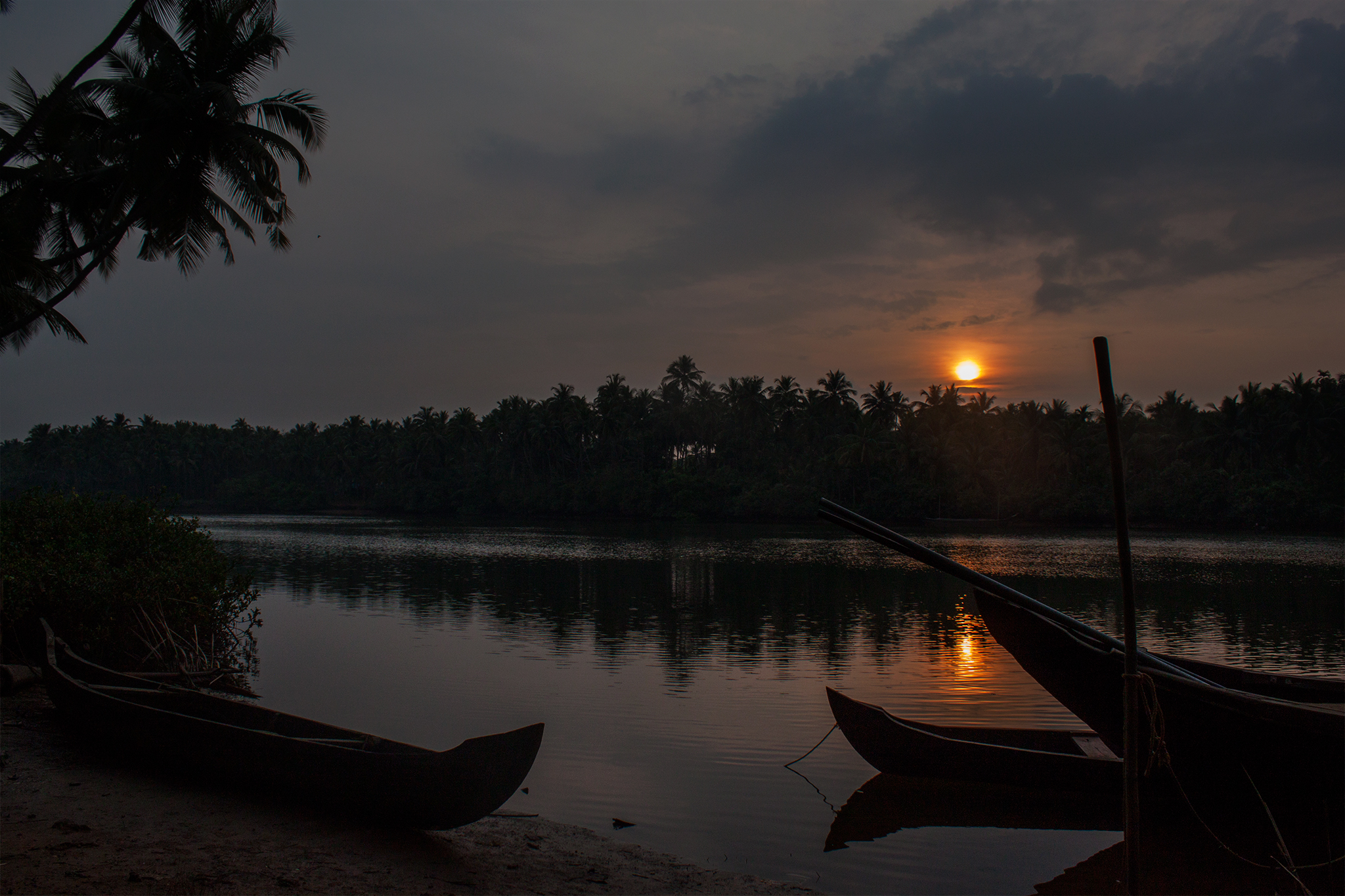
A sunrise at Vallikkunnu

Vallikkunnu lies on the bank of the Kadalundi River. Kadalundi River joins the Arabian Sea at the estuary (Azhimukham) in Kadalundi Nagaram beach of Vallikkunnu grama panchayat. Kadalundi Bird Sanctuary and Kadalundi-Vallikkunnu Community Reserve are located in Vallikkunnu.

== Demographics ==
As of 2011 India census, Vallikkunnu had a population of 25448 with 12019 males and 13429 females. It falls under Thirurangadi thaluk. Its northern boundary is Kadalundi river its southern boundary is with Parappanangadi Municipality. The village has a coastline of 8 kilometers with Arabian Sea in the west. It is bordered by Chelembra, Tenhipalam and Moonniyoor Panchayaths.

== History ==
Names, routes and locations of the Periplus of the Erythraean Sea (1st century CE)

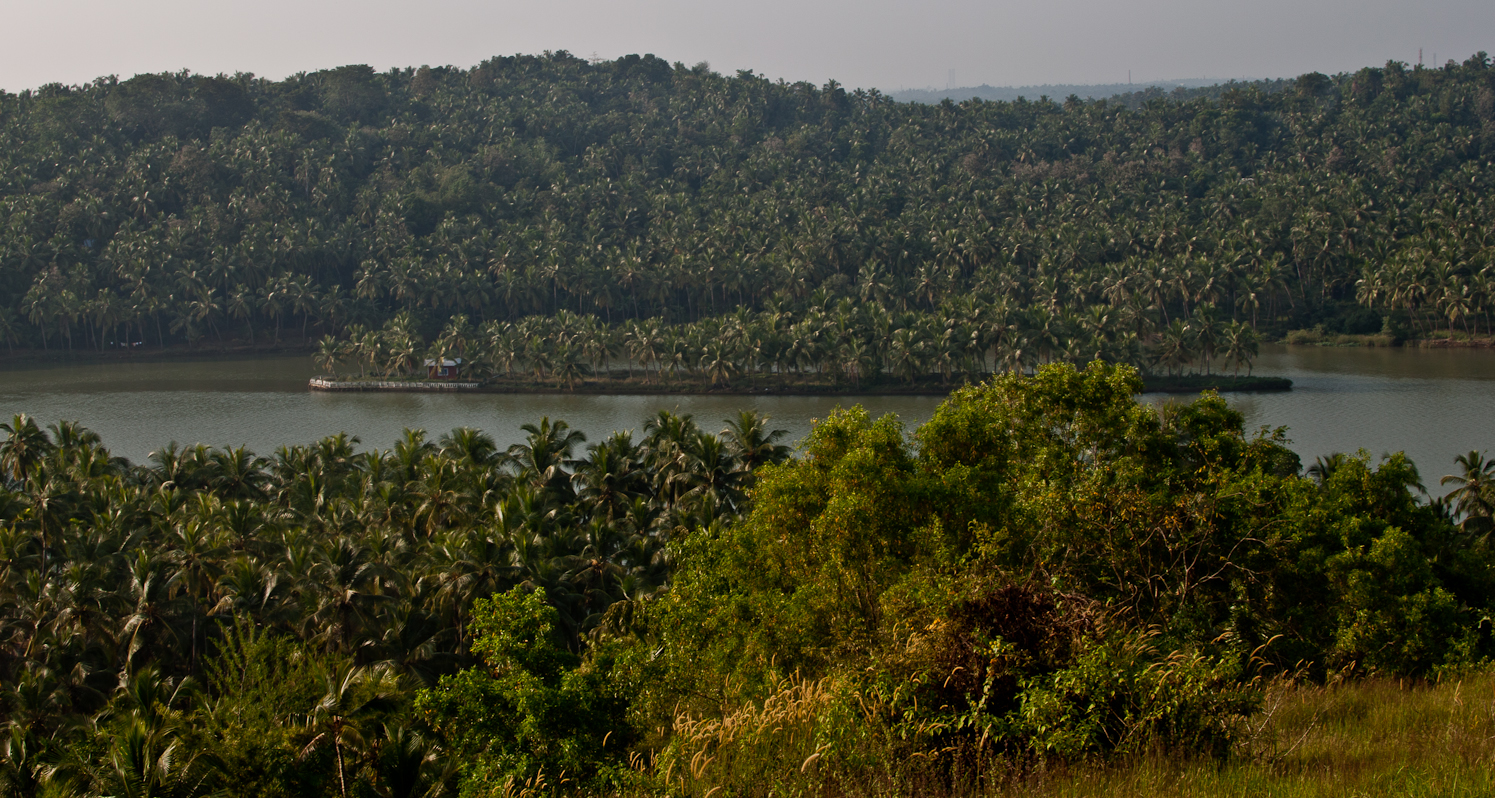
Mangrove plantation at Vallikunnu

Vallikkunnu-Kadalundi-Chaliyam-Beypore had trade relations with foreign countries like Rome and Arabia since the era of king Solomon. Tyndis, which was a major center of trade, next only to Muziris, between the Cheras and the Roman Empire, is identified with Kadalundi. Pliny the Elder (1st century CE) states that the port of Tyndis was located at the northwestern border of Keprobotos (Chera dynasty). The North Malabar region, which lies north of the port at Tyndis, was ruled by the kingdom of Ezhimala during Sangam period. According to the Periplus of the Erythraean Sea, a region known as Limyrike began at Naura and Tyndis. However Ptolemy mentions only Tyndis as the Limyrike's starting point. The region probably ended at Kanyakumari; it thus roughly corresponds to the present-day Malabar Coast. The value of Rome's annual trade with the region was estimated at 50,000,000 sesterces. Pliny the Elder mentioned that Limyrike was prone by pirates. The Cosmas Indicopleustes mentioned that the Limyrike was a source of peppers.

According to the Legend of Cheraman Perumals, the first Indian mosque was built in 624 AD at Kodungallur with the mandate of the last the ruler (the Cheraman Perumal) of Chera dynasty, who converted to Islam during the lifetime of Muhammad (c. 570–632). According to Qissat Shakarwati Farmad, the Masjids at Kodungallur, Kollam, Madayi, Barkur, Mangalore, Kasaragod, Kannur, Dharmadam, Panthalayini, and Chaliyam (just opposite to Vallikkunnu), were built during the era of Malik Dinar, and they are among the oldest Masjids in the Indian subcontinent. It is believed that Malik Dinar died at Thalangara in Kasaragod town.

After the breakdown of the Chera Kingdom dynasty rooted in Kadalundi, Parappanad Kovilakam of Parappanangadi became the rulers of Vallikkunnu. Parappanad royal family is a cousin dynasty of the Travancore royal family. They gave permission for the Dutch to build a fort at Kadalundi. Even though the fort collapsed after a war with Zamorins, we can see the remnants in Mulla. Later the British became the rulers of Vallikkunnu and they built railway lines from Tirur up to Chaliyam for the purpose of business. Later it was extended to Shoranur. Marthanda Varma, the founder of Travancore, belongs to Parappanad royal family.

Thundi is an ancient seaport and harbor-town north of Muziris (Muchiri) in the Chera Kingdom (Keprobotos), modern day India on the Malabar Coast. The exact location of the port is still unknown, modernday Kadalundi Nagaram, Ponnani, Tanur, and Pantalayani Kollam are often identified as Tyndis located in the Sangam age Tamil kingdom of the Cheras. Tyndis was a major center of trade, next only to Muziris, between the Cheras and the Roman Empire in the early centuries of the Christian era. A branch of the Chera royal family is also said to have established itself at Tyndis. It is also speculated that Tyndis (along with ports such as Naura, Bakare and Nelkynda) operated as a satellite feeding port to Muziris.

Temples

Vallikkunnu has several temples including Ravimngalam Vishnu temple and Nirankaitha Kotta. The annual Thalappoli Utsavam is one of the major religious festivals in this region, usually celebrated in the months of Feb-March.

== Wards of Vallikkunnu ==
Vallikkunnu Grama Panchayat

Vallikkunnu Grama Panchayat is composed of the following 23 wards:

Ward no.	Name	Ward no.	Name
1	Kadalundi Nagaram North	2	Keezhayil
3	Navajeevan	4	Balathiruthi
5	Anayarangadi	6	Madathil Purayi
7	Kizhakkemala	8	Olipram
9	Paruthikkad	10	Pottenkuzhi
11	Kacherikunnu	12	Karumarakkad
13	Kodakkad East	14	Kodakkad South
15	Kodakkad West	16	Ariyallur East
17	Madhavanandam	18	Ariyallur South
19	Ariyallur Beach	20	Ariyallur North
21	Anangadi South	22	Anangadi
23	Kadalundi Nagaram		

== See also ==
- Parappanangadi
- Chelari
- Tenhipalam
- Chelembra
- Kadalundi Bird Sanctuary
- Kadalundi–Vallikkunnu Community Reserve
- Chaliyar
