= Limyrike =

Place in India

Possible extreme points of Limyrike in present-day India

Limyrikê is a historical region of present-day India, mentioned in the ancient Greco-Roman texts. It generally corresponds to the present-day Malabar Coast of Kerala.

== Extent ==
According to the Periplus of the Erythraean Sea (53:17:15-27), Limyrike began at Naura and Tyndis; Ptolemy (7.1.8) mentions only Tyndis as its starting point. The region probably ended at Kanyakumari; it thus roughly corresponds to the present-day Malabar Coast.

== History ==
Pliny the Elder mentioned that this region was prone to pirates. Cosmas Indicopleustes mentioned that it was a source of peppers.

== Misidentification as Damirice ==
Tabula Peutingeriana, an ancient Roman map uses the name "Damirice" to describe an area between the Himalayas and the Ganges River, and uses the name "Dymirice" to describe a region somewhat close to the Malabar Coast.

Assuming possible phonetic connection between the words "Damir-" and "Tamil" (the language of Limyrikê), some modern scholars have wrongly used the term "Damirice" (or "Damirica") to describe Limyrikê. Wilfred Harvey Schoff's 1912 translation of the Periplus wrongly uses the term "Damirica" instead of "Limyrikê", because of which the error has been reproduced by several scholars relying on this faulty translation. Actually, the "Damirice" of Tabula Peutingeriana is over a thousand miles from Limyrikê.
