= Kadalundi Bird Sanctuary =

Coordinates: 11.131°N 75.829°E

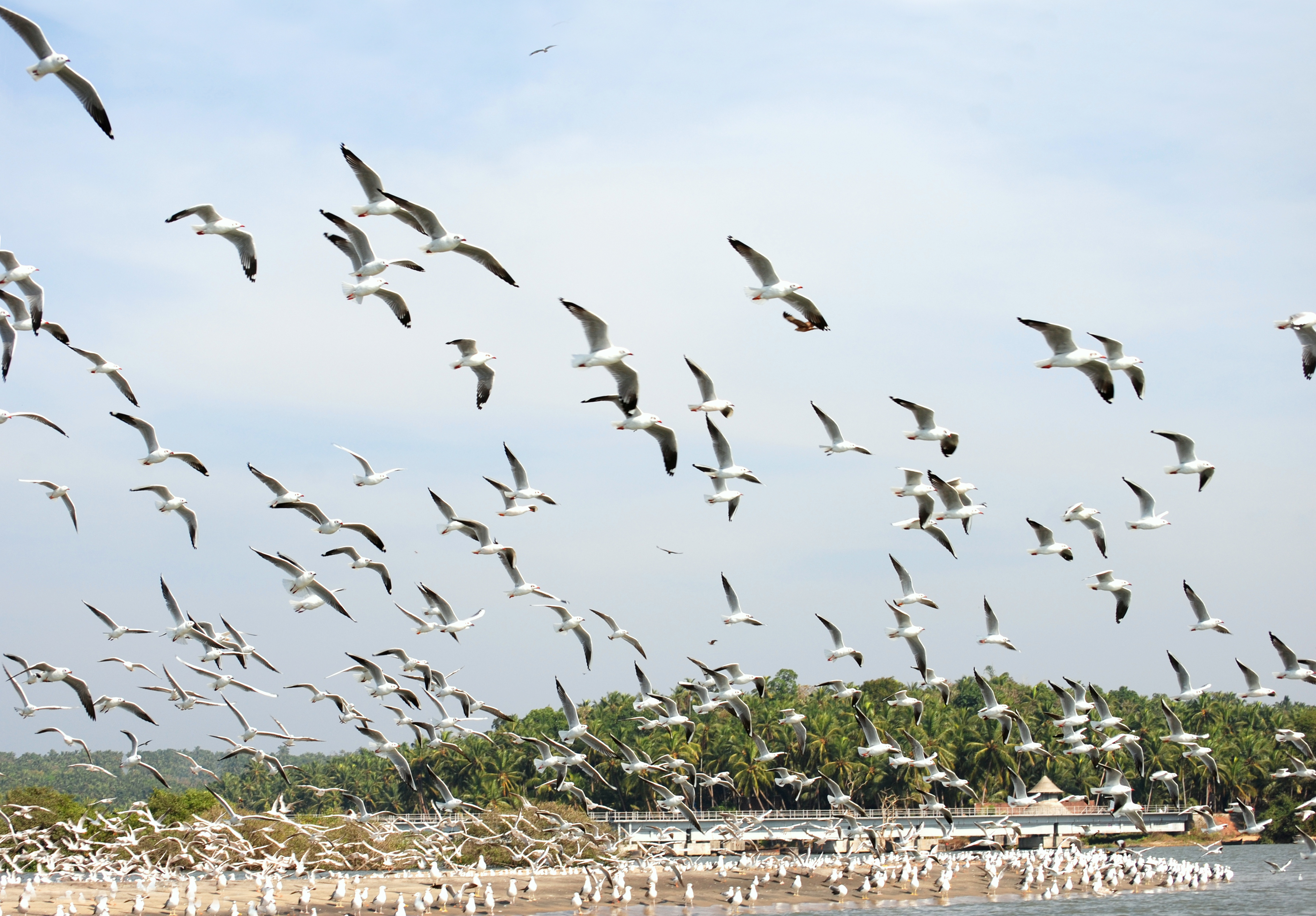
- Kadalundi Bird Sanctuary
- Interactive map of Kadalundi Bird Sanctuary
- Location: kozhikode and Vallikunnu, Malappuram, Kerala, India
- Total height: 200 metres (660 ft)

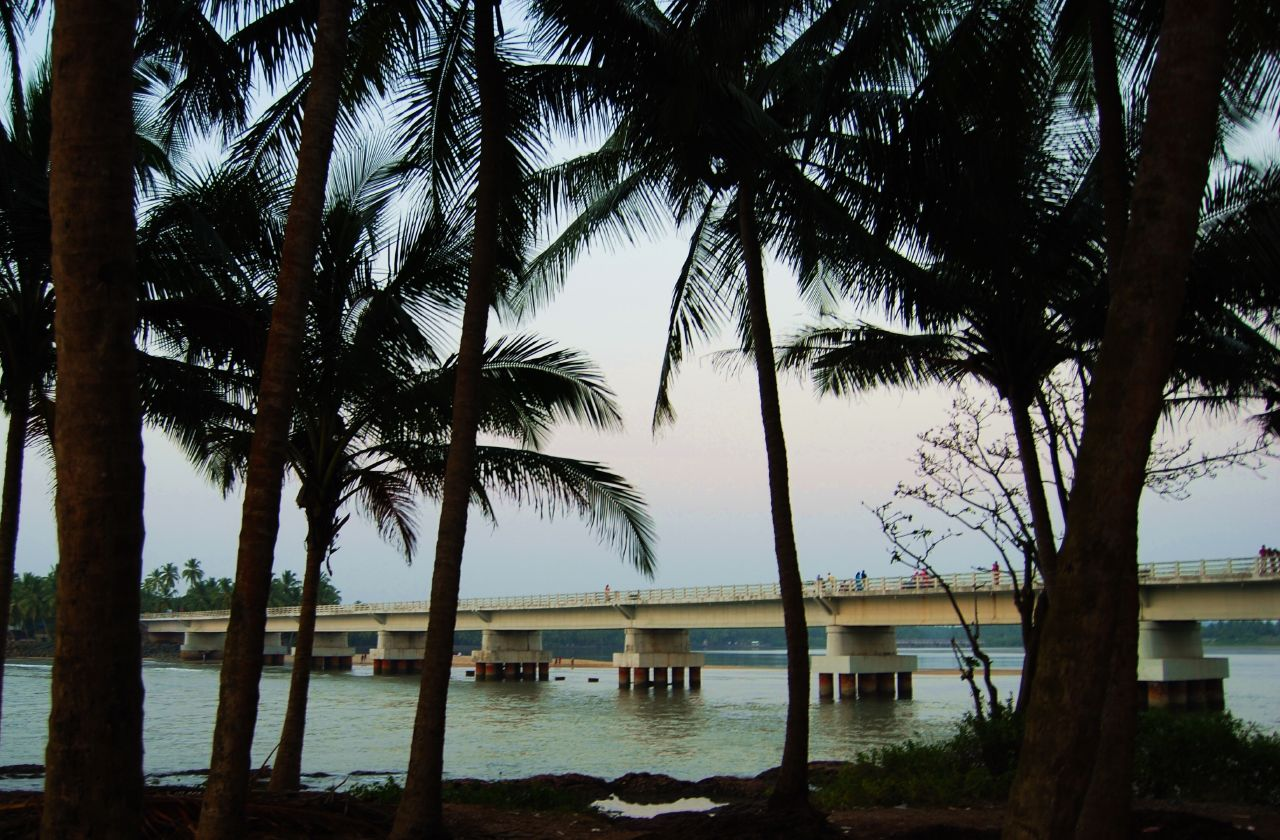
Kadalundi Bridge

The Kadalundi Bird Sanctuary lies in Kadalundi grama panchayat of Kozhikode district and Vallikkunnu Grama Panchayat of Malappuram district in Kerala, India. It spreads over a cluster of islands where the Kadalundi River flows into the Arabian Sea. The Sanctuary hill is around 200 metres (660 ft) above sea level. It is located 19 kilometres (12 mi) away from the Kozhikode city centre.

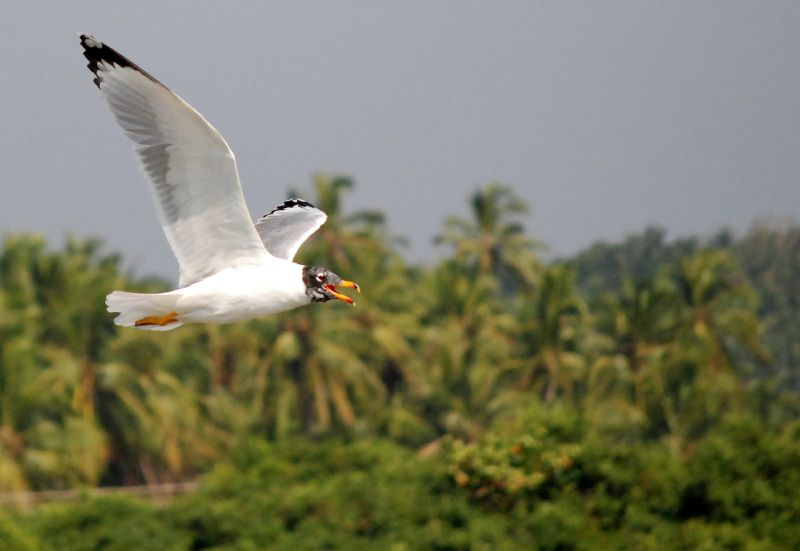
Ichthyaetus ichthyaetus

== Fauna ==
Over a hundred species of native birds have been recorded in the sanctuary, including about 60 species of migratory birds which visit seasonally; these include terns, gulls, herons, sandpipers and cormorants. Notable species are whimbrels and brahminy kites. The sanctuary is well known for a wide variety of fish, mussels and crabs. Some species of snakes, cobras, vipers and kraits also live here.

== See also ==
- Vallikkunnu
- Malappuram district
- Eranad
- Parappanangadi
- Chaliyar river
- Kadalundi river
