= Kadalundi River =

River in Kerala, India

Kadalundi
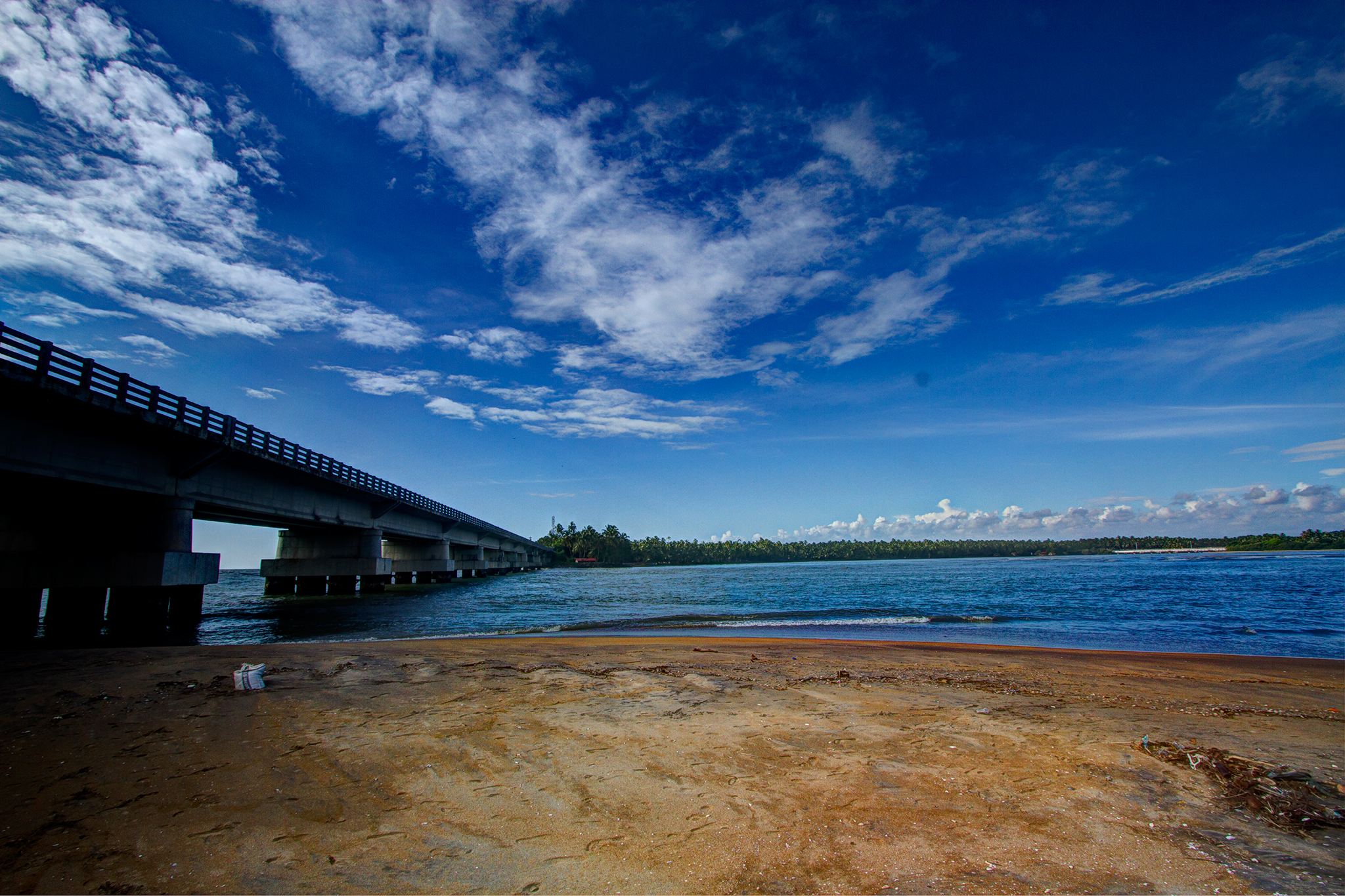
- Kadalundi bridge

Location
- Country: India
- State: Kerala
- Districts: Palakkad, Malappuram

Physical characteristics
- Source: Cherakomban Mala
  - location: Kerala, India
  - coordinates: 11°08′N 76°28′E
  - elevation: 1,160 m (3,810 ft)
- Mouth: Arabian Sea
  - location: Kerala, India
  - coordinates: 11°07′N 75°49′E
  - elevation: 0 m (0 ft)
- Length: 130 km (81 mi)
- Basin size: 1,122 km^{2} (433 sq mi)
- Discharge
  - location: mouth
  - average: 36 m^{3}/s (1,300 cu ft/s)

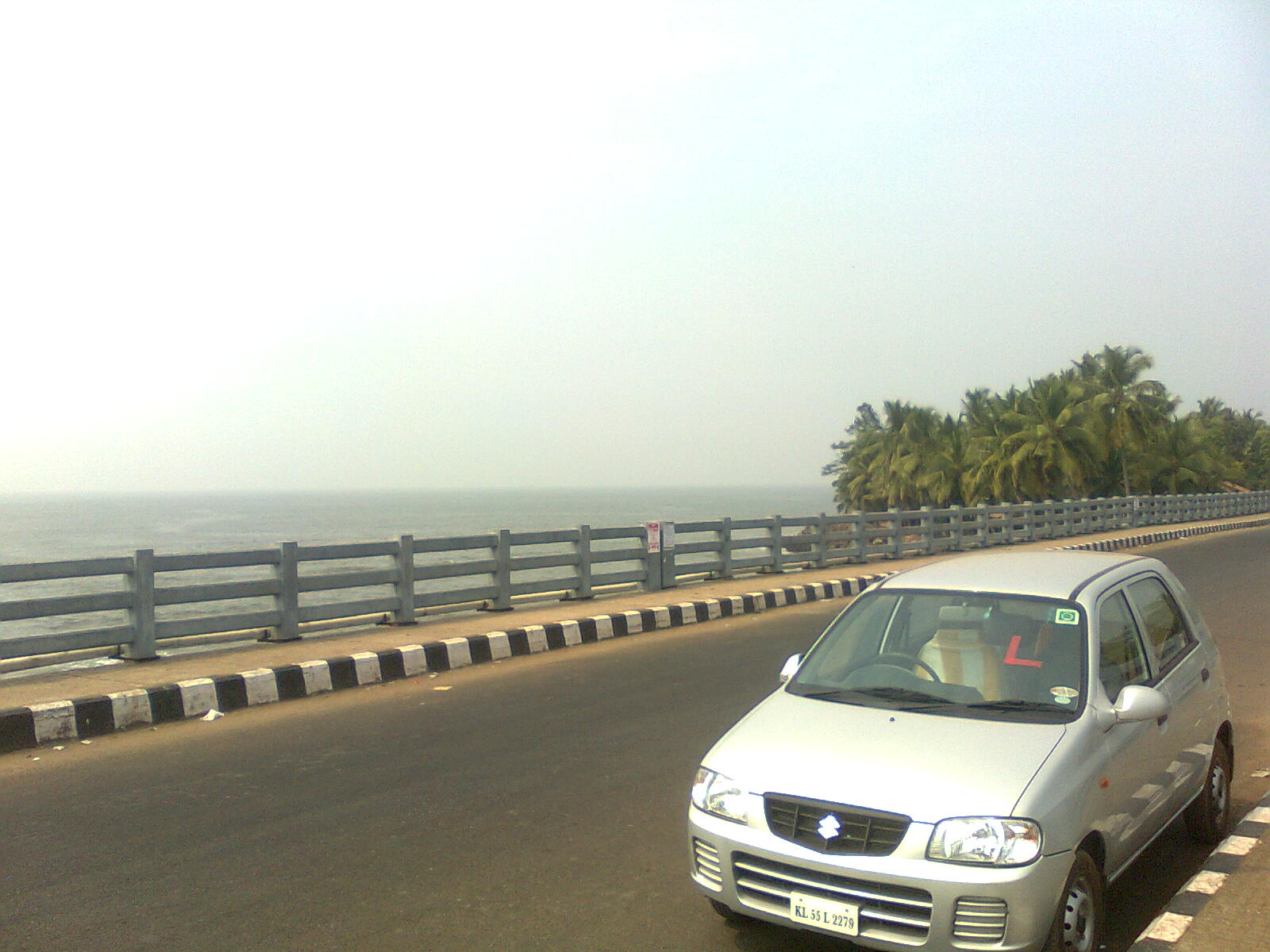
Kadalundi Kadavu Bridge over Kadalundi River

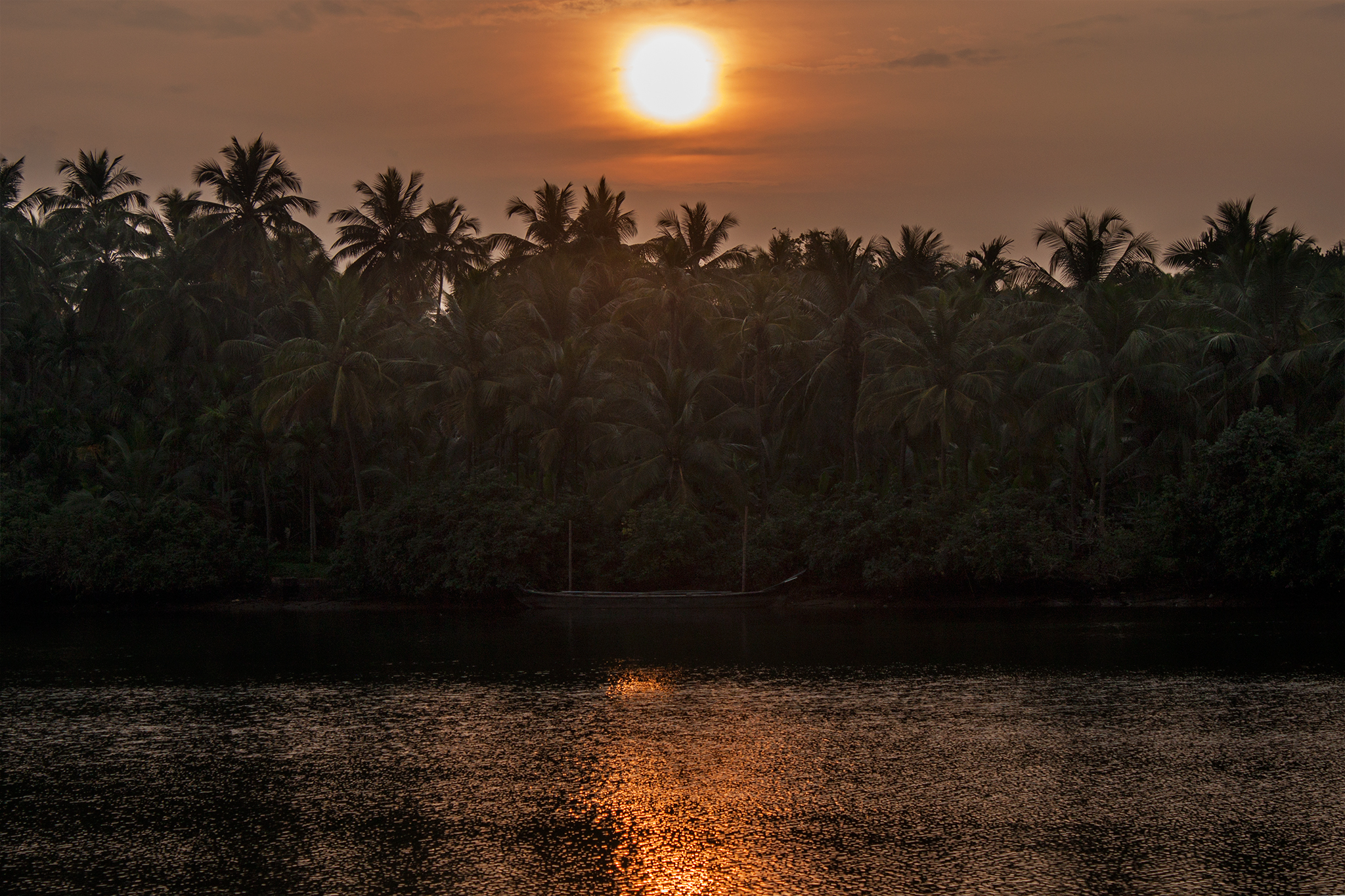
Kadalundi River at Malappuram

Kadalundi River (Kadalundipuzha) is one of the four major rivers flowing through Malappuram district in the Indian state of Kerala. The other three are the Chaliyar, the Bharathappuzha and the Tirur River. This rain-fed river is 130 kilometres (81 mi) long and one of the most important rivers in the district. Kadalundi River is also the sixth longest river in Kerala. Kadalundi River passes through Karuvarakundu, Tuvvur, Melattur, Pandikkad, Manjeri, Malappuram, Panakkad, Parappur, Vengara, Tirurangadi, Parappanangadi, Vallikkunnu, and empties itself into Arabian sea at Kadalundi Nagaram in Vallikkunnu on the northwestern border of the district. It is formed by the confluence of the Olippuzha River and the Veliyar River. The Kadalundi originates from the Western Ghats at the western border of the Silent Valley and flows through the district of Palakkad and Malappuram. It has two main tributaries namely Olipuzha and Veliyar. Olipuzha and Veliyar merges together to become Kadalundi River near Melattur. Kadalundi River traverses through the historical regions of Eranad and Valluvanad. The Kadalundi River drains an area of 1274 km^{2} and has a length of 120 km. The ancient port of Tyndis, which was the second-largest trading port of Chera dynasty, only after to Muziris, is identified with the mouth of this river at Vallikunnu. The Kadalundi Bird Sanctuary spreads over a cluster of islands where the Kadalundipuzha River flows into the Arabian Sea. There are over a hundred species of native birds and around 60 species of migratory birds in large numbers annually.

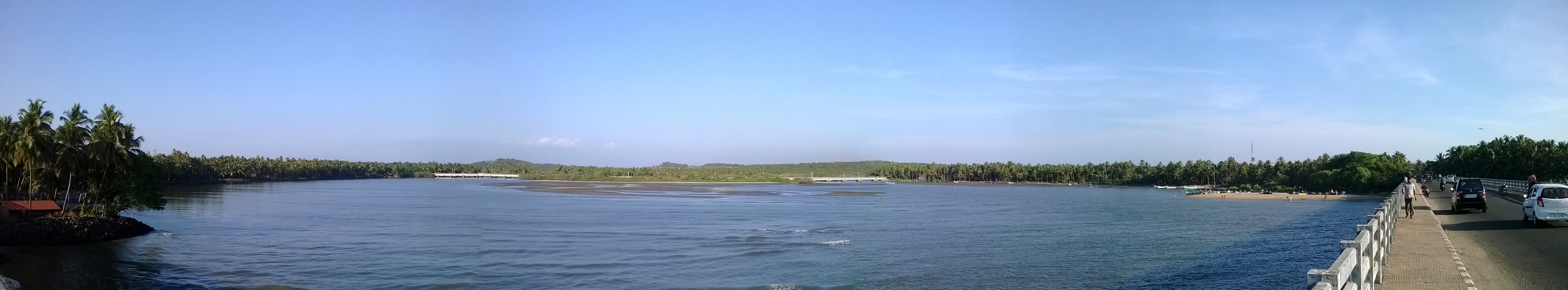
Panoramic View of Kadalundi River

== Cultural significance ==
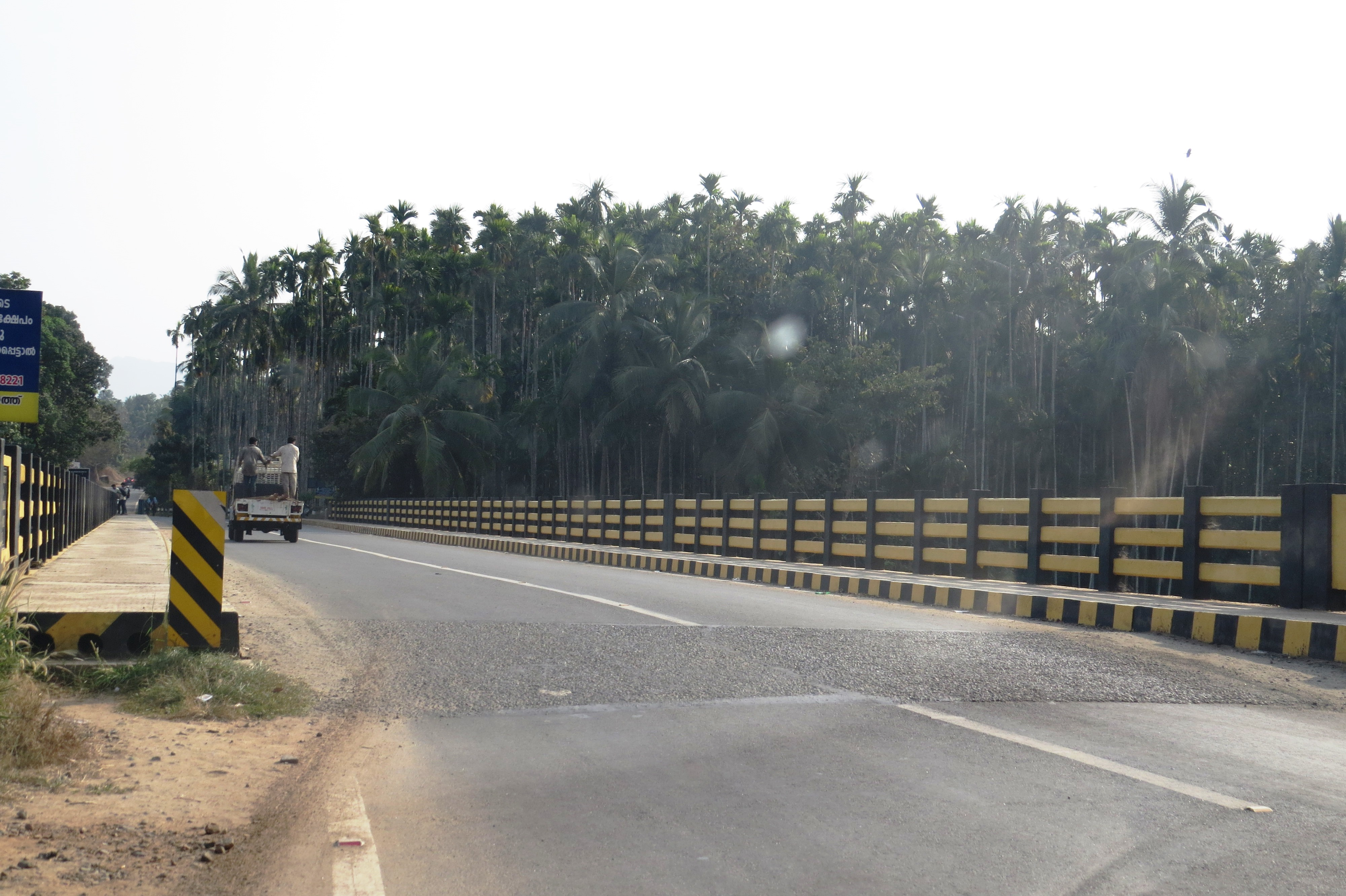
Melattur Bridge over Kadalundippuzha at Melattur

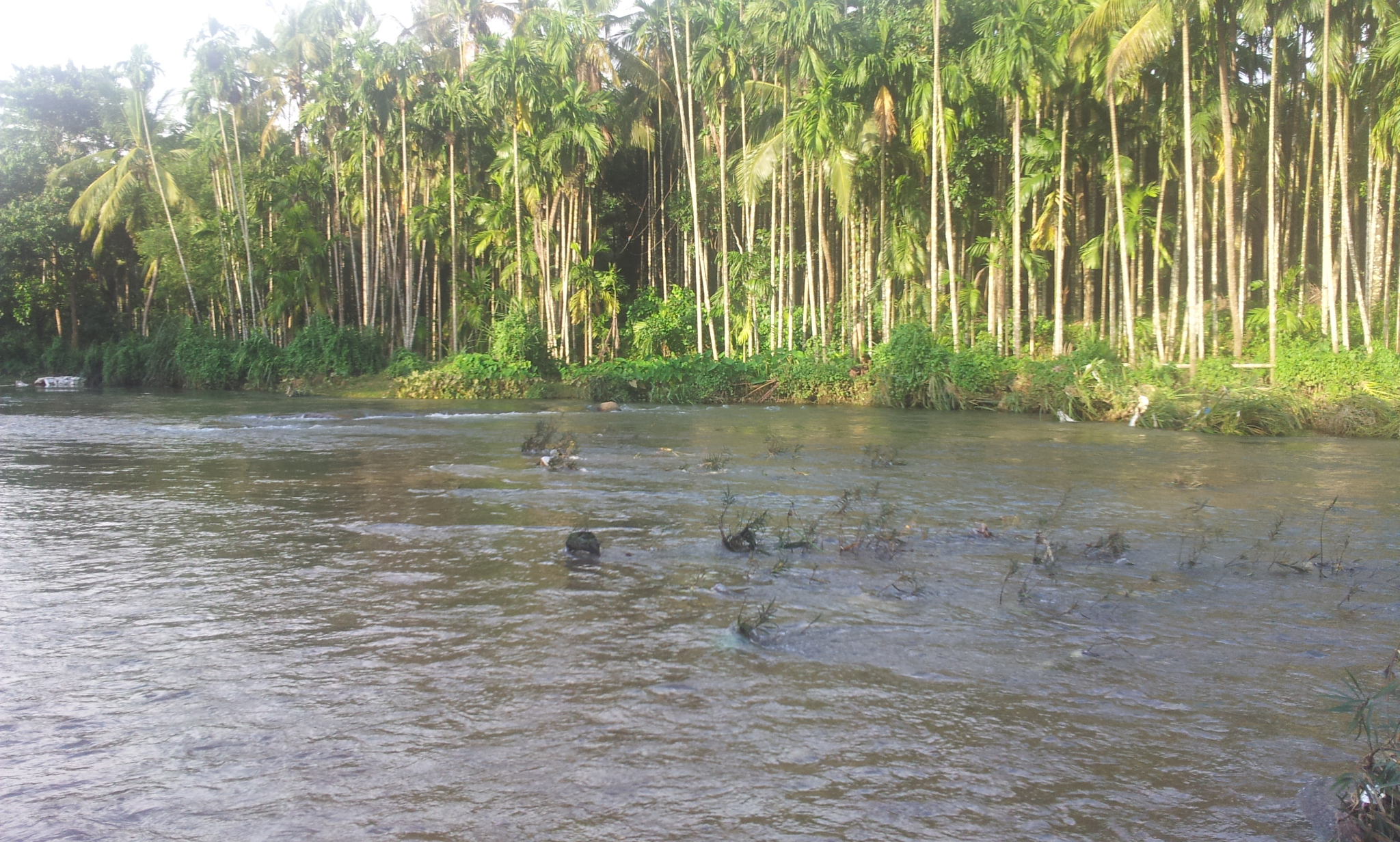
Velliyar River (Velliyar River originates in Silent Valley and merges with Olipuzha river near Melattur to form Kadalundi River)

The 16th century Malayalam poet and the author of Jnanappana, Poonthanam Nambudiri was born at Keezhattur near Perinthalmanna, on the bank of Kadalundi River.

Kerala Varma Valiya Koyi Thampuran (Kerala Kalidasan), Raja Raja Varma (Kerala Panini) and Raja Ravi Varma (Famous Painter) were from different branches of Parappanad Royal Family who migrated from Parappanangadi to Harippad, Changanassery, Mavelikkara and Kilimanoor. Parappanangadi also lies on the bank of Kadalundi River. The Chief Editor of the daily "The Hindu" (1898 to 1905) and Founder Chief Editor of "The Indian Patriot" Divan Bahadur Cozhisseri Karunakara Menon (1863–1922) was also from Parappanangadi. O. Chandu Menon wrote his novels "Indulekha" and "Saradha" while he was the judge at Parappanangadi Munciff Court. Indulekha is also the first Major Novel written in Malayalam language.

== Ecology ==
The Kadalundi River supports a rich estuarine ecosystem at its mouth, forming the 125-acre Kadalundi Bird Sanctuary—a Ramsar-recognized wetland and key stopover for migratory birds during winter. The sanctuary hosts over 100 species, including whimbrels, sandpipers, herons, and the rare crab-plover, with mangroves and mudflats providing critical foraging and nesting habitats. Riparian zones along the river feature diverse flora like mangroves (Avicennia officinalis and Rhizophora mucronata), saltmarsh grass, and casuarina groves, sustaining fish populations such as mullets and prawns for local fisheries.

The basin's brackish waters promote nutrient cycling, but threats include coastal erosion and pollution from upstream agriculture. Conservation efforts by the Kerala Forest Department include mangrove restoration and eco-tourism regulations to protect the wetland's biodiversity.

== Kadalundi Train Crash ==
main article Kadalundi train derailment the accident involved the Mangalore-Chennai Mail passenger train was crossing over the Kadalundi river. Three carriages fell into the water, with 59 people reported killed or missing, and up to 300 believed injured. The official inquiry concluded that the derailment was caused by one pillar of the 140-year old bridge sinking into the riverbed, following recent heavy rain, though this finding has been challenged.

== Villages ==
- Alanallur
- Melattur
- Pandikkad
- Mudikkode (Malappuram)
- Vallikkunnu

== See also ==
- Kadalundi Bird Sanctuary
- Kadalundi train derailment
