= Mullampara, Manjeri =

Mullampara
- Town
- Country: India
- State: Kerala
- District: Malappuram

Languages
  - Official: Malayalam, English
- Time zone: UTC+5:30 (IST)
- PIN: 676121
- Telephone code: 0483
- Vehicle registration: KL10

Mullampara is a town located in the Manjeri Municipality in the Malappuram district of the Indian state of Kerala.

== Geography ==
Mullampara is a residential area approximately two kilometers from Manjeri City. Mullampara is approximately twelve kilometers from Malappuram, the district headquarters. Mullampara comes under Eranad Taluk. Pookkottur, (prominent in the Malabar Rebellion, is about five kilometers away.

== Facilities ==
A Medical College (Previously district hospital, Manjeri), Mini Civil Station, Police Station, Court, etc. are situated about two kilometers from Mullampara.

== Nomenclature ==
The name Mullampara is derived from the massive rock-like structure and the associated cave located near Ambalappadi bus stop. Before the 1980s, the cave provided a comfortable and undisturbed porcupine habitat (Mullan Panni/മുള്ളൻപന്നി). The massive rock (പാറ) and the porcupine gave the town its name of Mullampara (മുള്ളൻപാറ/മുള്ളംമ്പാറ).

== Religion ==
Mullampara is a Muslim-dominated area with a less populous Hindu community. Christians are a minority in this area. Sri Karimkalikavu Devi Temple is a major landmark, adjacent to Matha Amrithananthamayi Math. Ambalappadi bus stop is 200m away. No Christian churches are present. Many mosques are there.

== Health care ==
Manjeri Ayurveda Hospital is situated in Mullampara. Private allopathic, homeopathic, and Ayurvrda practitioners are active.

== Education ==
Government Upper Primary school serves local children. The school functions as a madarassa before school hours. The premises act as a venue for local gatherings during the religious festivals of the Muslim community.

== Culture ==
The dominant culture is based upon Muslim traditions. Duff Muttu, Kolkali, and Aravanamuttu are common folk arts. Libraries are attached to mosques, benefitting Islamic studies. Most of the books are written in Arabi-Malayalam which is a version of the Malayalam language written in Arabic script. People gather in mosques for evening prayer, staying after prayers to discuss social and cultural issues. Business and family issues addressed during these evening meetings. The Hindu minority observes its traditions by celebrating festivals. Hindu rituals are done there as in other parts of Kerala.

== Transport ==
Mullampara village connects to other parts of India through Manjeri town. National Highway No.66 passes through Parappanangadi and the northern stretch connects to Goa and Mumbai. The southern stretch connects to Cochin and Trivandrum. National Highway No.966 connects to Palakkad and Coimbatore. The nearest airport is the Calicut International Airport. The nearest major railway station is in Tirur.Manjeri-Pookkottur road, which connects Manjeri to the district capital Malappuram, passes through Mullampara.
