= Pattarkkulam, Manjeri =

Pattarkkulam
- Pattarkkulam
- Coordinates: 11.119°N 76.090°E
- Country: India
- State: Kerala
- District: Malappuram
- Municipality: Manjeri
- Website: pattarkulam.com

Pattarkulam is a location in Manjeri Municipality in Malappuram district of Kerala State of south India. The majority of Pattarkulam's population is involved with the village's fishing industry.

== Culture ==
Pattarkulam village is a predominantly Muslim populated area. Hindus exist in comparatively smaller numbers. So the culture of the locality is based upon Muslim traditions. Duff Muttu, Kolkali and Aravanamuttu are common folk arts of this locality. There are many libraries attached to mosques giving a rich source of Islamic studies. Most of the books are written in Arabi-Malayalam which is a version of the Malayalam language written in Arabic script. People gather in mosques for the evening prayer and continue to sit there after the prayers discussing social and cultural issues. Business and family issues are also sorted out during these evening meetings. The Hindu minority of this area keeps their rich traditions by celebrating various festivals in their temples. Hindu rituals are done here with a regular devotion like other parts of Kerala.

== Transportation ==
Pattarkulam village connects to other parts of India through Manjeri town. National highway No.66 passes through Parappanangadi and the northern stretch connects to Goa and Mumbai. The southern stretch connects to Cochin and Trivandrum. National Highway No.966 connects to Palakkad and Coimbatore. The nearest airport is at Kozhikode. The nearest major railway station is at Tirur.
