= Eranad taluk =

Eranad Taluk
- Taluk
- Location in Malappuram district, Kerala, India
- Coordinates: 11.152610°N 75.956678°E
- Country: India
- State: Kerala
- District: Malappuram
- Headquarters: Manjeri
- Revenue villages: 23

Languages
  - Official: Malayalam, English
- Time zone: UTC+5:30 (IST)
- Vehicle registration: KL-10

Eranad Taluk comes under Perinthalmanna revenue division in Malappuram district of Kerala, India. Its headquarters is the city of Manjeri. Eranad Taluk consists of 23 revenue villages. Eranad Taluk contains two municipalities - Manjeri and Malappuram. Most of the administrative offices are located in the Civil Station at Malappuram and the Mini-Civil Station at Manjeri.

== History ==
Eranad Taluk in the erstwhile Malabar District

Eranad was the largest taluk in the erstwhile Malabar District in terms of area. After the formation of Kerala state, it continued to be largest taluk in the state, until the formation of Nilambur Taluk in 1990s. At that time the taluk had 6 Revenue blocks in it: Malappuram, Manjeri, Kondotty, Wandoor, Vengara, and Tirurangadi. On 1 November 1957, the Revenue blocks of Vengara, and Tirurangadi, were added to the newly formed Tirur Taluk. In the 1990s a major portion of Wandoor Revenue Block was separated to form Nilambur Taluk. In 2013, Kondotty Taluk was formed by taking some villages from Eranad Taluk.

Eranad Taluk currently has 23 villages.

== Villages ==
Eranad (Manjeri) taluk contains the following villages.

- Malappuram
- Panakkad
- Melmuri
- Payyanad
- Elankur
- Karakunnu
- Trikkalangode
- Kavanoor
- Areekode
- Vettilappara
- Urangattiri
- Kizhuparamba
- Pulpatta
- Narukara
- Perakamanna
- Pookkottur
- Vettikattiri
- Pandikkad
- Chembrasseri
- Anakkayam
- Panthalloor
- Edavanna
- Manjeri

== See also ==
- Eranad
- List of villages in Malappuram district
- List of Gram Panchayats in Malappuram district
- List of desoms in Malappuram district (1981)
- Revenue Divisions of Kerala
