= Payyanad, Manjeri =

Payyanad
- Place
- Country: India
- State: Kerala
- City: Manjeri

Languages
  - Official: Malayalam, English
- Time zone: UTC+5:30 (IST)
- Postal code: 676122
- Vehicle registration: KL10

Payyanad is a place located in Manjeri municipality of Malappuram district of Kerala. Payyanad football stadium is located in Payyanad.

== Sports complex ==
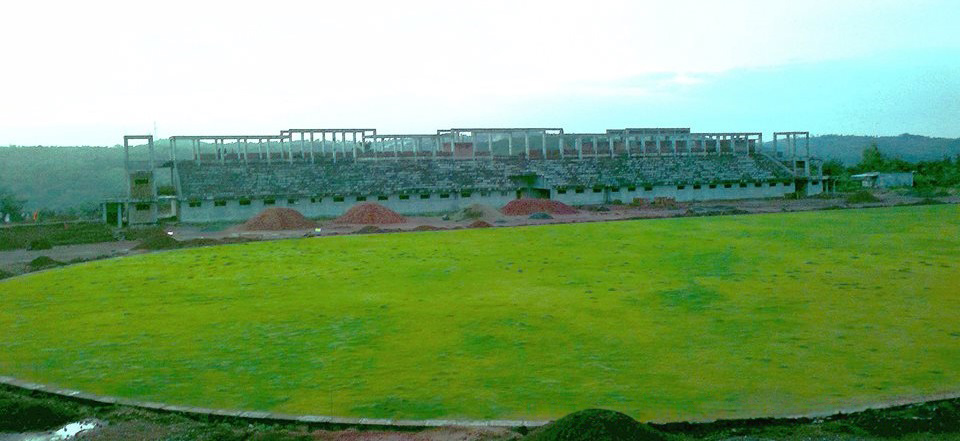
Association football stadium in Payyanad

The Malappuram District Sports Complex is located at Payyanad. A football stadium of 25,000 seating capacity, host the 2014 Federation Cup, as the MLAs in the district have been allotted fund for the stadium.

== Culture ==
Payyanad village is a predominantly Muslim populated area. Hindus exist in comparatively smaller numbers. So the culture of the locality is based upon Muslim traditions. Duff Muttu, Kolkali and Aravanamuttu are common folk arts of this locality. There are many libraries attached to mosques giving a rich source of Islamic studies. Most of the books are written in Arabi-Malayalam which is a version of the Malayalam language written in Arabic script. People gather in mosques for the evening prayer and continue to sit there after the prayers discussing social and cultural issues. Business and family issues are also sorted out during these evening meetings. The Hindu minority of this area keeps their rich traditions by celebrating various festivals in their temples. Hindu rituals are done here with a regular devotion like other parts of Kerala.

== Transportation ==
Payyanad village connects to other parts of India through Manjeri town. National highway No.66 passes through Parappanangadi and the northern stretch connects to Goa and Mumbai. The southern stretch connects to Cochin and Trivandrum. National Highway No.966 connects to Palakkad and Coimbatore. The nearest airport is at Kozhikode. The nearest major railway station is at Tirur.

== Location ==
The site is 5 km far from Manjeri town centre, 13 km from Malappuram, the district HQ and 9 km from Pandikkad. The People of Malappuram, who are very famous for their craziness towards football, are awaiting eagerly to host a National level football championship. The Malappuram District Football Academy is also planned at Payyanad.
