= Elambra, Manjeri =

Village in Kerala, India

Elambra is a location in Payyanad of Manjeri Municipality in Malappuram district of Kerala State of south India.

== Transportation ==
Elambra village connects to other parts of India through Munnar town. National highway No.66 passes through Parappanangadi and the northern stretch connects to Goa and Mumbai. The southern stretch connects to Cochin and Trivandrum. National Highway No.966 connects to Palakkad and Coimbatore. The nearest airport is at Kozhikode. The nearest major railway station is at Tirur.
