= Vayapparappadi, Manjeri =

Settlement in Kerala, India

Vayapparappadi is a location in Manjeri Municipality in Malappuram district of Kerala State of south India.

== Transportation ==
Vayapparapadi village connects to other parts of India through Manjeri town. National highway No.66 passes through Parappanangadi and the northern stretch connects to Goa and Mumbai. The southern stretch connects to Cochin and Trivandrum. National Highway No.966 connects to Palakkad and Coimbatore. The nearest airport is at Kozhikode. The nearest major railway station is at Tirur.
