= Ishaq Kurikkal =

Indian politician

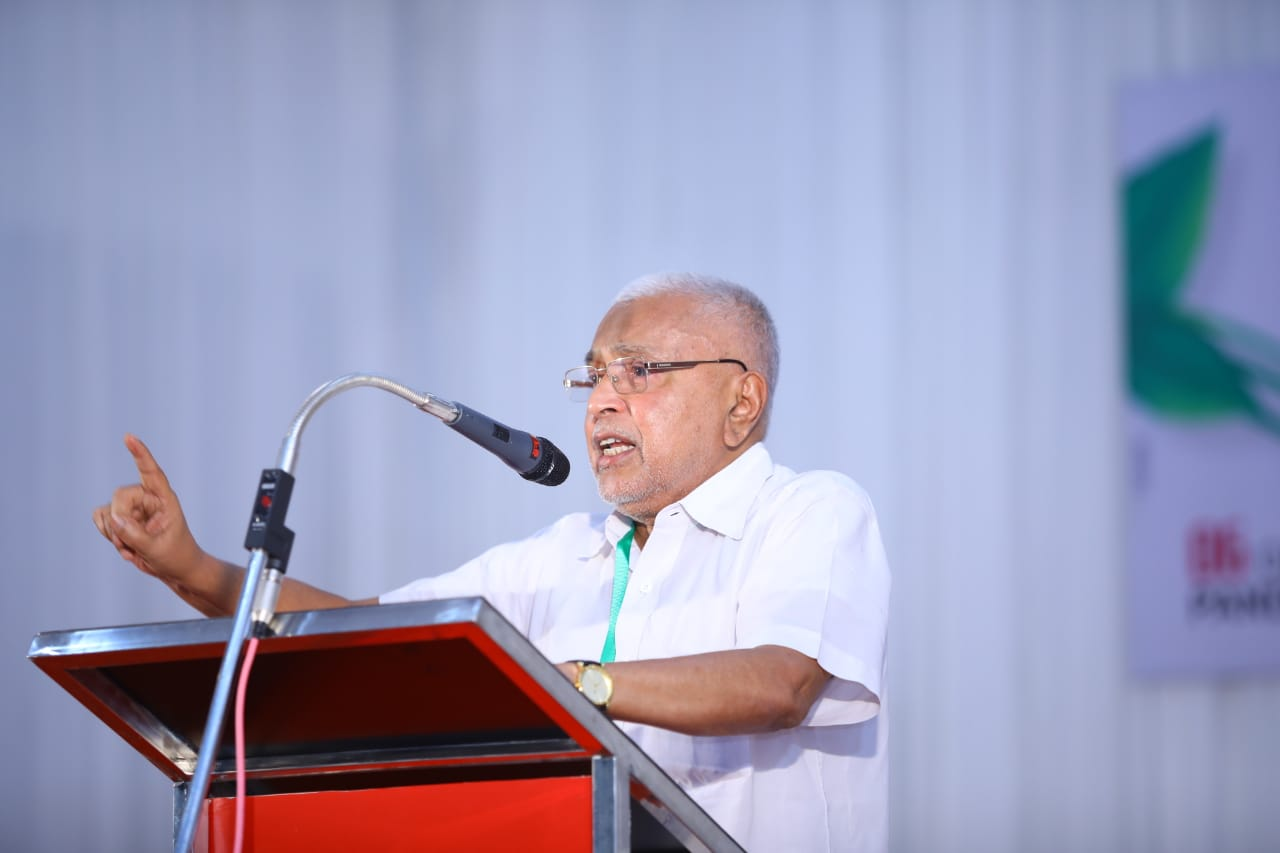
Ishaq Kurikkal, former MLA and Chairman of Manjeri Municipality, Kerala, India.

Ishaq Kurikkal (born 18 June 1950) is a former member of the Kerala Legislative Assembly who, from 1984 to 2006, represented Manjeri of Malappuram district in Kerala. He stepped down as Chairman and Councillor of the Manjeri municipality on 23 April 2013.

He began his political career in 1965 through the Muslim Students Federation (M.S.F.) and later held significant leadership roles. He served as the President of the Taluk Muslim League (1970–1971) and as an Office Bearer of the State Muslim Youth League Committee. From 1971 to 1980, he held various positions in the Muslim Youth League, culminating in his election as a State Executive Committee Member in 1980. Since then, he has served as Secretary of the Indian Union Muslim League (IUML) Committee for the Manjeri Constituency and was also a Member of the State Muslim League High Power Committee.

Kurikkal's public contributions extend beyond politics. He was the first Municipal Chairman of Manjeri Municipality (1982–1984). He also held numerous public and advisory roles, including:

- Member of the Cochin University Syndicate
- Member of the Kerala Library Authority
- Member of the Divisional Railway Users Consultative Committee
- Member of the Central Haj Delegation Committee

A sports enthusiast, he was the district champion in shuttle badminton in 1974 and an individual champion at the VIII Kerala Legislative Assembly sports meet.

Kurikkal represented Kerala internationally as a delegate at the Commonwealth Parliamentary Seminar in London (1985) and participated in the World Malayalee Conference in Germany (1990).
