= District Hospital, Manjeri =

Hospital in India

The hospital which started as a Taluk hospital was later in 1969 upgraded to a District Hospital and lastly to General Hospital on 02/01/2010.

This hospital has upgraded as General Hospital by the State health Minister Smt. P.K. Srimathi. This is the main referral hospital of Malappuram District, Kerala State.

On 2 January 2010 a new block to the hospital was inaugurated. The fund was raised with the help of all local people in Malappuram district, esp. Manjeri, and the help of Central and State governments, in a successful mission by the Malappuram District Panchayat. The new concept of fund raising and planning even coined the term "Malappuram Model" Development.
