= Kovilakamkundu, Manjeri =

Village in Kerala, India

Kovilakamkundu is a location in Manjeri Municipality in Malappuram district of Kerala State of south India.

== Culture ==
Kovilakamkundu village is a predominantly Hindu populated area. People of other religions exist in comparatively smaller numbers. So the culture of the locality is based upon Hindu traditions. Manjeri pooram, Temple and Farmers are in this locality. There are many temples giving a rich source of Hindu studies. The Hindus of this area keeps their rich traditions by celebrating various festivals in their temples. Hindu rituals are done here with a regular devotion like other parts of Kerala.

== Transportation ==
Kovilakamkundu village connects to other parts of India through Manjeri town. National highway No.66 passes through Parappanangadi and the northern stretch connects to Goa and Mumbai. The southern stretch connects to Cochin and Trivandrum. National Highway No.966 connects to Palakkad and Coimbatore. The nearest airport is at Kozhikode. The nearest major railway station is at Tirur.
