= Manjeri =

- Municipality
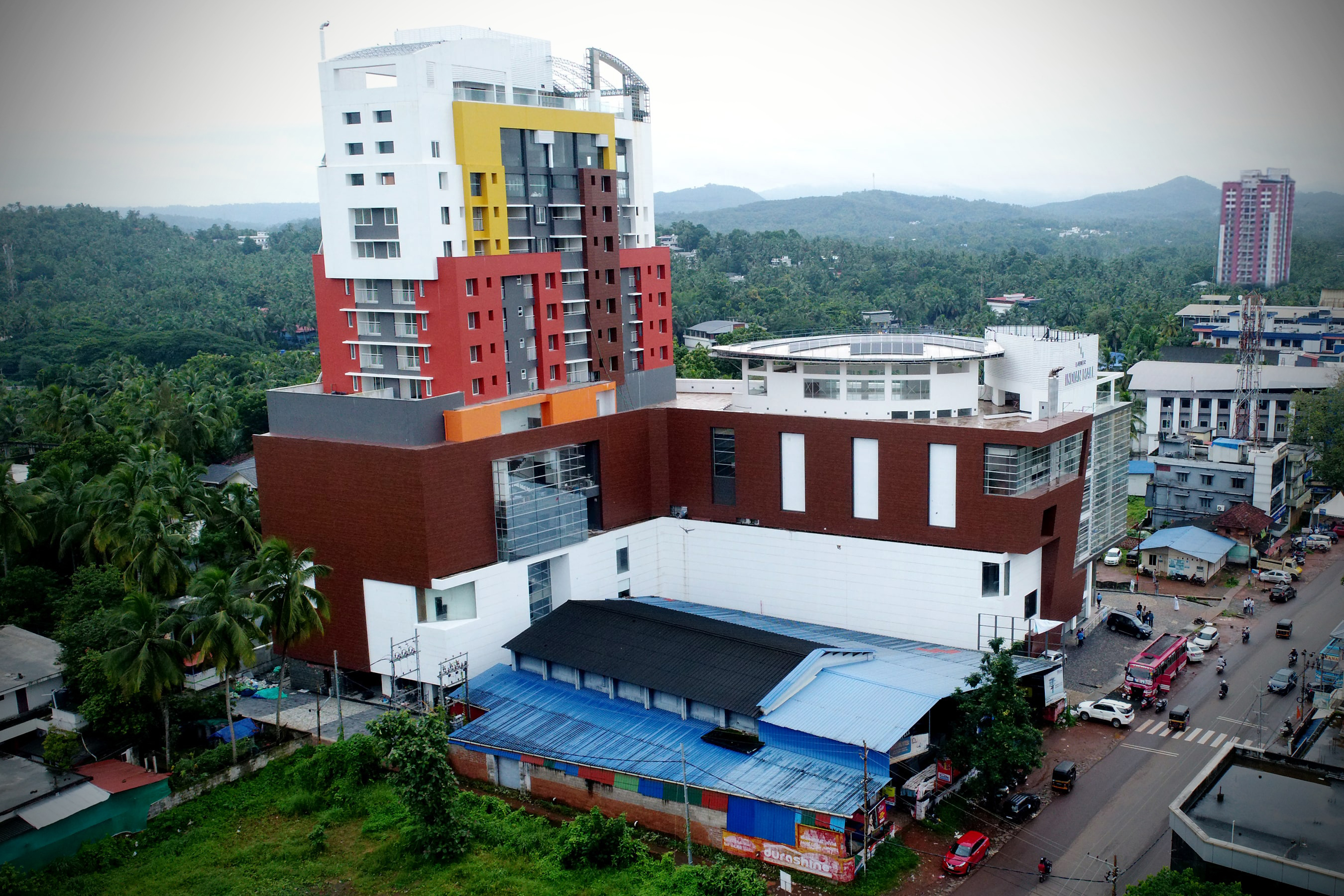
- A view of Manjeri town

- Location within Kerala Location within India Location within Asia Location within Earth
- Coordinates: 11.12°N 76.12°E
- Country: India
- State: Kerala
- District: Malappuram

Government
  - Type: Municipality
  - Body: Manjeri Municipality
  - Chairperson: Abdul Majeed .V (IUML)
  - Vice chairperson: Adv. Beena Joseph (INC)

Area
  - Total: 53.06 km^{2} (20.49 sq mi)
- Elevation: 38 m (125 ft)

Population (2011)
  - Total: 97,102
  - Density: 1,830/km^{2} (4,740/sq mi)

Languages
  - Official: Malayalam, English

Human Development
  - Sex ratio (2011): 1059 ♀/1000♂
  - Literacy (2019): 98.76%
- Time zone: UTC+5:30 (IST)
- PIN: 676121, 676122, 676123
- Telephone code: 0483
- Vehicle registration: KL-10
- Metropolitan area: Malappuram metropolitan area
- Website: manjerimunicipality.lsgkerala.gov.in

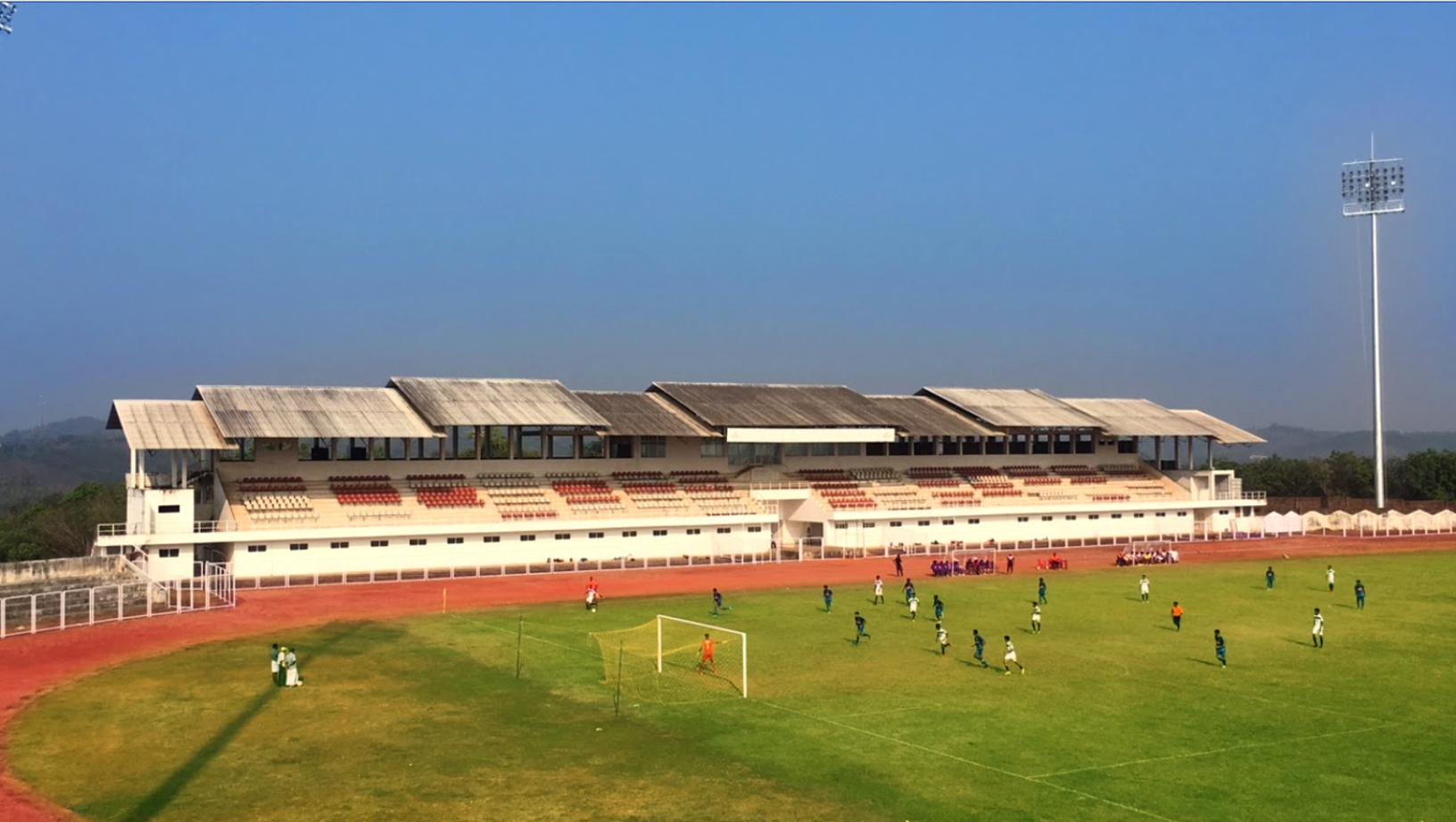
Manjeri Stadium

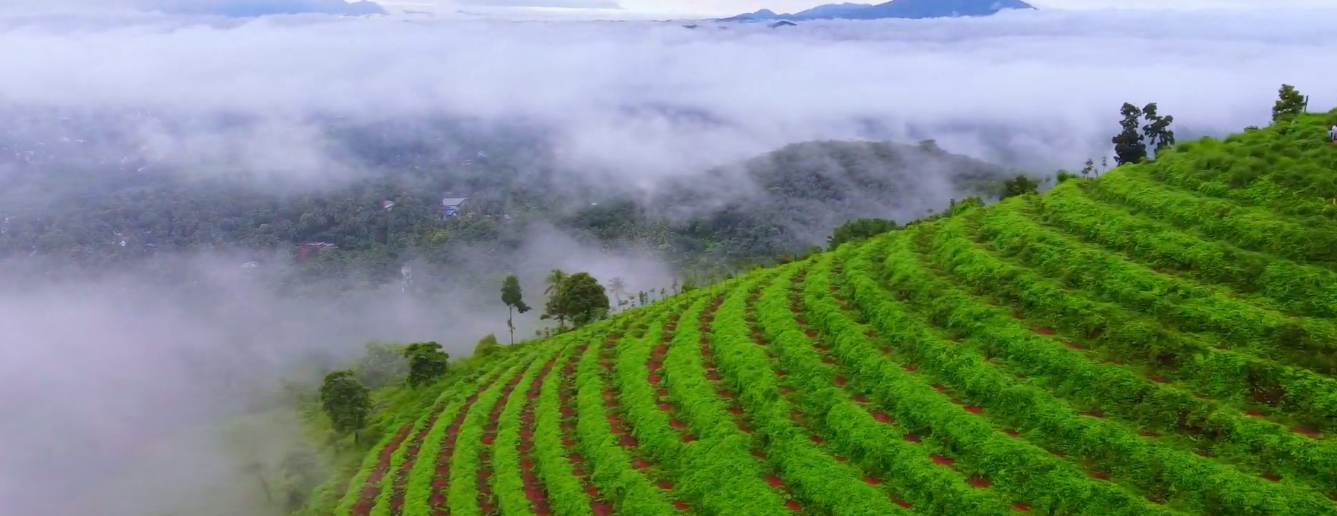
Unity hills in Manjeri

Manjeri (IPA: [mɐɲd͡ʑeːɾi]) is a major town and municipality in Malappuram district, Kerala, India. It is the fourth-most populous municipality in the state. It is situated 23 kilometres (14 mi) southeast of Karipur International Airport and 13 kilometres (8.1 mi) northeast of Malappuram, the district headquarters, and forms a part of the Malappuram metropolitan area. It is one of the major commercial towns under the Malappuram urban agglomeration and serves as the headquarters of Eranad Taluk. Manjeri Municipality is a local self-government institution with a jurisdiction of three villages, namely Manjeri, Payyanad, and Narukara.

== History ==
The remains of pre-historic symbols including Dolmens, Menhirs, and Rock-cut caves that have been found from various parts of Manjeri indicates human life at the region in the Stone Age itself. The region was under the control of Zamorins in medieval period. There was a set pattern of succession, indicated by Sthanams (ranks) in the royal line in the Kingdom of Zamorins. Five Sthanams were defined in the kingdom of Zamorin, each with its own separate property enjoyed in succession by the senior members of the three Kovilakams (palaces) of the family . One of these five Sthanams came to be known as Edattaranadu Nambiyathiri Thirumulpadu (the Etatralpadu), which is mentioned in the Manjeri Pulapatta inscription as the overlord of the "Three Hundred" Nairs. The Etatralpadu used to reside in a palace at Edathara near Manjeri. Manjeri Kovilakam was one of the seats of the ruling families of the Zamorins of Calicut.

Manjeri was once the headquarters and the military centre of the Kingdom of Mysore under Tipu Sultan. Under British rule, Manjeri served as the administrative headquarters of Eranad subdistrict, which was the largest subdistrict within the Malabar District. In 1896, the landlords of Manjeri Kovilakam started to evacuate the tenants from their lands. The landless tenants started to revolt under the leadership of Variyan Kunnathu Kunjahammed Haji. They seized the land and properties of the landlords. British army came to help the landlords. The conflict caused the British to risk 94 out of 100 soldiers.

The Malabar district political conference of Indian National Congress held at Manjeri on 28 April 1920, fueled Indian independence movement and national movement in British Malabar. That conference declared that the Montagu–Chelmsford Reforms were not able to satisfy the needs of British India. It also argued for a land reform to seek solutions for the problems caused by tenancy that existed in Malabar. However, the decision widened the drift between extremists and moderates within the Congress. The conference resulted in dissatisfaction of landlords with the Indian National Congress. It caused the leadership of the Malabar district Congress Committee to come under the control of the extremists who stood for labourers and the middle class.

The region has been part of movements such as Khilafat Movement and Malabar rebellion following the Manjeri conference. It was one of the strongholds of the Malabar Rebellion in 1921. Manjeri police station was destructed by the rebels on 21 August 1921. The protestors won in removing the colonial rule from the region and establish self-rule for about six months. After Indian independence in 1947, the region continued in Malabar District. In 1969, it became a part of the newly formed Malappuram district. Now it forms a part of the Malappuram metropolitan area.

== Demographics ==
Total population under municipality limits is 97,102 according to the 2011 census. Males form 48.6% and females 51.4%. Malayalam is the widely spoken language in the town. Manjeri has been a multi-ethnic and multi-religious town since the early medieval period. The Muslims form the largest religious group, followed by Hindus and Christians. The municipality of Manjeri has an average literacy rate of 95.8%.

Saint Gregorios Orthodox Church serves the Malankara Orthodox Christians in Manjeri under the Diocese of Malabar of the Malankara Orthodox Syrian Church.

== Geography ==
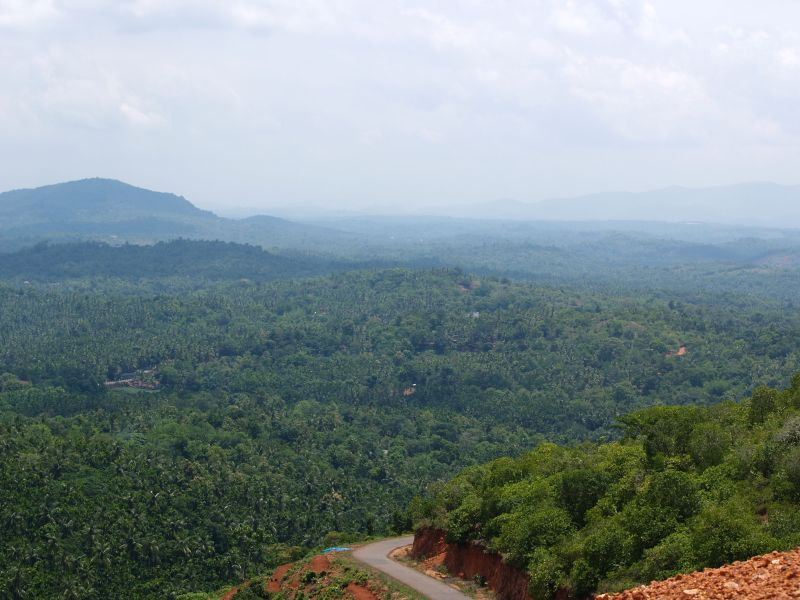
Valamangalam viewpoint, Manjeri

Manjeri is located at 11.12°N 76.12°E. It has an average elevation of 38 metres (124 feet) from sea level.

== Civic administration ==
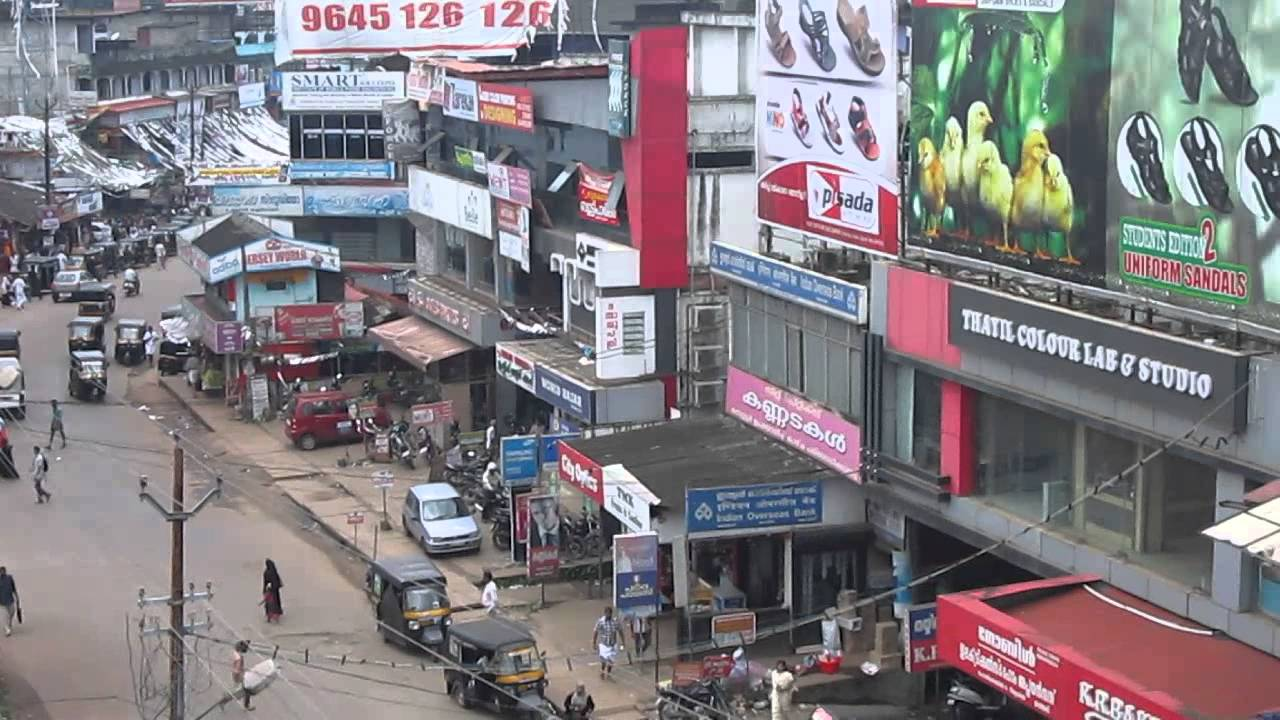
A view of Manjeri town

The town is administered by the Manjeri Municipality, headed by a chairperson. For administrative purposes, the town is divided into 50 wards, from which the members of the municipal council are elected for five years. The municipality comes under the jurisdiction of Manjeri police station (formerly known as Eranad Police Station at the time of its formation), which was formed on 14 April 1879. The apex district court of Malappuram district is at Manjeri and the judicial district is known as Manjeri judicial district.

Manjeri Municipality

=== Manjeri Municipality Election 2020 ===
S.No.	Party name	Party symbol	Number of Councillors
01	UDF		27
02	LDF		14
03	Independents		09

== Wards ==
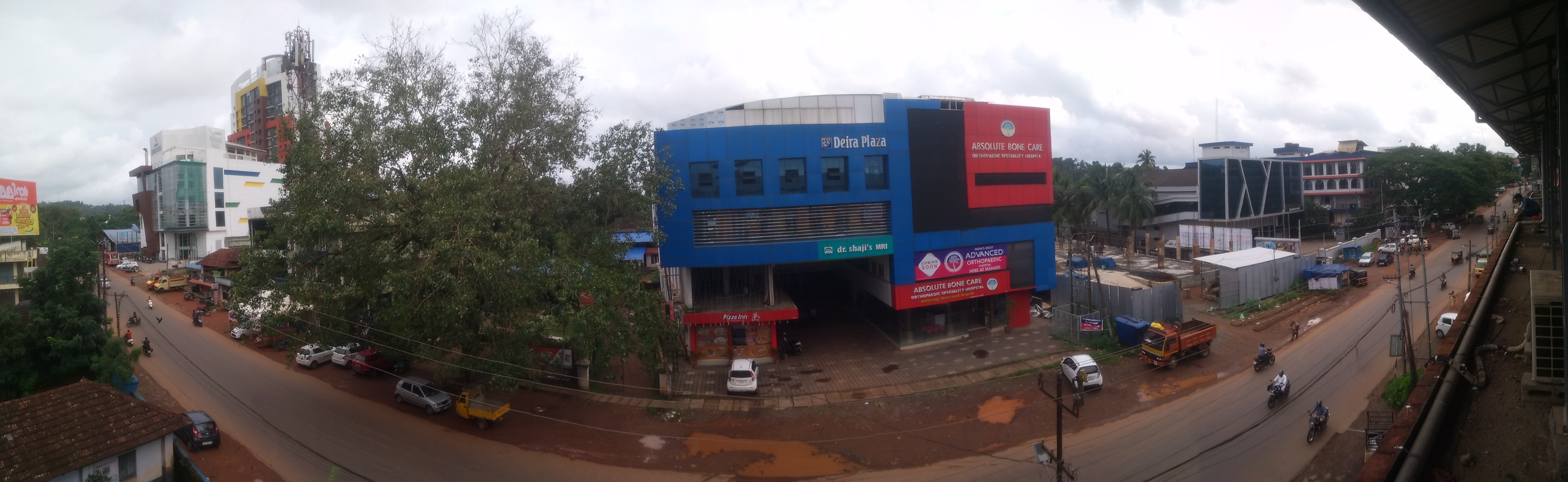
A panoramic view of Calicut Road, Manjeri

Manjeri Municipality is composed of the following 50 wards:

Ward no.	Name	Ward no.	Name
1	Kidangazhi	2	Erambra
3	Pullur	4	Chettiyangadi
5	Cherani	6	Nelliparamba
7	Melakkam	8	Chullikkad
9	Thadathikuzhi	10	Kozhikkattukunnu
11	Punnakuzhi	12	Mangalassery
13	Palakkulam	14	Thanippara
15	College Kunnu	16	Kizhakkekara
17	Vadakkangara	18	Payyanad
19	Elambra	20	Athanikkal
21	Thamarassery	22	Nellikuth-I
23	Nellikuth-II	24	Chalukulam
25	Kizhakkekunnu	26	Pilakkal
27	Amayamkode	28	Pullenchery
29	Vettekode	30	Vellerangal
31	Vayparapadi	32	Kovilakamkundu
33	Town Ward	34	Shanthi Gramam
35	Arukizhaya	36	Ulladankunnu
37	Mullampara	38	Vakkethodi
39	Thadathiparamba	40	Vattappara
41	Puliyanthodi	42	Thurakkal
43	Pottammal	44	Pattarkulam
45	Mariyad	46	Veemboor
47	Narukara	48	Ambalappadi
49	Karuvambram	50	Ramankulam

== Important Institutions ==
=== Government ===
Courts in Manjeri

- Manjeri Judicial District
- District Court, Manjeri
- Assistant Sessions Court, Manjeri
- Fast Track I, Manjeri
- Fast Track II, Manjeri
- Fast Track III, Manjeri
- SC/ST Special Court, Manjeri
- MACT Court, Manjeri
- CJM Court, Manjeri
- Judicial First Class Magistrate Court I Manjeri
- Judicial First Class Magistrate Court II (Forest) Manjeri
- Municiff Court Manjeri

Other Government Institutions within Manjeri

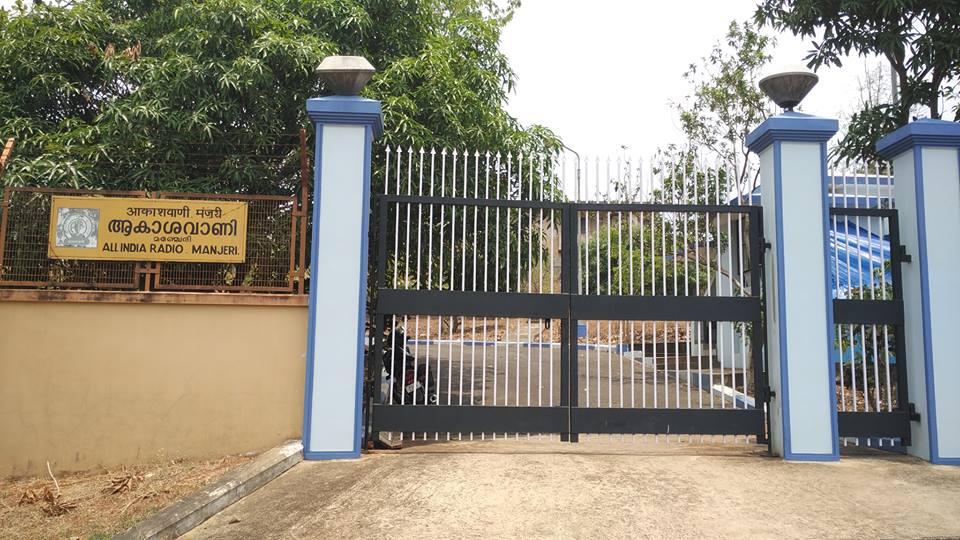
AIR Manjeri FM Radio Station

- Municipal Office Manjeri
- Government Medical College, Manjeri
- Eranad Taluk Office, Manjeri
- AIR Manjeri FM Radio Station
- Manjeri Postal Division
- Head Post Office Manjeri
- Excise Range Office, Manjeri
- Excise Office, Manjeri
- KSEB North & South Offices, Manjeri
- Fire & Rescue Unit, Manjeri
- BEVCO outlet, Manjeri
- Telephone Exchange, Manjeri
- KSRTC Station master office, Manjeri
- PWD Office, Manjeri
- Sub Jail Manjeri
- Sales Tax office, Manjeri
- Taluk Civil Supply office, Manjeri
- Sub Registrar officer, Manjeri
- Sub Treasury office, Manjeri
- Stamp Dipott Manjeri
- Guest House, Manjeri
- Water Authority, Anakkayam
- Manjeri Circle office
- Traffic Unit Manjeri
- Cashew nut Research Centre, Anakkayam

=== Education ===
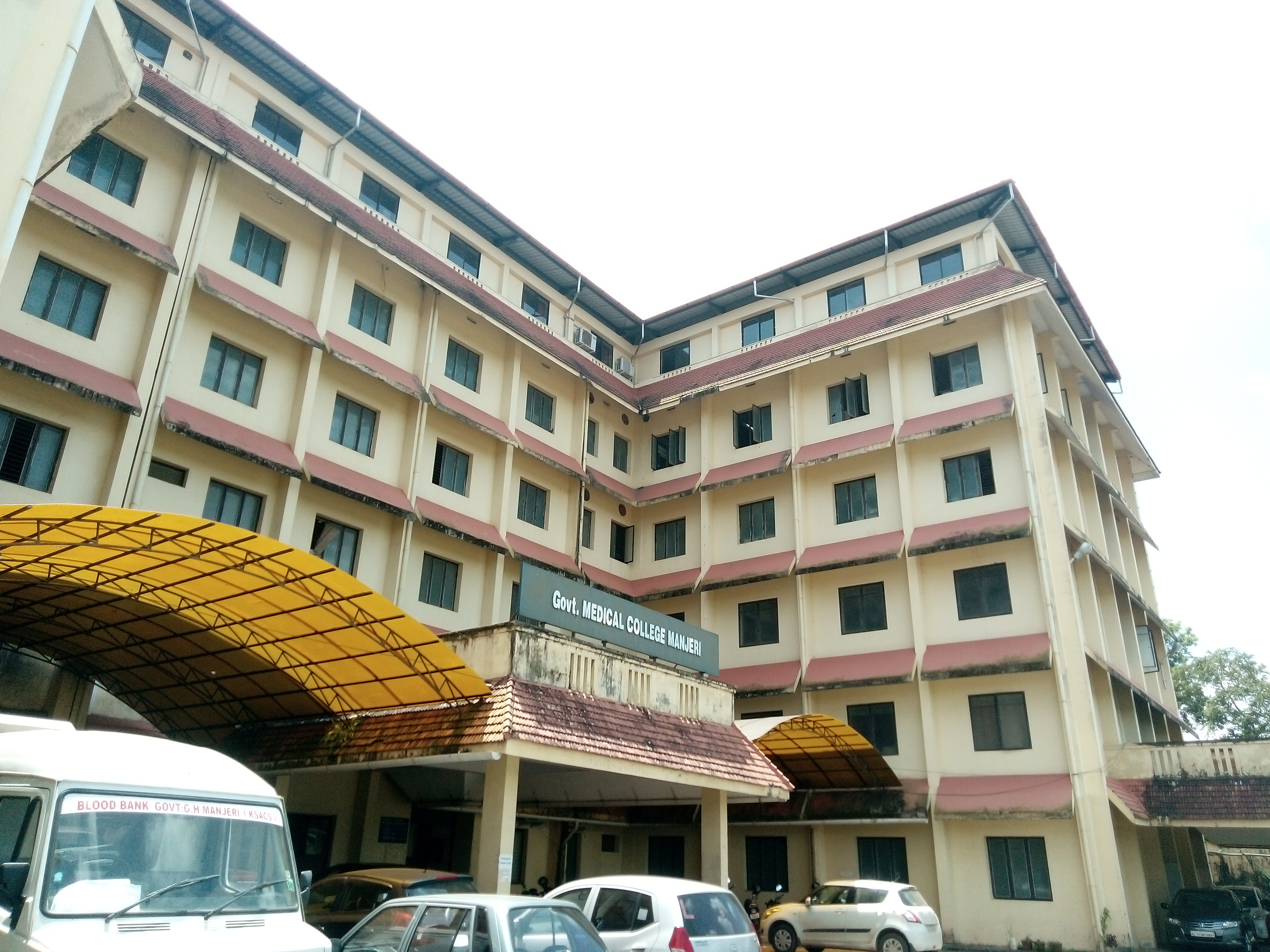
Government Medical College, Manjeri

Important Educational Institutions within Manjeri

- N.S.S College, Manjeri
- Eranad Knowledge City, Manjeri
- Eranad Knowledge City College of Engineering, Manjeri
- Government Medical College, Manjeri
- Cooperative Arts & Science College Manjeri
- Korambayil Ahammed Haji Memorial Unity Women's College, Manjeri
- Govt. Poly Technic Manjeri
- Government Boys HSS Manjeri
- Govt Girls HSS Manjeri
- HMYHSS Manjeri
- Govt Higher Secondary School Irumbuzhi Manjeri
- Vocational Higher Secondary School Nellikkuth Manjeri
- Vocational Higher secondary school Pullanoor
- Govt High School Elankoor
- Amritha Vidya Peedam Manjeri
- NSS English Medium School Manjeri
- Govt. LPS Manjeri
- Govt.UP School Manjeri
- Ace Public School Manjeri
- Noble Public School Manjeri
- Chinmaya public School
- Mubarack English Medium School
- Nazareth English medium School
- AMUPS Vadakangara
- Alfalah Public School
- MIC Valluvambram
- Blossom Public School
- Manavedan UPS Thrikkalangode
- Jamia Islamia Higher Secondary school
- Shanmugha vilasam School Karikkad
- ICS public School Manjeri
- Charangavu PMS School Elankur
- AMUPS Mullambara
- Valluvambram UPS
- Khadheeja English Medium Pappinippara
- AUPS Pappinippara
- Al Huda English Medium Pappinippara
- Rahmath Public medium school
- AUPS Thottappara
- AMLPS Karaparamba
- CHM Highschool Pookolathoor
- GLPS School Manjeri Vayapparappadi
- Good Hope School Mangalassery

=== Healthcare ===
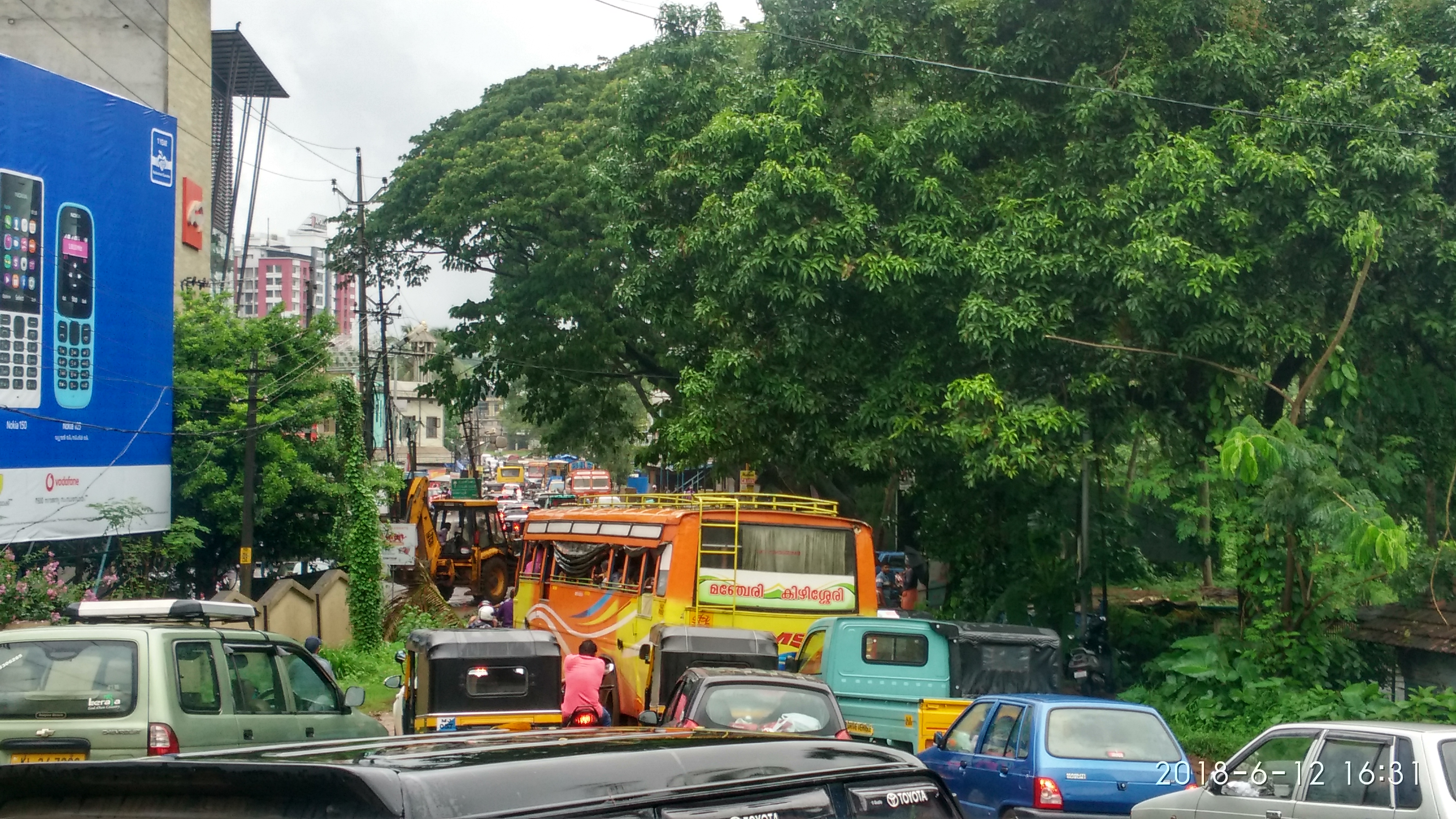
Thurakkal Bypass Junction, Manjeri

Important Healthcare Institutions within Manjeri

- Government Medical College, Manjeri
- Government General Hospital, Manjeri
- Government TB Hospital, Manjeri
- Eranad Hospital Manjeri
- Prasanthi Hi tech Hospital, Manjeri
- Malabar Hospital Manjeri
- KMH Hospital Manjeri
- Manu Memorial Hospital Manjeri
- Mana sneha Hospital, Muttipalam, Manjeri
- Ayurvedic Hospital Mullambara Manjeri
- Govt Primary Health Centre Mangalassery
- Govt Primary Health Centre Thrippanachi
- Veterinary hospital Manjeri
- Veterinary hospital Pookolathoor

=== Finance ===
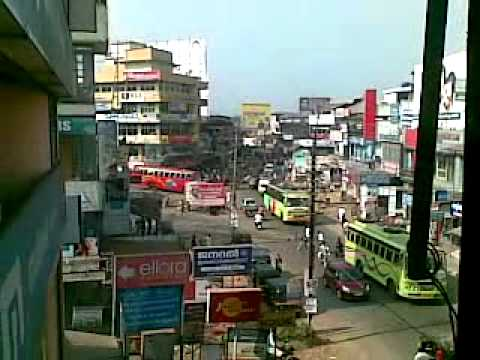
Near Manjeri Bus Station

Important Financial Institutions within Manjeri

- Union Bank Of India Manjeri
- KSFE, Manjeri
- Thrikkalangode Service Co-operative Bank
- Pulpatta Service Co-operative Bank
- Service Co-operative Bank Mailuth
- Elankur Service Co-operative Bank, Pelepuram
- Payyanad Co-operative Service Bank
- Ernad Co-operative Bank, Nilambur Road, Manjeri
- Anakkayam Service Co-operative Bank
- Axis Bank, Manjeri
- Bank of Baroda, Manjeri
- Bank of India, Manjeri
- Canara Bank, Manjeri
- Catholic Syrian Bank, Manjeri
- Manjeri Co-operative Bank
- District Co-Operative Bank, Manjeri
- Federal Bank, Manjeri
- HDFC Bank, Manjeri
- ICICI Bank, Manjeri
- Indian Bank, Manjeri
- Indian Overseas Bank, Manjeri
- Yes Bank, Manjeri
- Punjab National Bank, Manjeri
- South Indian Bank, Manjeri
- Kerala Gramin Bank, Manjeri
- State Bank of India Manjeri
- Syndicate Bank, Manjeri
- UAE Exchange Bank, Manjeri
- Cholamandalam Finance, Manjeri
- Sreeram Investments Manjeri
- Sundram Finance Manjeri
- Sree Gokulam Chitts & Finance Manjeri
- Manapuram General Finance Leesing Limited, Manjeri
- Sree Lakshmi Bankers, Manjeri

== Sports ==
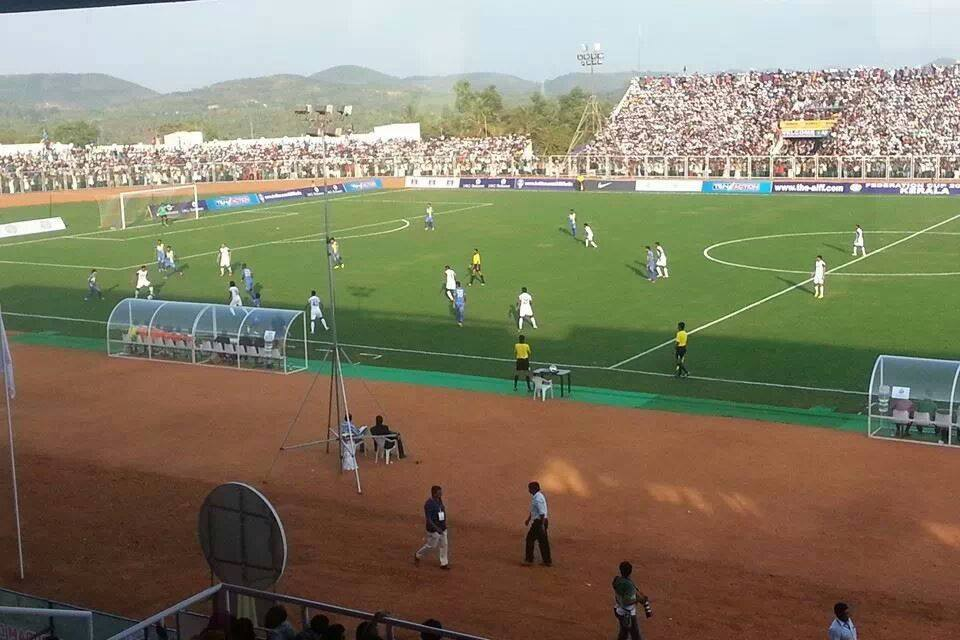
MDSC Stadium during 2013–14 Indian Federation Cup

The Malappuram District Sports Complex & Football Academy is situated at Payyanad, Manjeri. MDSC Stadium was selected as one of two stadiums, along with the Jawaharlal Nehru Stadium, to host the group stages of the 2013–14 Indian Federation Cup. The stadium hosted groups B and D.

== Notable people ==
- Ali Musliyar - Freedom activist.
- Arjun Jayaraj - Footballer.
- Variyan Kunnathu Kunjahammed Haji - Indian Freedom Fighter.
- M. P. M. Ahammed Kurikkal - Former minister of Kerala.
- K. T. Muhammed - Malayalam playwright and screenwriter.
- Ishaq Kurikkal - Politician.
- T. K. Hamza - Former minister of Kerala.
- U. A. Latheef - Politician, Lawyer.
- Shanavas Shanu - Actor.
- Anikha - Actress.
- Dhanish Karthik - Actor.
- M.P. Jabir - Athlete

== See also ==
- Government Medical College, Manjeri
- Manjeri stadium
- AIR Manjeri FM
- N.S.S College, Manjeri
- Korambayil Ahammed Haji Memorial Unity Women's College, Manjeri
- District Hospital, Manjeri
- Manjeri (State Assembly constituency)
- Malappuram (Lok Sabha constituency)
- Anakkayam
- Malappuram
- Eranad Taluk
- Eranad
