= Narukara, Manjeri =

Narukara
- Place
- Country: India
- State: Kerala
- District: Malappuram district
- City: Manjeri

Languages
  - Official: Malayalam, English
- Time zone: UTC+5:30 (IST)
- Postal code: 676122
- Vehicle registration: KL10

Narukara is a location in Manjeri Municipality near Manjeri in Malappuram district of Kerala State of south India.

== Location ==
The village is located on the state highway of Manjeri-Calicut (Calicut-Nilambur-Gudalore), 3 km away from Manjeri (the municipal capital). Number of educational institutions like post graduate colleges, higher secondary schools are in Narukara.

== Landmarks ==
The major highlights in the place are "Naru Madhura Bhagavathi Temple", Unity Women's College (aided PG College of Calicut university), H.M College of Science and Technology, NSS English School, Sisters of Nazareth School, AUPS Pattarkulam, Al Huda English School Pattarkulam, GLP School Narukara, Matha Amrithananda Mayee Madom and School and Science Institute.

== Economy ==
Other commercial institutes like Apco automobiles, PSN automobiles, Shakti automobiles, Eicher service center (showroom) etc. also having showrooms here.

== Culture ==
Naruka Derived its name from the "Naru Madhura Meenakshi" Temple. Narukara was once a Nair dominated area who indulged in Farming and owned most of the land in Narukara. Narukara's major festival is Karthika Vilakku Uthsavam, this is celebrated every year during December month. Durga devotees from various places in around Narukara convene at the temple for a grand feast and cultural events. Every religious people live in peace and harmony at Narukara, this is a very beautiful place.

== Transportation ==
Narukara village connects to other parts of India through Manjeri town. National highway No.66 passes through Parappanangadi and the northern stretch connects to Goa and Mumbai. The southern stretch connects to Cochin and Trivandrum. National Highway No.966 connects to Palakkad and Coimbatore. The nearest airport is at Kozhikode. The nearest major railway station is at Tirur.
