= Thacholikali =

Thacholikali is a folk art performed during the Mandala Utsavam, forty-one day annual festival at the Lokanarkavu Bhagavathy Temple. Lokanarkavu temple is situated 5 km from Vatakara, a small town in Kerala state of South India. This dance, performed during the festival resembles the martial art Kalarippayattu.

== See also ==
- Arts of Kerala
