= Anakkayam =

- Outgrowth of Malappuram city
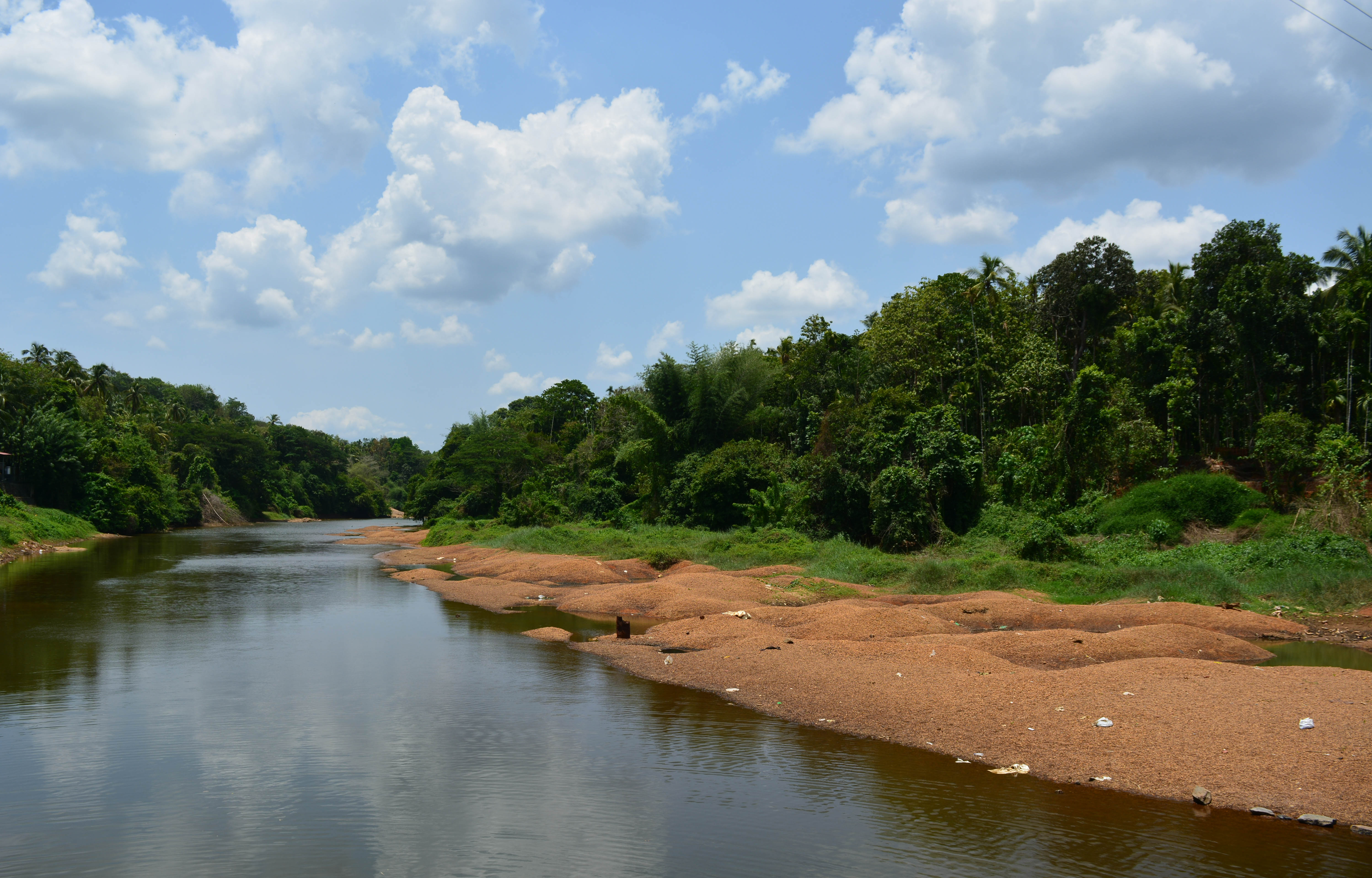
- Kadalundi River at Anakkayam
- Interactive map of Anakkayam
- Coordinates: 11°5′2″N 76°7′13″E
- Country: India
- State: Kerala
- District: Malappuram

Area
  - Total: 45.23 km^{2} (17.46 sq mi)

Languages
  - Official: Malayalam, English
- Time zone: UTC+5:30 (IST)
- Postal code: 676509
- Vehicle registration: KL-10

Anakkayam is an outgrowth of Malappuram city in Kerala, India. A major portion of Pandallur hills (a hill in the central part of Malappuram district, which was the boundary between Eranad and Walluvanad Taluks in Malabar District under British Raj) lie in this area.

The Agricultural Research station (part of Kerala Agricultural University) started as the Cashew Research station, Anakkayam in 1963.

== Gallery ==
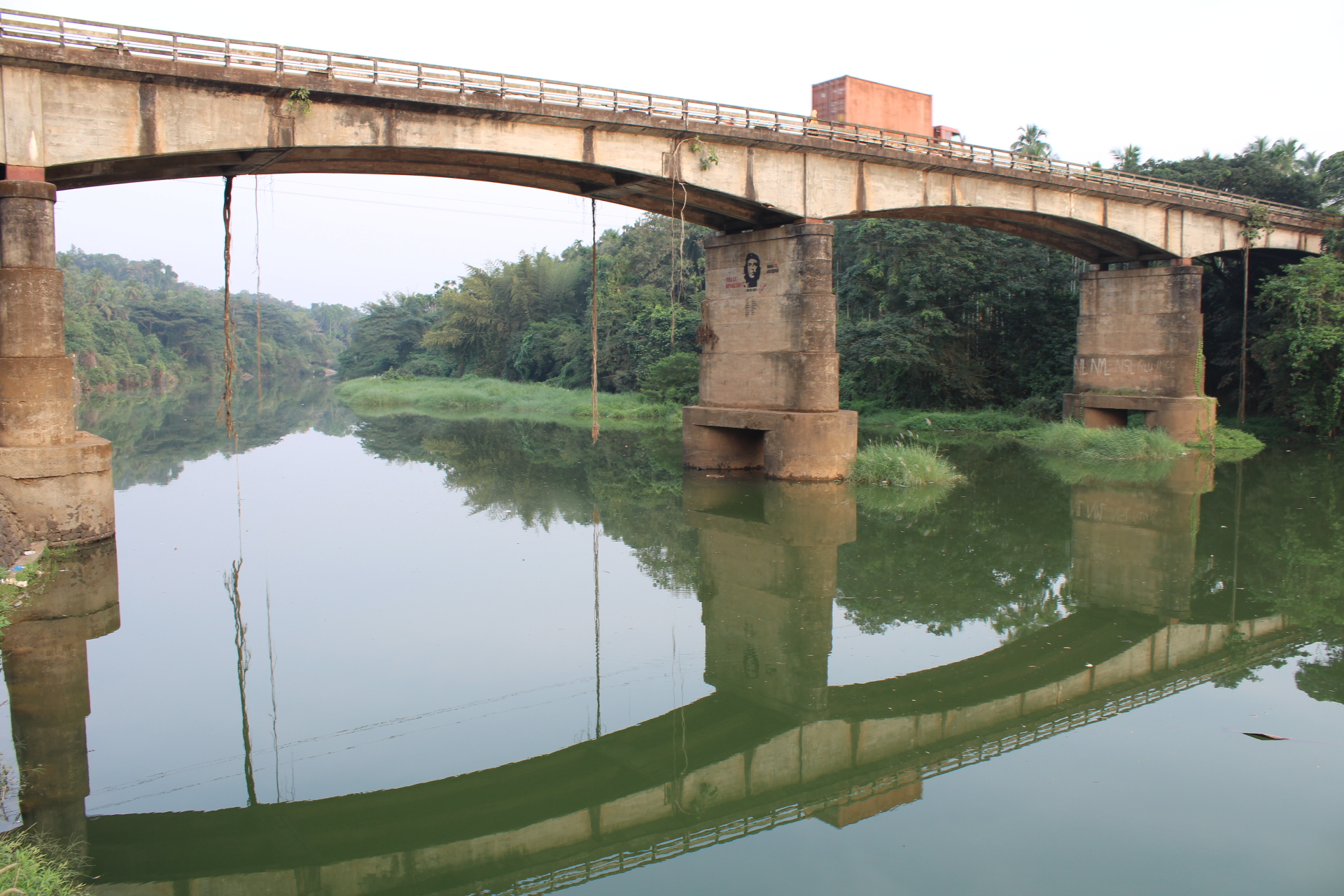
Anakkayam Bridge, Malappuram

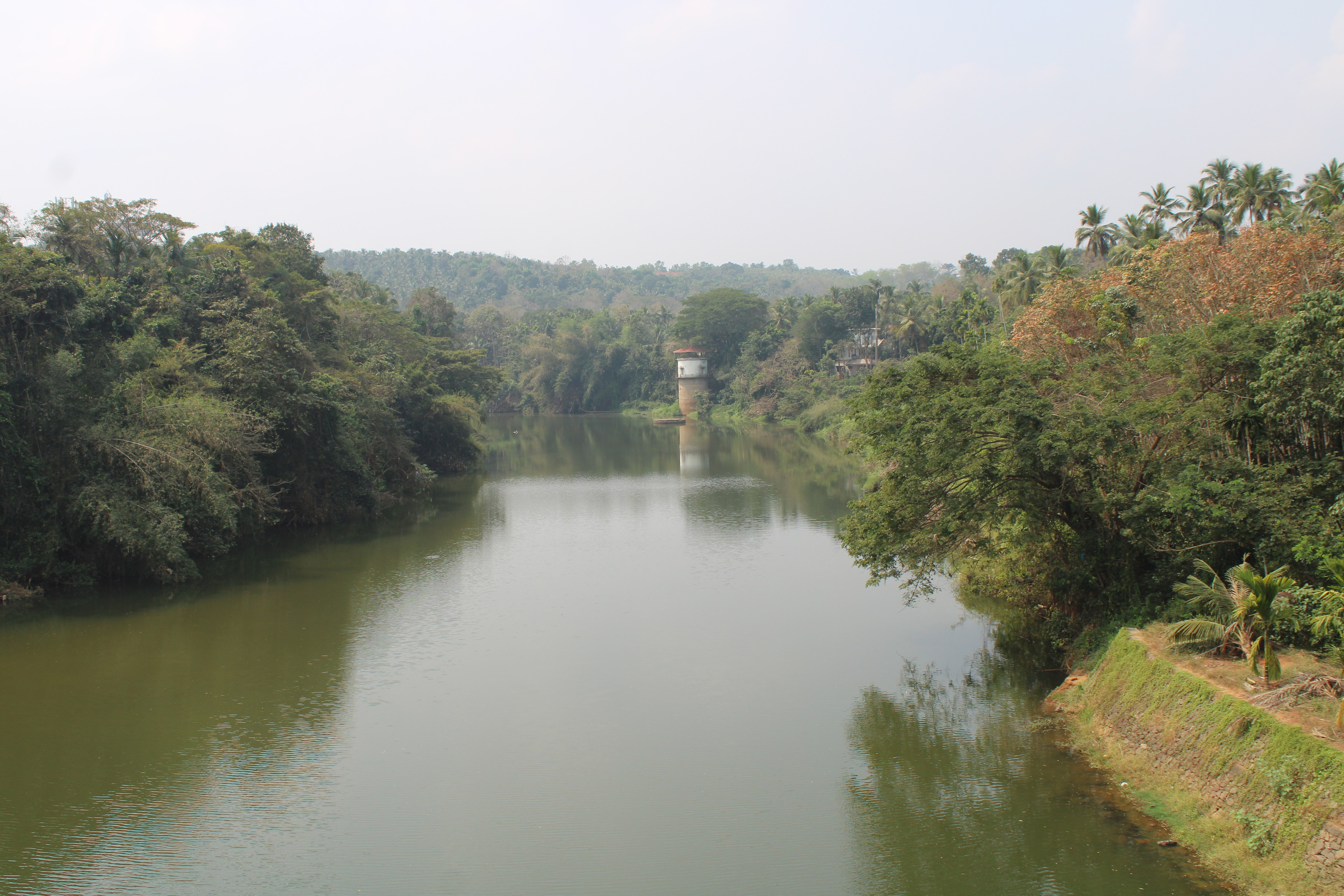
Pump House, Anakkayam

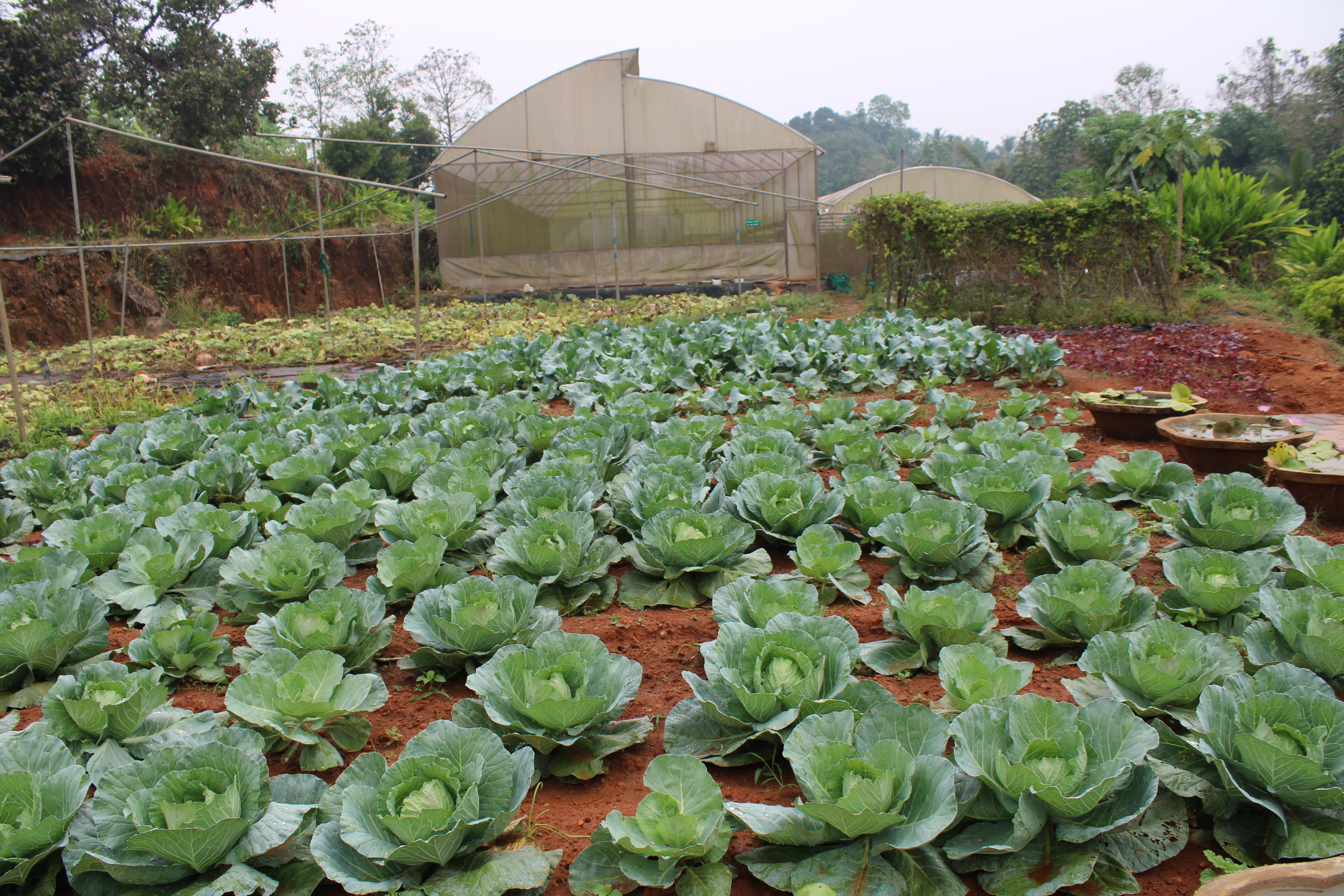
Cabbage cultivation, Anakkayam-ACRS

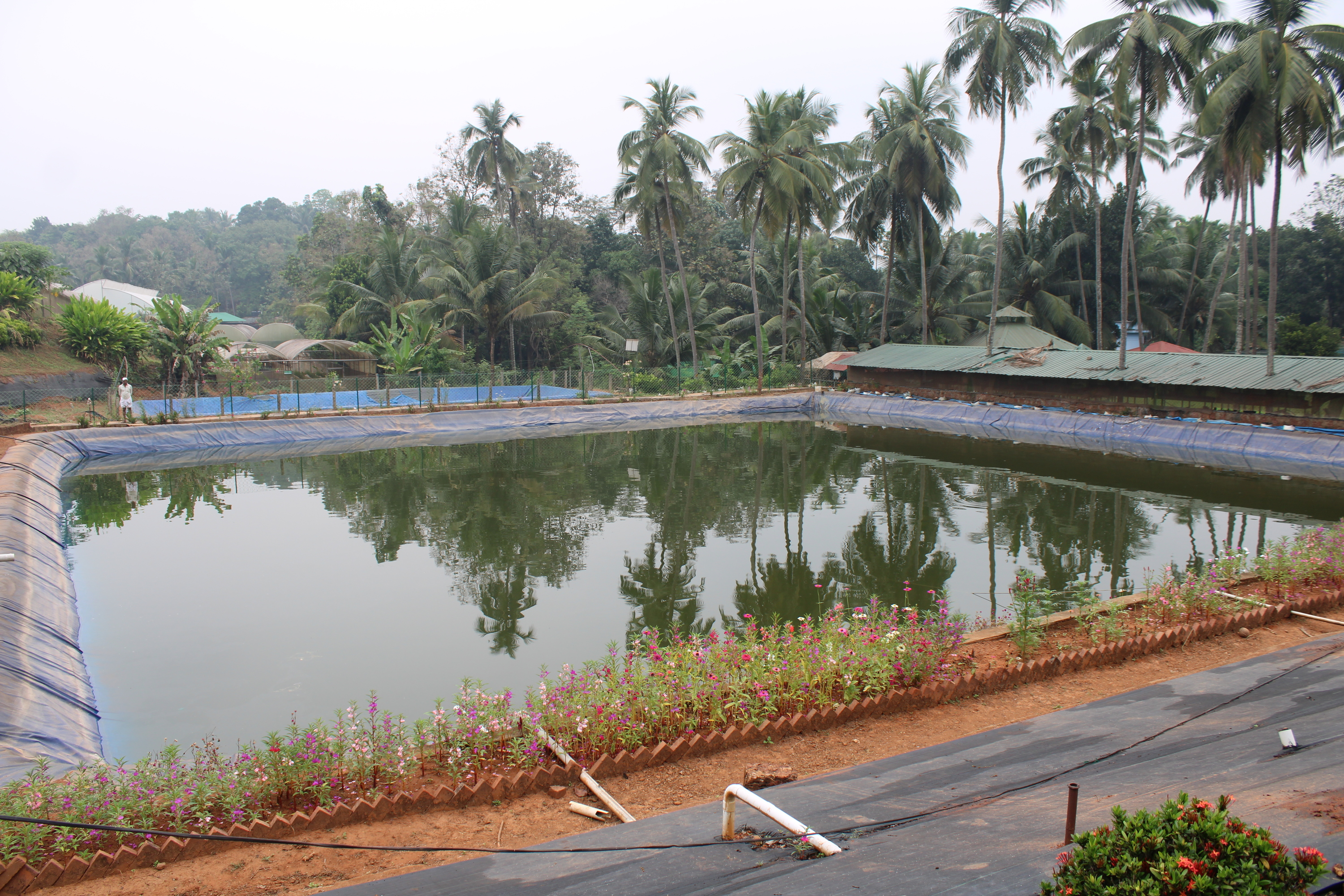
Raindropspond1, Anakkayam
