= Kolkali =

Folk art performed in Malabar region of Kerala, India

Beginning of Kolkali by the Hindus of Malabar. This distinct and complex art includes styles like 'Vandhanakali,' 'Vattakol,' 'Thettikol,' 'Thaduthukali,' and 'Irunnukali.' Due to political reasons, it is not included in the Kerala School Kalolsavam.

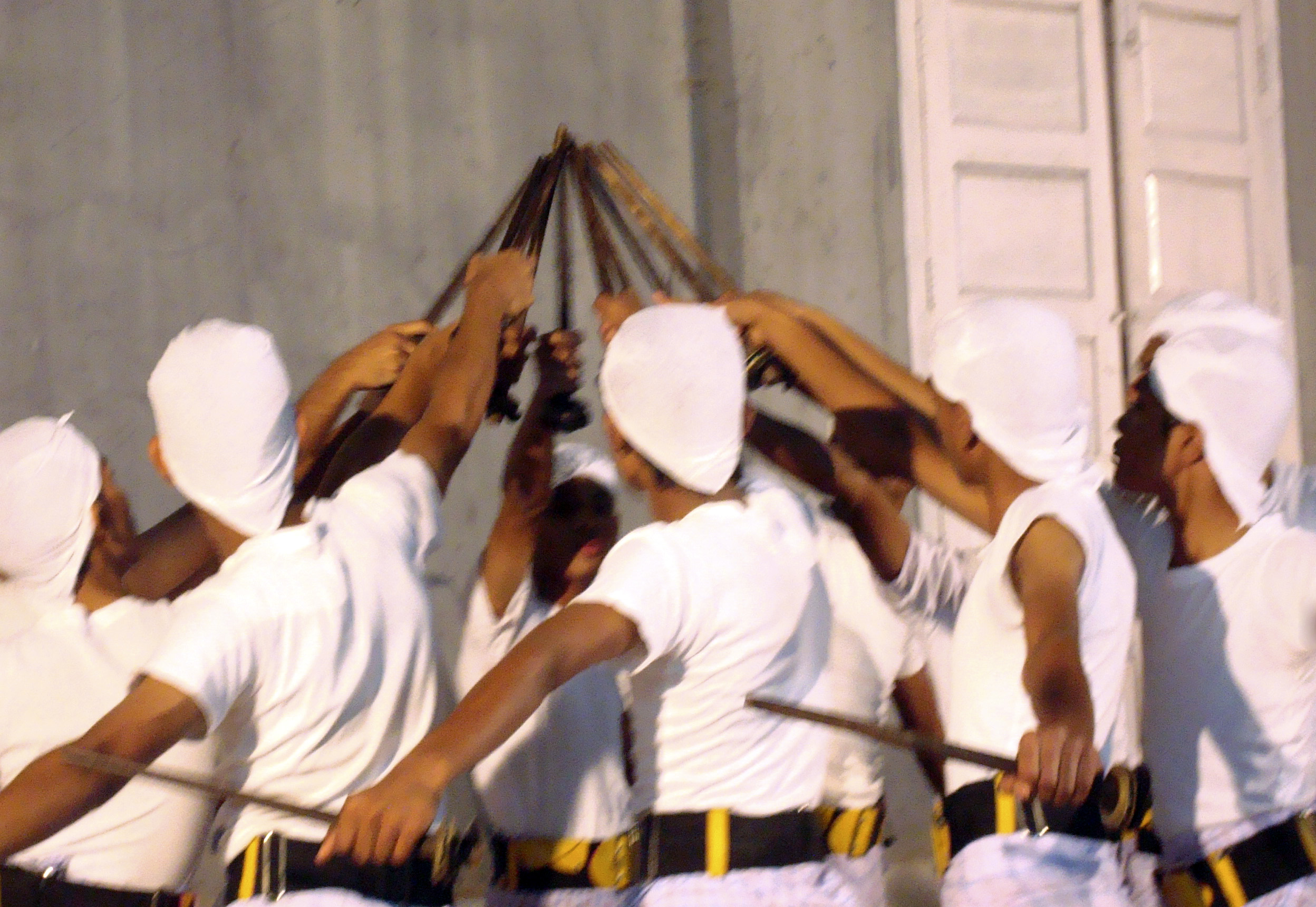
Performers of kolkali in Thrissur, Kerala.

Kolkali is a folk art performed in Malabar region of Kerala, India. The dance performers move in a circle, striking small sticks and keeping rhythm with special steps. The circle expands and contracts as the dance progress. The accompanying music gradually rises in pitch and the dance reaches its climax. Kolkali is now a popular event in Kerala School Kalolsavam, which is considered as the biggest cultural event of Asia. There are two styles of Kolkali: the actual Kolkali and Thekkan Koladi. The actual Kolkali consists of Thacholikali, Rajasooyam etc. The actual kolkali is almost at verge of extinction and Thekkan Koladi is still alive as it is added in state kololsavams.

Many of the traditional performing art forms of Kerala like Kathakali, Velakali, Poorakkali and Thacholikali; Kolkali, also have drawn elements from Kalarippayatt during their stages of evolution. Kolkali has borrowed much from Kalarippayattu in its basic body preparative training of the actor not only in terms of technique in practice but also from the body massage for the trainee. Many of the body postures, choreography and foot work of the Kolkali characters are taken directly from Kalarippayattu.

The origin of the art can be traced back to ancient days when Kalarippayattu, a martial art of Kerala, was in vogue.

Kolkali performed in a college arts fest

== See also ==
- Arts of Kerala
