= Duffmuttu =

Indian art form

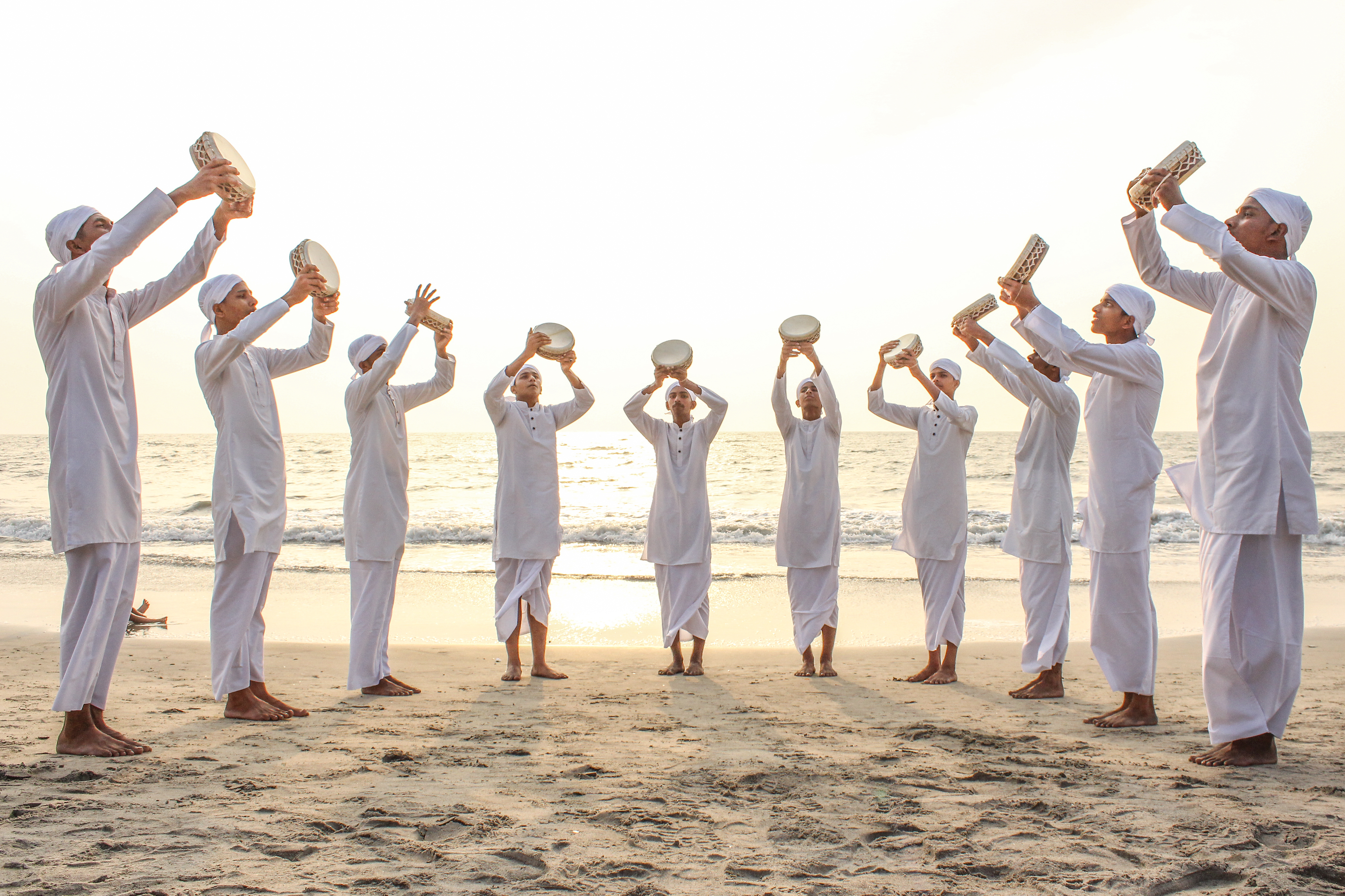
Duffmuttu Artists from Kerala

Duffmuttu (also: Dubhmuttu) is an art form prevalent in the Malabar region of the states of Kerala and Karnataka in south India. It derives its name from the duff, a percussion instrument made of wood and ox skin. The word duff is of Arabic origin and is also called a thappitta.

Duffmuttu is performed as social entertainment and to commemorate festivals, uroos (festivals connected with mosques) and weddings. Duffmuttu can be performed at any time of the day. A duffmuttu performance usually consists of ten members who stand or sit facing each other singing songs and swaying their bodies to the tempo of the song which is set by the rhythmic beats of the duff.

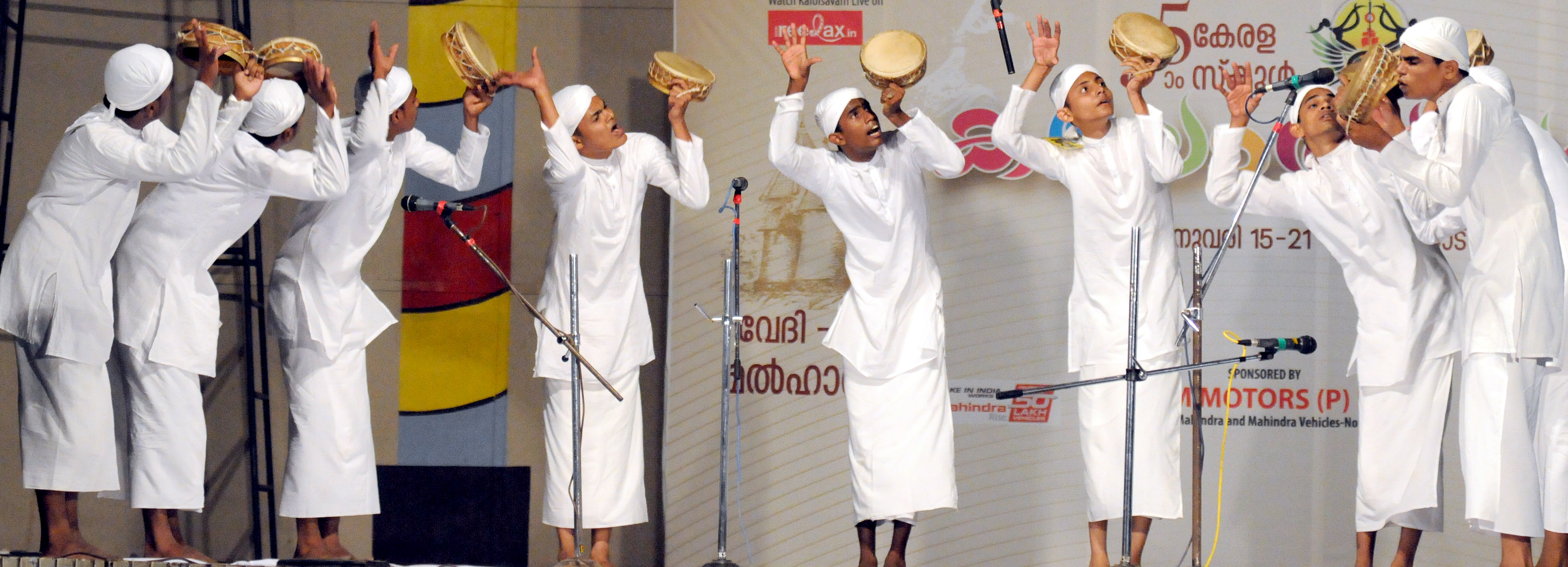
Duffmuttu Performance

Duffmuttu songs are a tribute to Islamic heroes and martyrs. The lead player also leads the troupe in song while the others provide the chorus. The dancers drum the duff with their fingers or palms and while moving rhythmically often toss them over their heads. A closely related art form is the Aravana Muttu or Arabana Muttu that uses a drum called arabana that is similar to the duff.

== Gallery ==
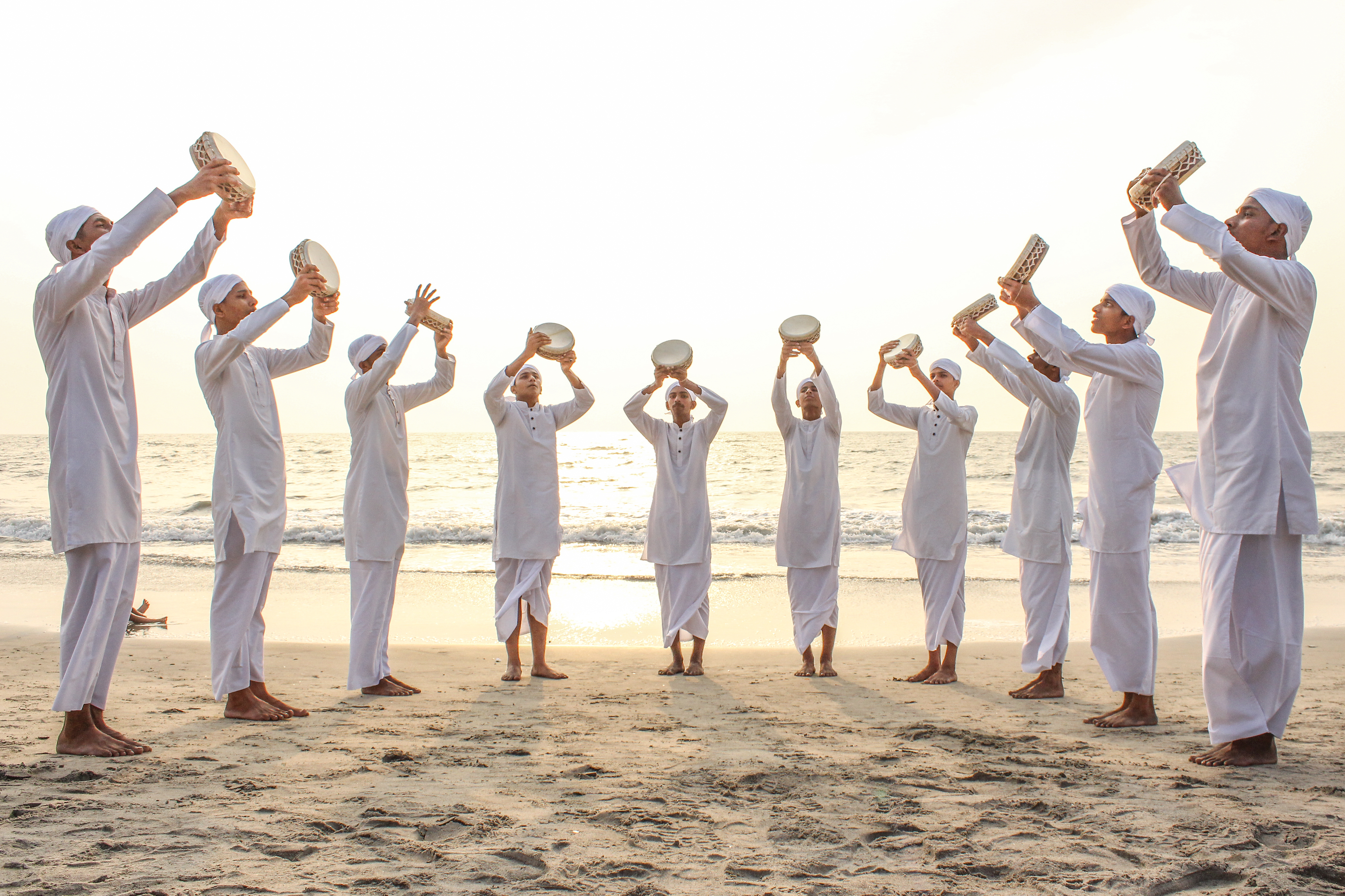
Young Duffmuttu Artists

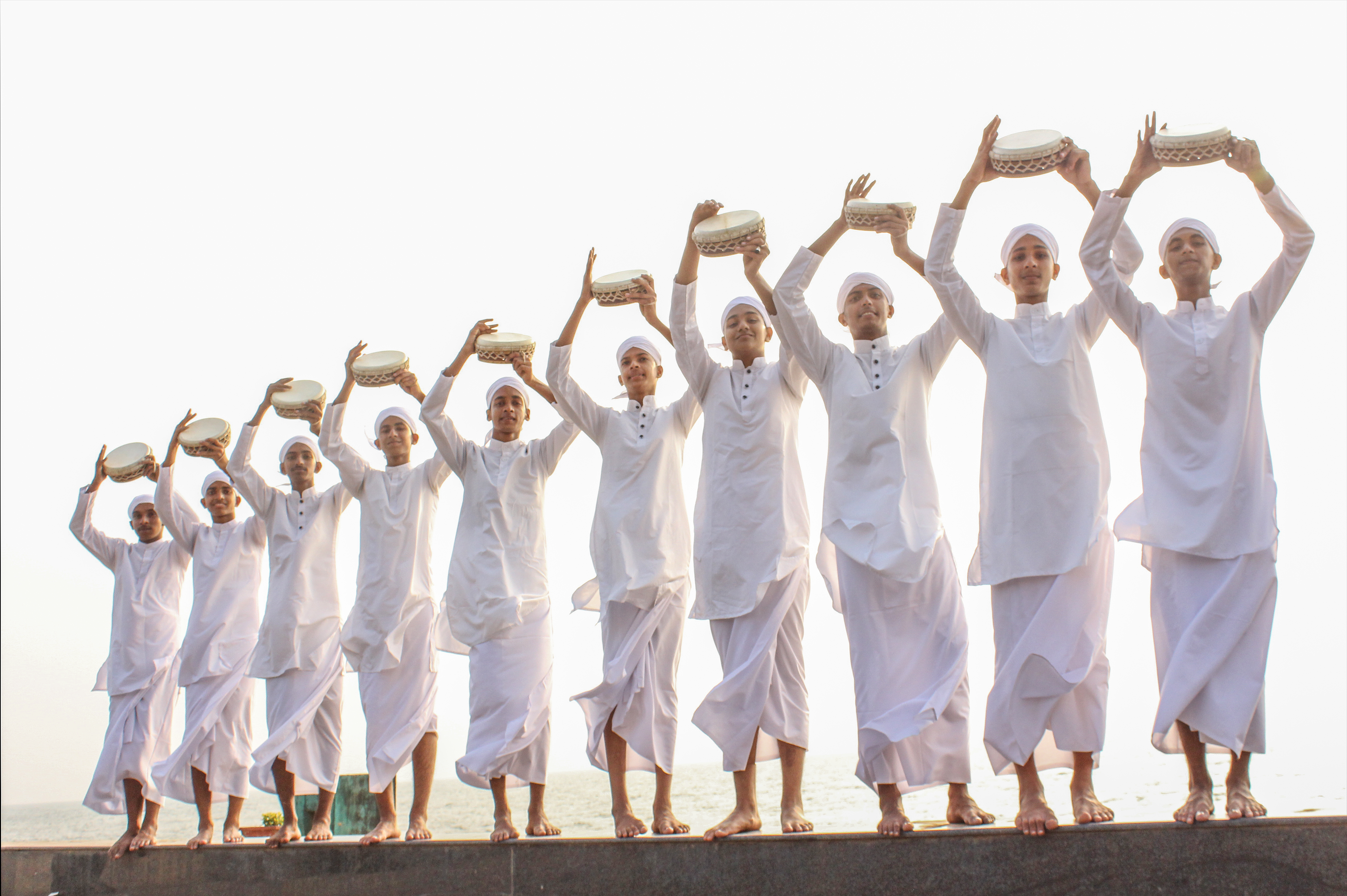
Duffmuttu Artists

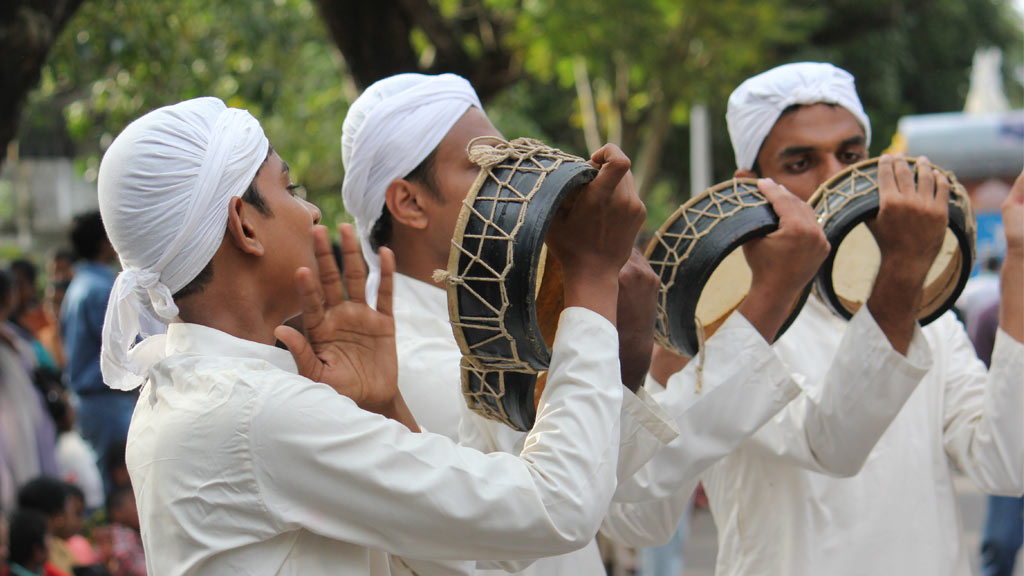
Duffmuttu

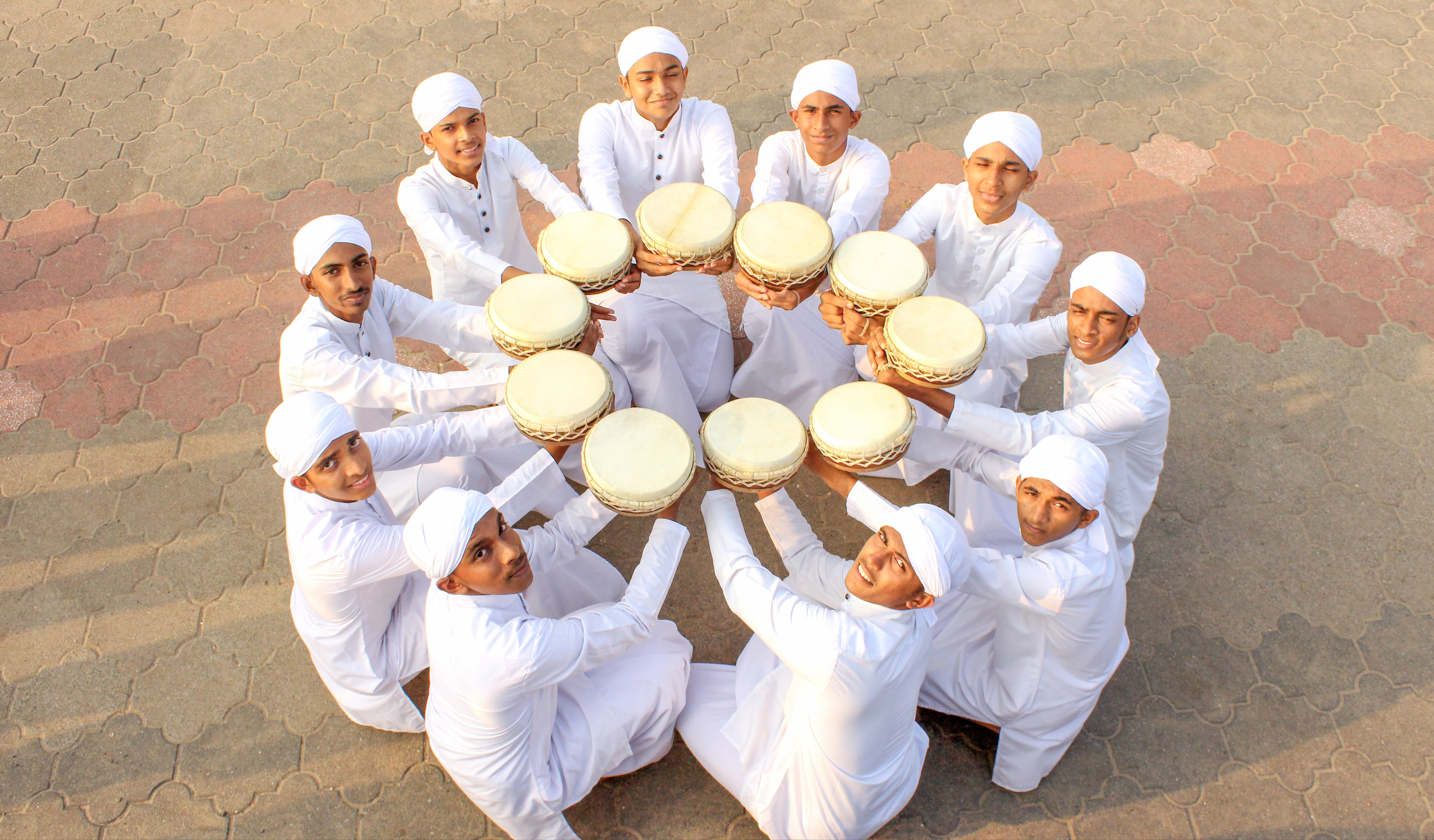
Young Duffmuttu Artists from Kerala School Kalolsavam

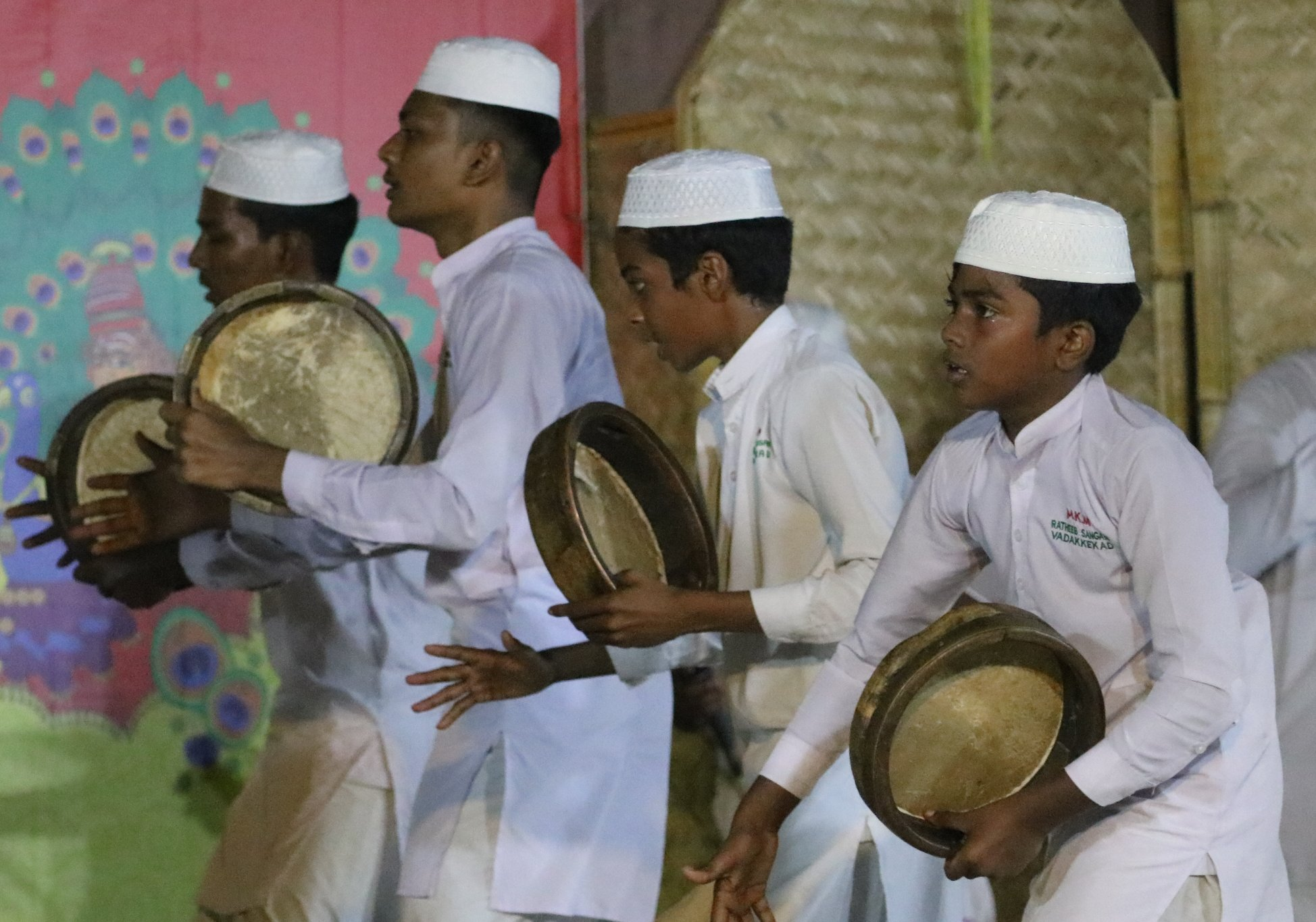
Traditional Duffmuttu

== See also ==
- Aravana muttu
- Kuthu Ratheeb
- Mappila
- Oppana
