= Arabi Malayalam =

Dialect of Malayalam used by Mappila Muslims

- Mappila Malayalam
- عَرَبِ مَلَیَاۻَمٛ
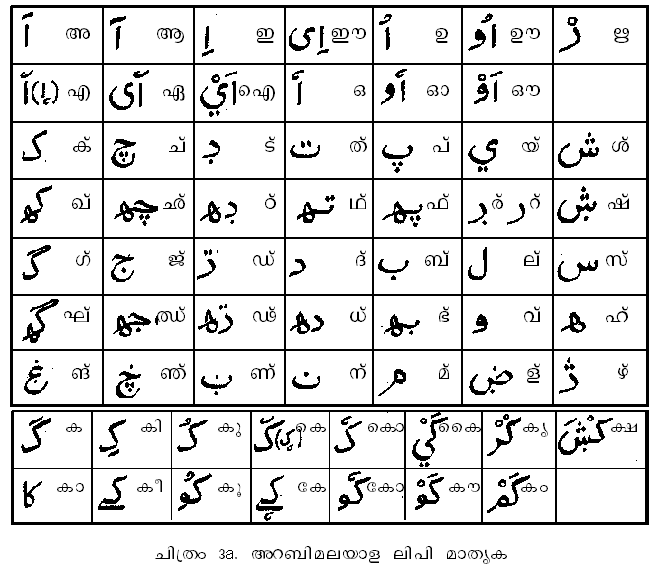
- Native to: India
- Native speakers: Malabar Muslims
- Language family: Dravidian: Southern; Southern I; Tamil–Kannada; Tamil–Kota; Tamil–Toda; Tamil–Irula; Tamil–Kodava–Urali; Tamil–Malayalam; Malayalamoid; Malayalam; Arabi Malayalam
- Early forms: Old Tamil: Middle Tamil
- Dialects: Byari (Beari)
- Writing system: Arabi Malayalam script

Language codes
- ISO 639-3: –
- Glottolog: mopl1237

Arabi Malayalam (also called Mappila Malayalam and Moplah Malayalam) is the traditional Malayalam dialect of the Mappila Muslim community. It is spoken by several thousand people, predominantly in the Malabar Coast of Kerala state, southern India. The form can be classified as a regional dialect in northern Kerala, or as a class or occupational dialect of the Mappila community. It can also be called a vernacular in general, or as a provincial patois, with the latter label being increasingly applicable in Colonial times. All the forms of Malayalam, including the Mappila dialect, are mutually intelligible.

The Mappila form shows some lexical admixture from Arabic and Persian.

The variety Arabi Malayalam is also used by lower castes non-Muslims in northern Kerala, Muslims in Dakshina Kannada, and different Mappila migrant communities in South East Asia.

== Writing system ==
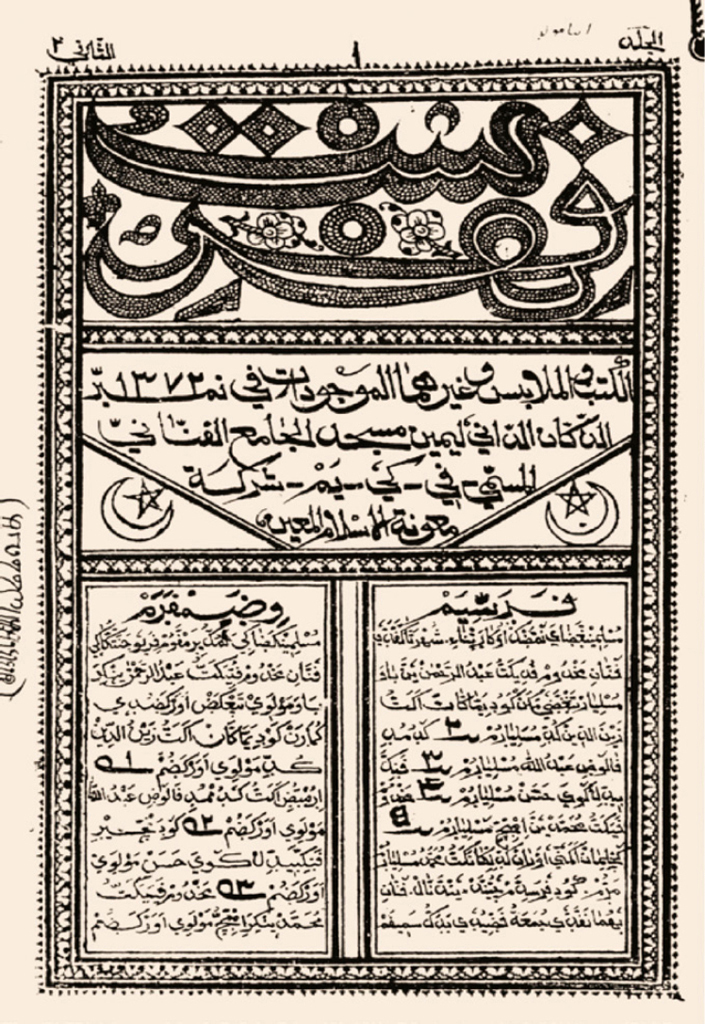
A multilingual advertisement with a catalogue of books and textiles available from a shop in Ponnani in 1908. Text on the left hand side is Arabi-Tamil, text on the right hand side, Arabi Malayalam script

The Arabi Malayalam script is an Abjad. The script is also known as Khatafunnani or Ponnani script. It is also used to write several minority languages such as Eranadan and Jesri.

Arabi Malayalam came into being as Malayalam written in the Arabic script. The Malayalam language was mainly used to spread the ideas and practices of Islam in Kerala. Creating Arabi Malayalam made it easier for the Arabs who migrated to Kerala to spread the religion without a language barrier getting in the way.

== Study center ==
Malayalam University has been set up as a centre for studies of Arabi Malayalam language at Tirur.

== See also ==
- Arabi Malayalam script
- Suriyani Malayalam
- Arwi
- Byari dialect
- Eranadan language
- Jasri
