= Aravana muttu =

Art form of Kerala

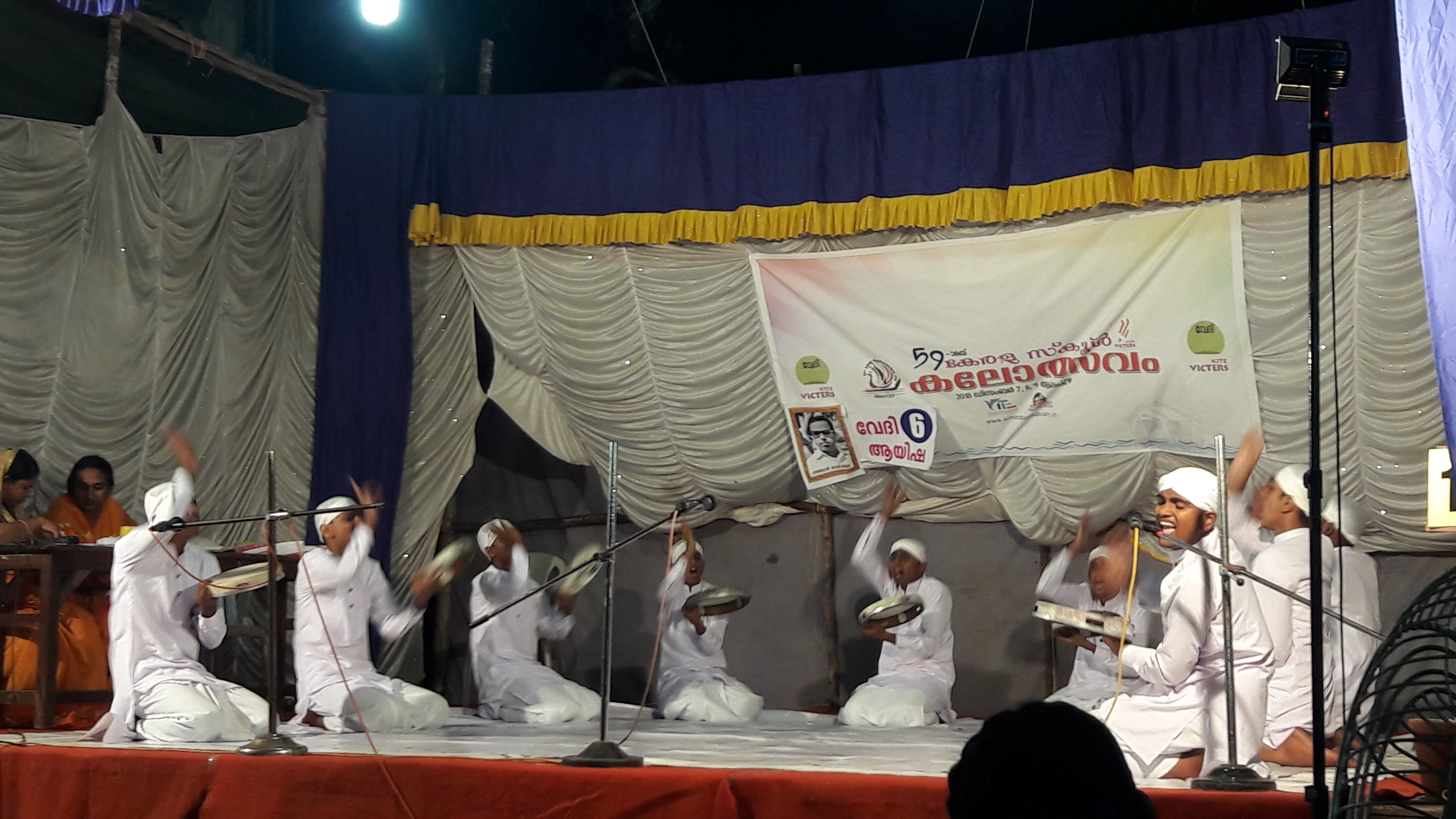
Arabana muttu at 59th school kalolsavam, Aalappuzha

Aravana muttu or arabana muttu is an art form prevalent among Muslims in Kerala state of south India, named after the aravana, a hand-held, one-sided flat tambourine or drumlike musical instrument, derived from Arabia. It is made of wood and animal skin, similar to the duff but a little thinner and bigger. In the opinion of Becker Edakkazhiyur, a noted arabana musician, "the ritualistic performance of `Arabana Reefa Ee Raathib Muttu' has been mistaken for `Arabana Kali Muttu,' which is purely for entertainment. While the former is almost extinct, the latter, known for its aesthetic appeal, is the one presented nowadays."

The arabana muttu, which is performed to welcome dignitaries, is a more difficult art than the duff muttu. There are traditional and modern methods of playing the aravana. Traditionally, with participants sitting in a semicircle, the leader of the group will start singing. When the initial song is over, the players will start to play following the song of the leader and beating on the aravana musically; others will beat in the same way by giving chorus to the song.

Even though the duff and Aravana are two different types of arts, the word duff is used interchangeably for Aravana, because the duff is more familiar than the Aravana. This art is nowadays the basis for competitions in Kerala.

== See also ==
- Duff muttu
- Kuthu Ratheeb
- Mappila
- Mappila Paattu
- Oppana
