= Srambia =

Type of mosque in Kerala, India

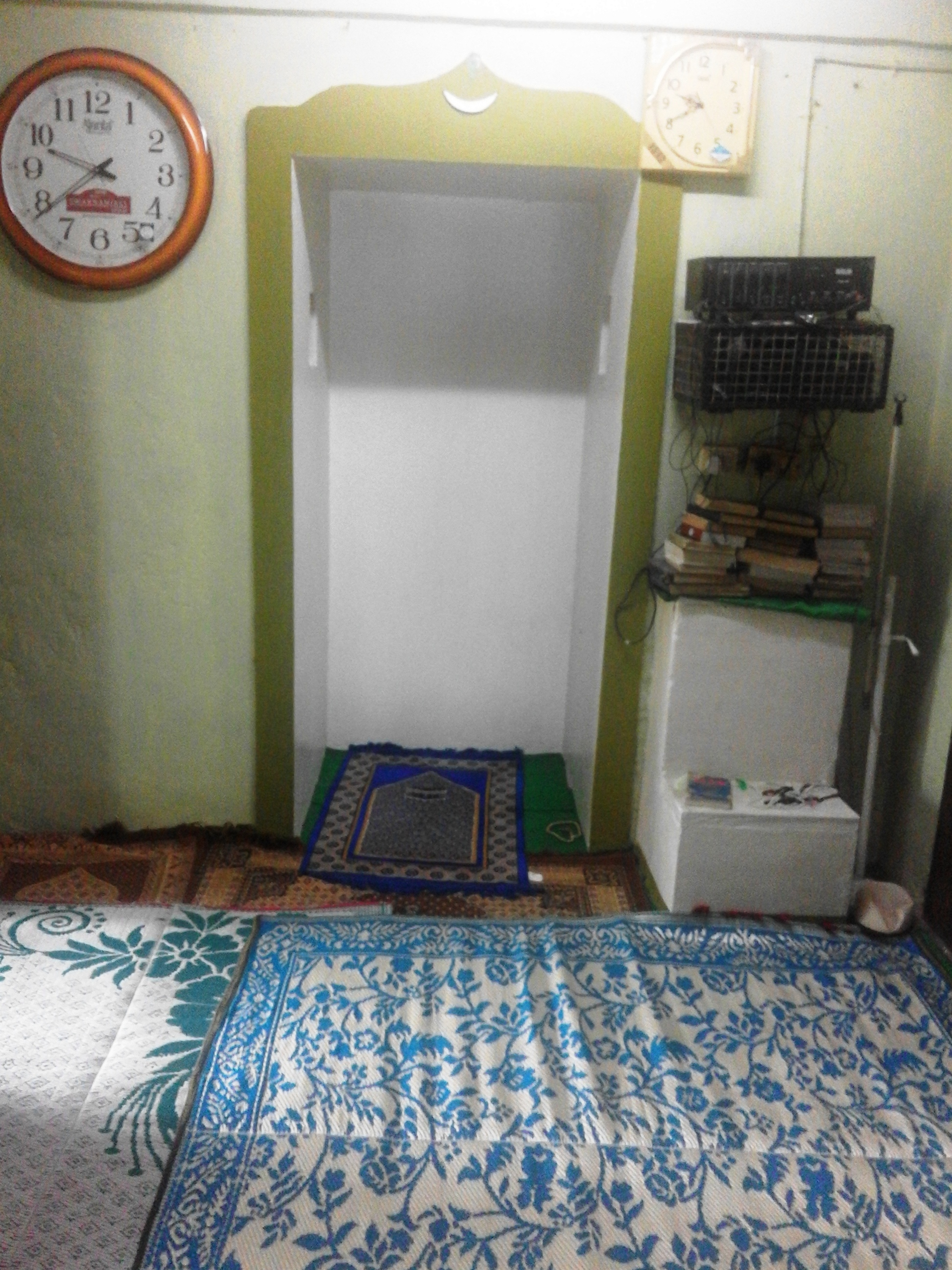
The mihrab of the Panamaram Srambia

A srambia or niskarappalli is a kind of small mosque, built in the Kerala architectural style, found in the state of Kerala, India. A srambia is distinguished by the smallness and antique value of the property. Very often the architecture is also unique. Often, the srambias were built by a single family or hamlet. Many of the srambias are very old and preserved with great care and passion.

== Overview ==
The unique features of a srambia include its very small size, extensive use of timber in the building's construction, often located in a paddy field, and have access to a body of water, such as a pond.

Many of the srambias are threatened by the threat of modernization as people ignorant of their importance are razing them and replacing them with concrete structures.

== Notable srambias ==
- Utharam Palli, Ettammel, Madayi, Kannur District
- Pucholamad Cheroor Srambia, Vengara, Malappuram
- Puzhakkara Srambia, Chaliyam, Calicut
- Mundathot Thamarakkulam Srambia, Thalakkattoor, Ozhur, Malappuram

== Gallery ==
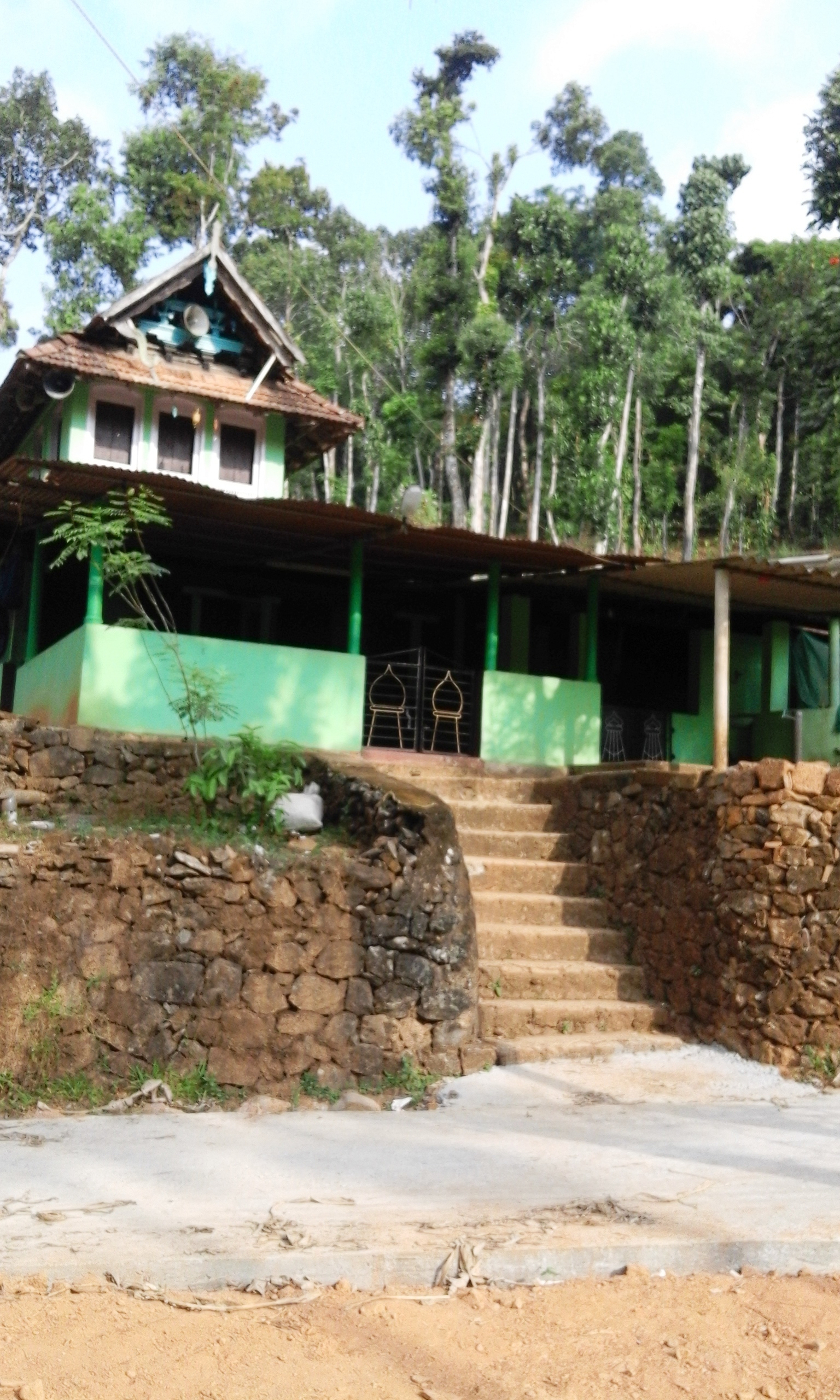
Thazhe Periya Srambia, Thalappuzha, Wayanad

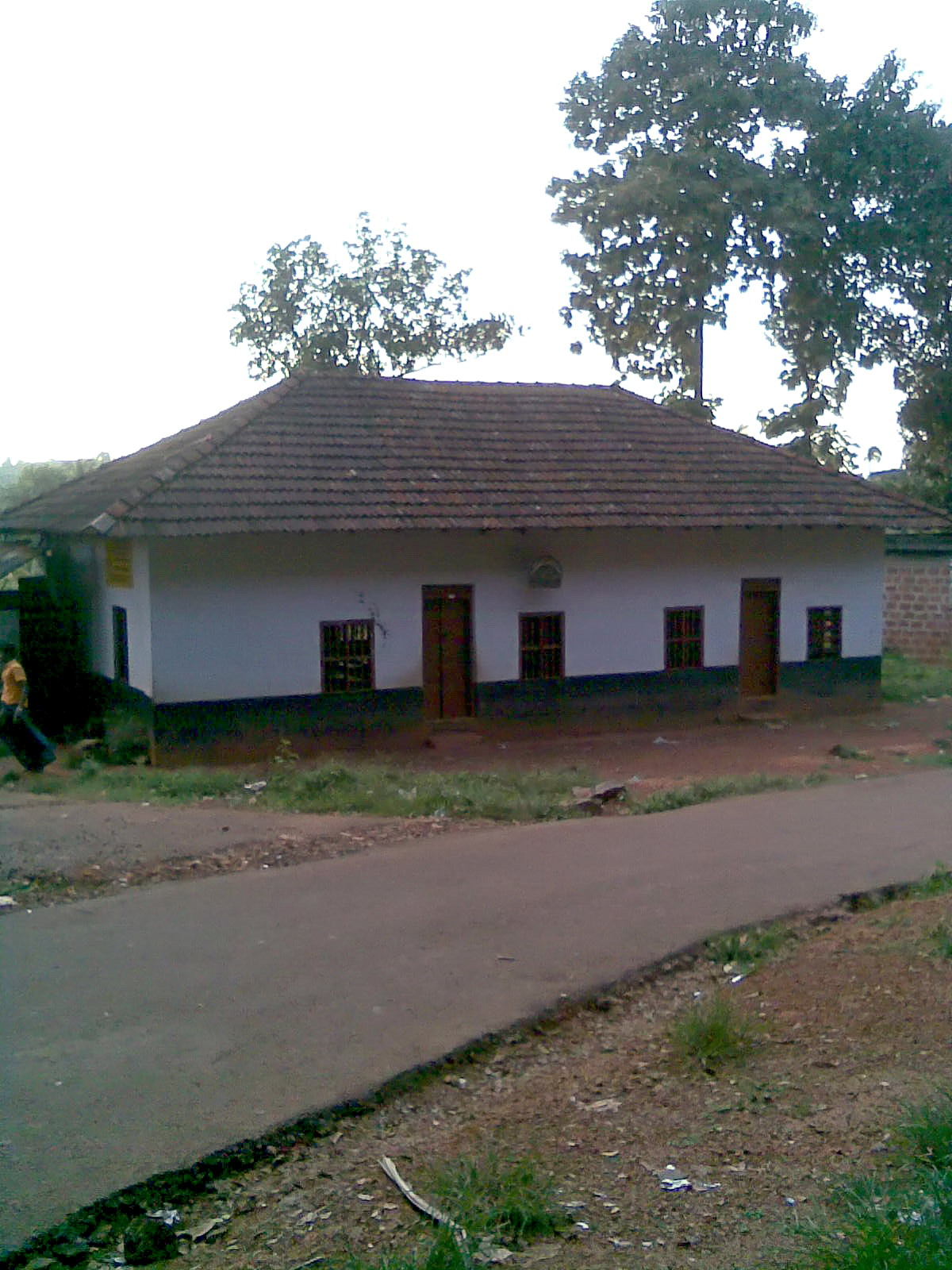
Vadakkuparamba Srambia, Mudikkod

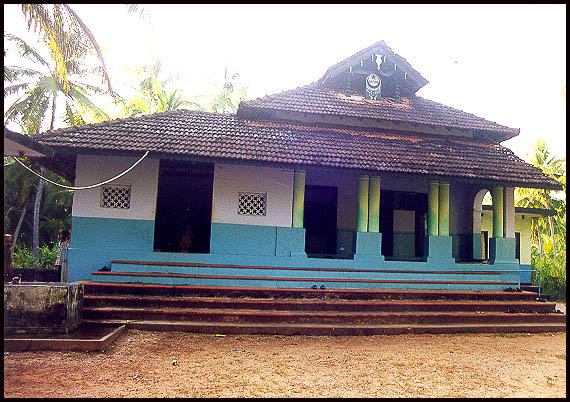
Utharam Srambia, Ettammal, Madayi

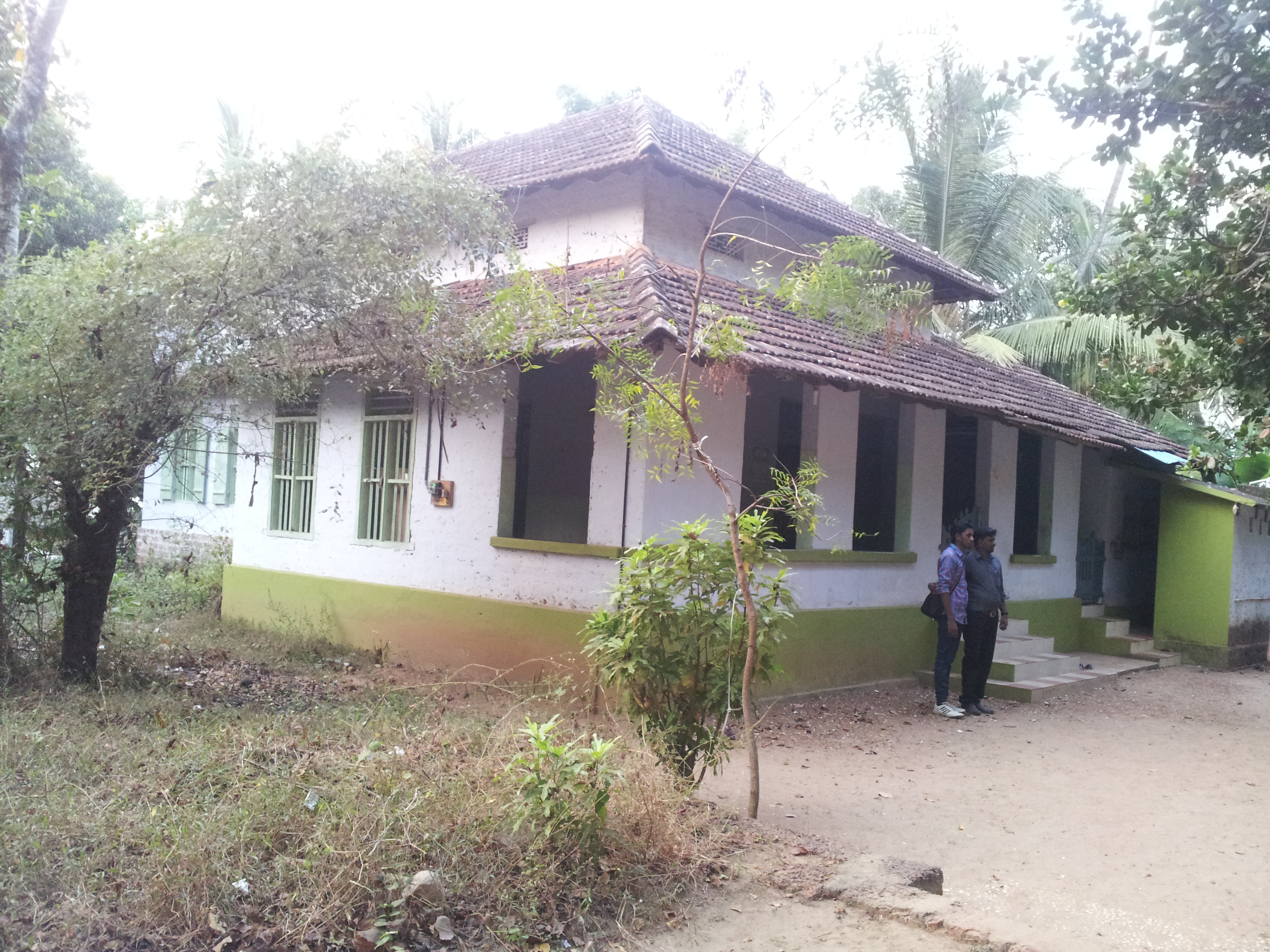
Puzhakkara Srambia, Chaliyam, Calicut

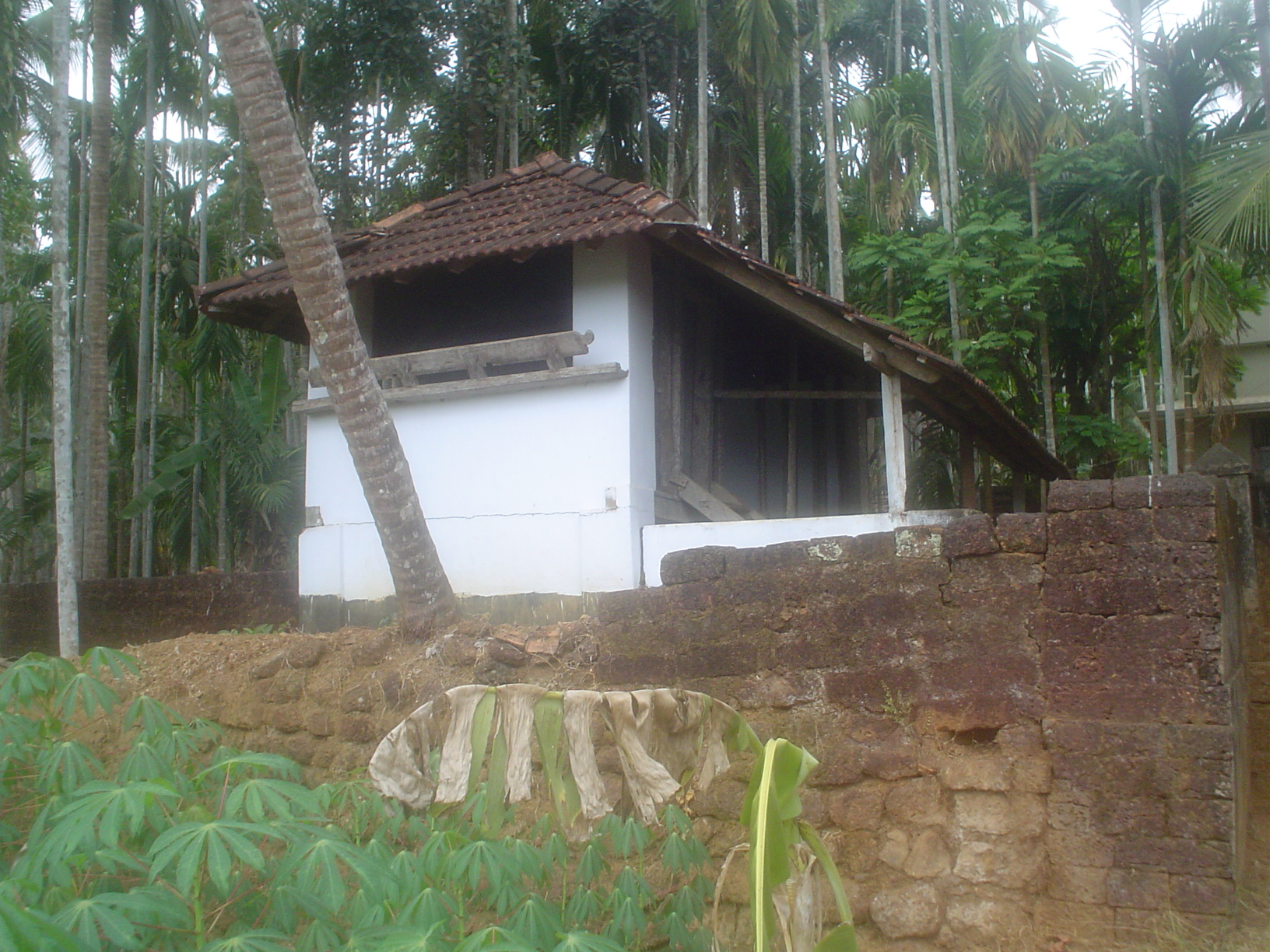
Poocholamadu Cheroor Srambia in Vengara is built on a pond

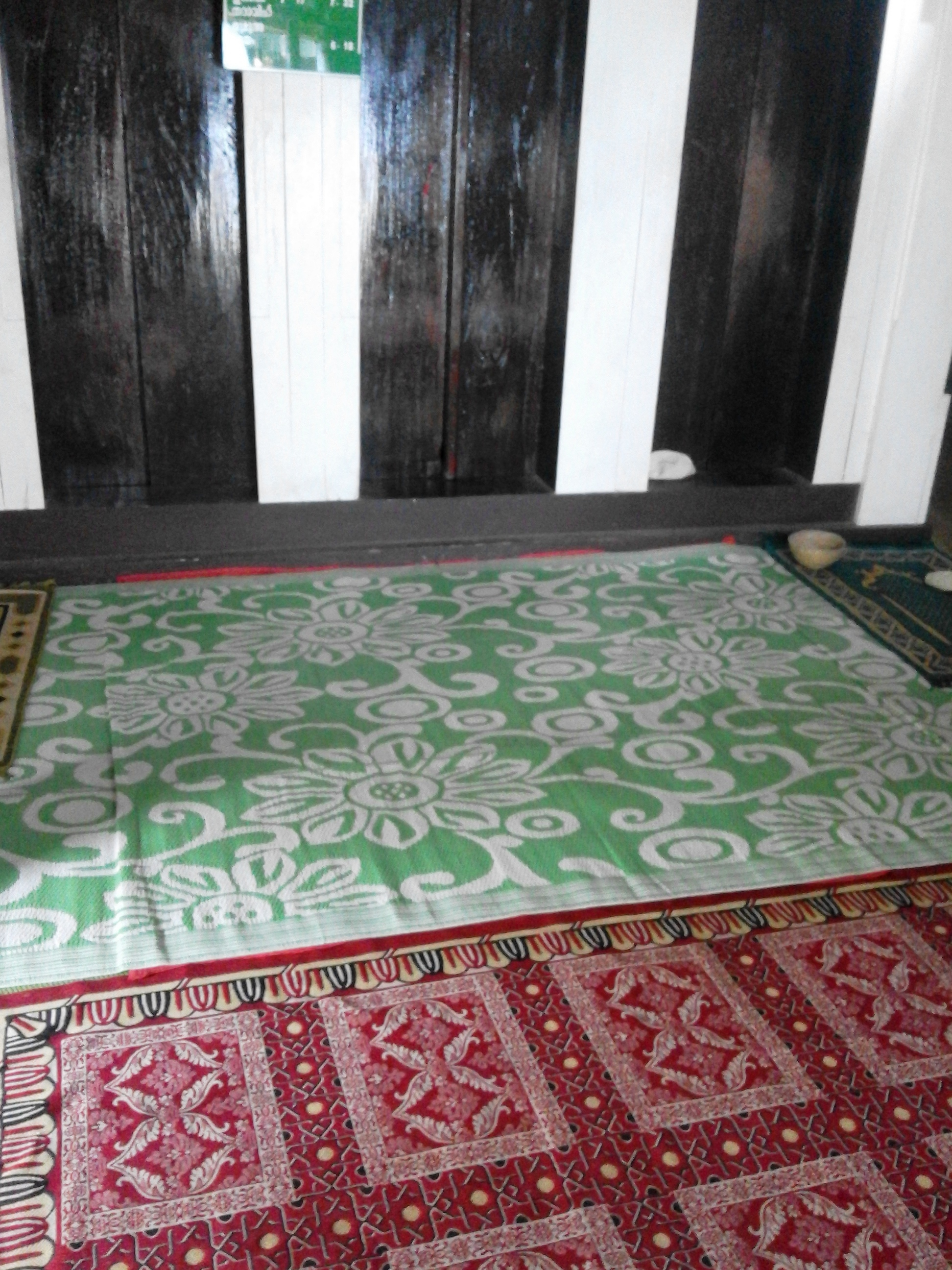
Inside the Panamaram Srambia

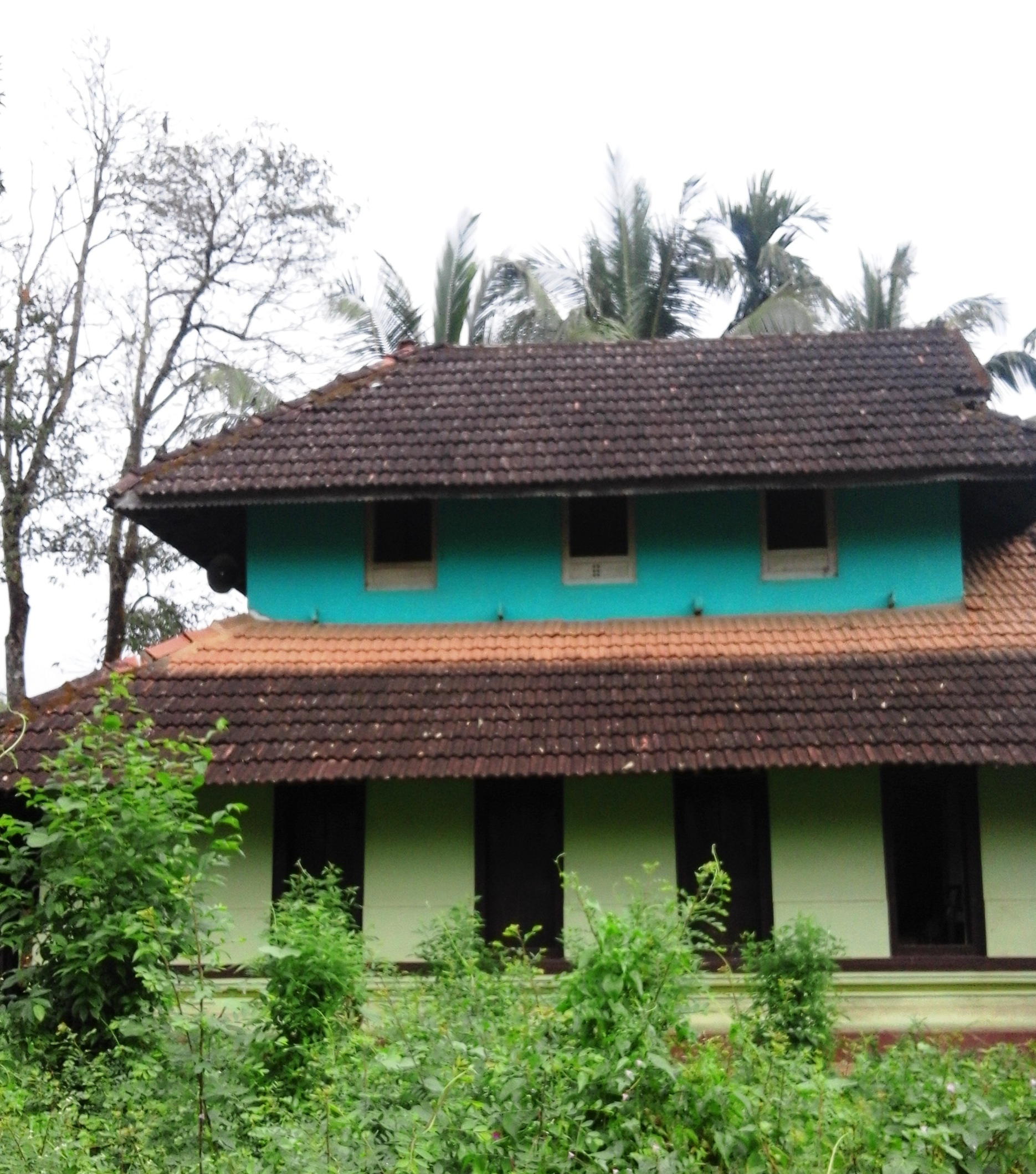
Panamaram Srambia

== See also ==
- Islam in India
- List of mosques in India
- List of mosques in Kerala
