= Muttumpuram =

- village
- Interactive map of Muttumpuram
- Coordinates: 11.067207°N 75.977052°E
- Postal code: 676304
- Area codes: 0494245, 0494249
- Vehicle registration: KL-
- Website: www.muttumpuram.webs.com

Muttumpuram is a small village in Vengara, Malappuram district, Kerala state of India. Most part of Muttumpuram is included in Kannamangalam Panchayath. In the village there is a small town to fulfill the needs of living people. The city is border of some wards of Kannamangalam panchayath and Vengara Panchayath. The village is included in Vengara Assembly constituency and Malappuram Lokhasabha constituency.

== Geography ==
Muttumpuram is 2.5 km away from Vengara town and 1.6 km from achanambalam town. The village share its boundaries with Poocholamad on east, with Gandhikunnu on south, with Poonkadaya on west and with Padapparambu on north (these are small villages). Geographically Muttumpuram is a Plane place some parts useful to agriculture.

== People ==
Most of the people in the village are ordinary villagers. Government employees are a few in number. The source of income of people is from the family members employed in Gulf countries, daily wage work, and coolie. Other occupations include retail business and agriculture.

== Transportation ==
Muttumpuram is 4.6 km away from NH17 (kooriyad) and 2.5 km from Vengara. There is a bus service from vengara and Kunnumpuram. Nearest airport is Calicut International Airport, it is 12 km away and railway station is Parappanangadi, it is 15 km away from the village.
