= Poocholamad =

Coordinates: 11.0672°N 75.9771°E

- village
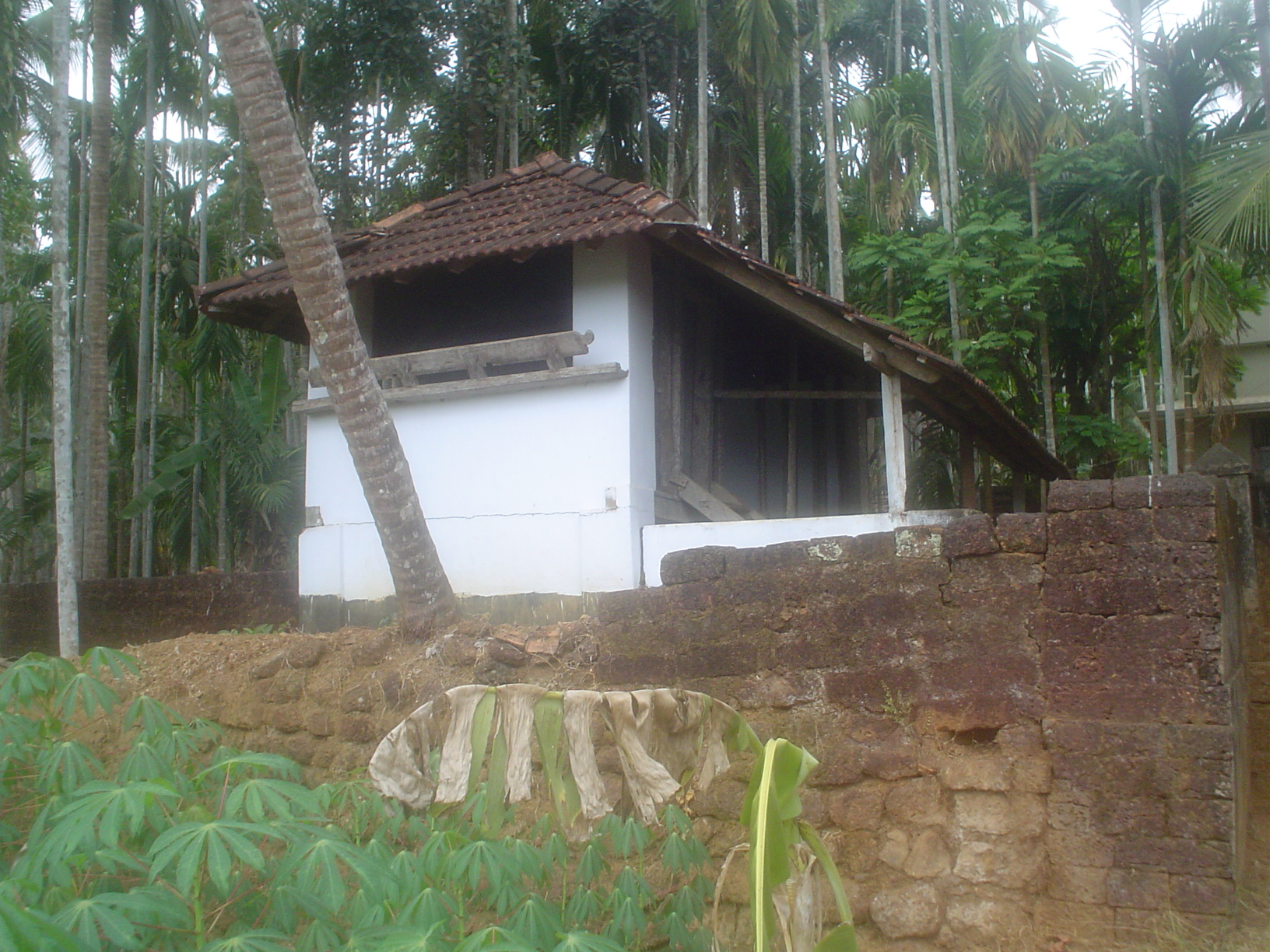
- Poocholamadu Cheroor Srambia
- Interactive map of Poocholamad
- Country: India
- State: Kerala
- District: Malappuram

Languages
  - Official: Malayalam, English
- Time zone: UTC+5:30 (IST)
- PIN: 676 314,676 318
- Telephone code: 0494
- Vehicle registration: KL-
- Nearest city: Vengara, Kottakkal
- Climate: moderate (Köppen)

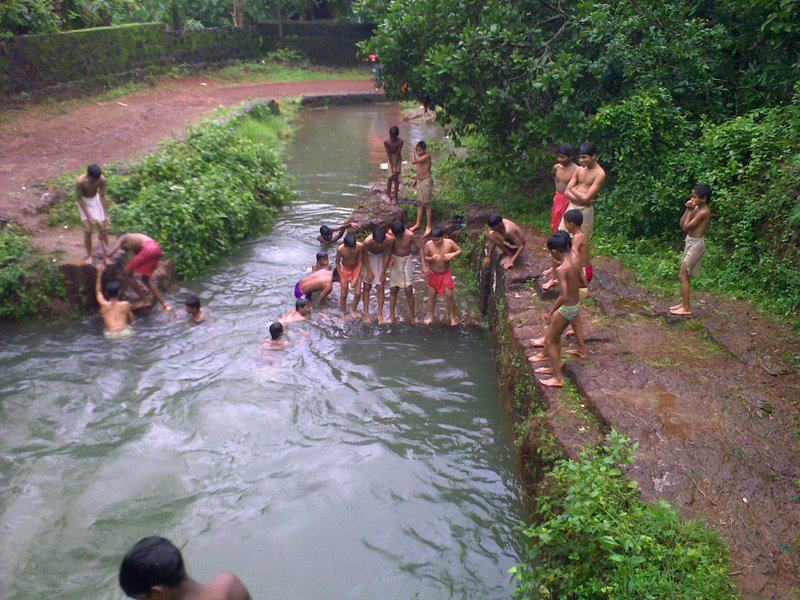
Puthankulam, Poocholamad

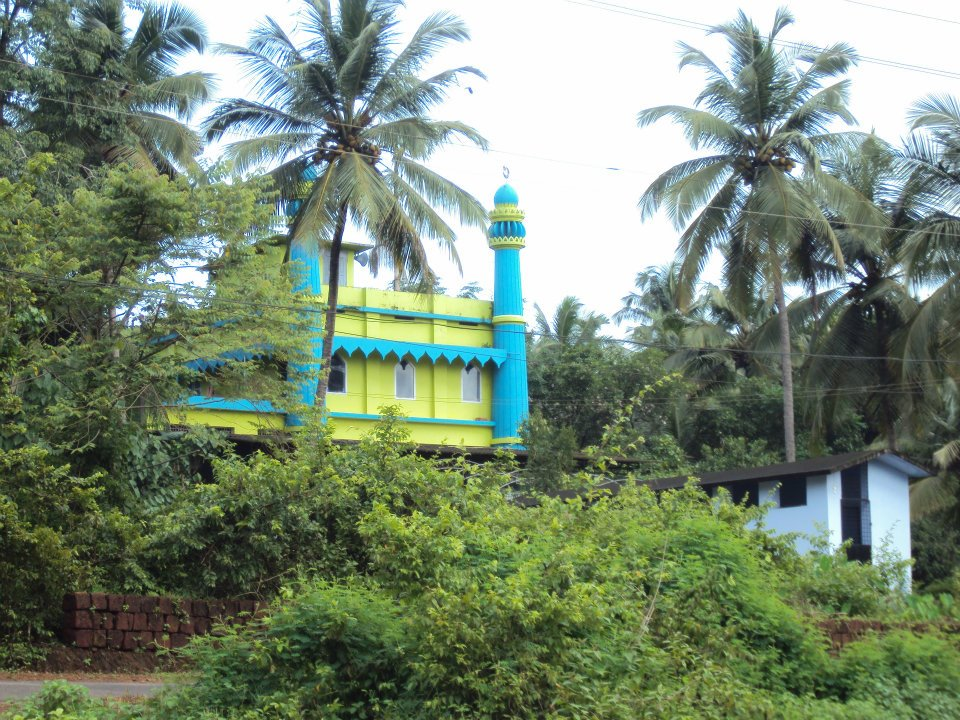
Juma Masjidh, Poochalamad

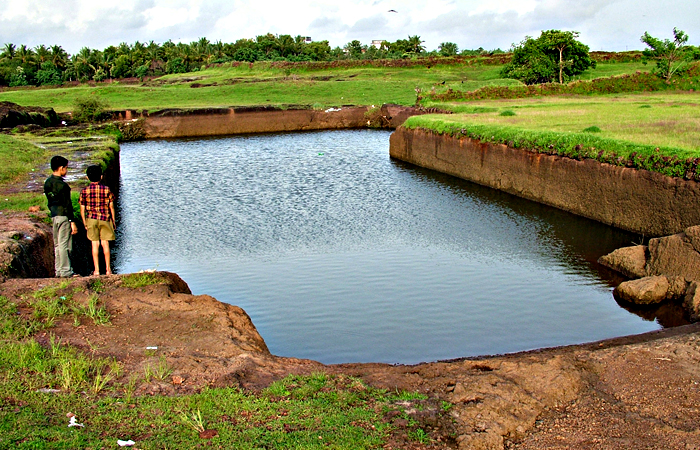
Narankulam, Poocholamad

Poocholamad is a village in Kannamangalam in the Malappuram district, state of Kerala, India. It is part of the Gram Panchayat government. It is also included in Vengara Assembly constituency and Malappuram Lokhasabha constituency.

== Geography ==
Poocholamad is 2.065 km away from Vengara and 1.36816 km from Achanambalam town. The village shares borders with Cheroor on the east side, Vettuthod, Gandhikunnu on the south side, Muttumpuram on the west side, and Achanambalam on the northside (these are small villages).

== Transportation ==
Poocholamad is 7 km away from NH17 (Kakkad) and 2 km from Vengara. There is some bus service from Vengara and Kunnumpuram. The nearest airport is Calicut International Airport, 15 km away. There is a railway station in Parappanangadi, 20 km away from the village. The capital city is Malappuram, located 17 km away from the village. The nearest university is Calicut University, 16 km away.

== Educational institutions in Poocholamad ==
- Government Lower Primary School Nottappuram
- Misbahul Islam Madrassa
- Poocholamad Anganwadi high school

=== Schools near Poocholamad ===
- G.M.U.P School, Kannamangalam(Achanambalam)
- P.P.T.M.Y.High School, Cherur
- Govt. Girls High School, Vengara

=== Colleges near Poocholamad ===
- P.S.M.O. College, Tirurangadi
- E.M.E.A college, Kondotty
- Government College, Malappuram

== Places of worship ==
- Poocholamad Juma Masjid
- Thonniyil Shiva Temple

== Special attractions ==
- Nharan Kulam (Pond)
- Thazhathe Kulam
- Puthan Kulam

== Culture ==
Poocholamadu village is a predominantly Muslim populated area. Hindus exist in comparatively smaller numbers. The culture of the locals is based upon Muslim traditions. Duffmuttu, Kolkali, and Aravana muttu are common folk arts of this locality. There are many libraries attached to mosques giving a rich source of Islamic studies. Most of the books are written in Arabi-Malayalam which is a version of the Malayalam language written in Arabic script. People gather in mosques for their evening prayer and remain sitting after the prayers discussing social and cultural issues. Business and family issues are also sorted out during these evening meetings. The Hindu minority of this area keeps their rich traditions by celebrating various festivals in their temples. Hindu rituals are done here with a regular devotion like other parts of Kerala.

== Transportation ==
Poocholamadu connects to other parts of India through Parappanangadi town. National Highway 66 passes through Ramanattukara and the northern stretch connects to Goa and Mumbai. The southern stretch connects to Cochin and Trivandrum. State Highway 28 starts from Nilambur and connects to Ooty, Mysore, and Bangalore through Highways 12, 29, and 181. The nearest airport is at Kozhikode. The nearest major railway station is at Parappanangadi.
