= Vengara Gram Panchayat =

Gram Panchayat in Malappuram district of Kerala, India

Vengara Grama Panchayat is grama panchayat in Malappuram district, Kerala, India. It is situated in Vengara village in Thiroorangadi taluk. This panchayat was the largest panchayat in Malappuram district and was divided into Vengara and Kannamangalam in 1999-2000 year. The current geographical area of the panchayat is 18.66 km^{2} . Though 70% of people in the panchyat depends upon agriculture, the income source is overseas jobs. N.T. Abdul Nazer serves as the President of the Vengara Grama Panchayat from 27th December 2025

== History ==
Vengara panchayat is situated 16 km away from Malappuram district headquarters. There were separate panchayats existed between 1954–55 in the Valiyora and Kannamangalam portions of the Malabar District Board. There were no elections conducted for president of panchayat during that time. The panchayat president was elected by the voters by raising their hands.

=== Formation of Panchayat ===
Vengara panchayat was constituted on 11 December 1961 by including Vengara, Kannamangalam villages and by merging Valiyora and Kannamangalam panchayats. This was headquartered at Vengara. There were 11 wards at the initial time. The first election was in 1964. Shri. Chakkeri Ahmed Kutti Sahib who later became the Minister of Education in Government of Kerala served as the first president.

=== Partition ===
For many geographical and demographic reasons, the development process of Vengara Panchayat was more in Vengara when comparing to other places in the panchayat. Due to the low population density of Kannamangalam, it did not achieve significant development until 1995. Due to this, government divided this panchayat into Vengara and Kannamangalam on 2 December 2000. In the next election, Shri. Kallan Muhammed and Shri. K Saitalavi was elected as the President and vice president respectively.

== First governing body ==
The first governing body was elected for 1964–69 years. Chakkiri Ahmed Kutti was the president and the other members are as follows:

- P. P. Mohammed Kutty
- P Moideenkutty
- TK Muhammad
- A. Kunjali Haji
- Maliyakeel Abdullah Haji
- A. Kunjikoya Kutty
- Paranjodham Kunjimohaji
- K.K. T Mohammed Haji
- V. K Ahmed Kutty Haji

== Boundaries ==
- North: Kannamangalam Panchayat
- South: Parapur panchayat, Kadalundi River
- East : Oorakam panchayat
- West :A. R. Nagar Panchayat

== Wards ==
Panchayat currently comprises 23 wards:

- Kolapuram East
- Kuttur North
- Poonkoodaya
- KUTTUR SOUTH
- Balikkad
- Kannadippatti
- Gandhikunnu
- Vengara Town
- Nelliparamba
- Areakulam
- Kuruvilkandu
- Chenakkal
- Manchemmad
- Puthanangadi
- Muthalamadu
- Adaykapura
- Pandikashala
- Mannilpulakkal
- Kacherippadi
- Parampilpati
- Pangattukandu
- Pathummochi
- Kooriyad

== Education ==
The people in panchayat majorly focused in religional education along with general education. Several persons worked for the education here. The most prominent among them were Chakkiri Ahmed Kutti.

=== History of education ===
Until 1958, there were only 13 LP schools with 5th standard and one higher elementary school with 8th standard in the panchayat. The first Kerala government led by E. M. S. Namboodiripad granted a high school to Vengara in 1958. Due to the lack of suitable space to build a school in Vengara this school was set up in Neduparamba in Orakam Panchayath. This school is still known as Vengara school.

=== Educational institutions ===
There are six LP schools, four UP schools, one Higher Secondary School and one Vocational Higher Secondary School in Vengara Panchayath. Out of these, one LP school, two UP schools and one vocational higher secondary school are in the government sector. The rest are under private management. There are also some unaided schools and a few parallel colleges situated in here.

==== Schools ====
There are several schools in this panchayat including.

1. GLPS Thattancherimala
2. AMLPS Kuttoor south
3. AMLPS Valiyora
4. AMLPS Vengara
5. AHMLPS Kuttoor
6. SULPS Kuttor
7. GUPS Karuaka
8. GUPS Valiyora
9. AMUPS Valiyora east
10. PMSAMUPS Vengara
11. GGVHSS Vengara
12. KMHSS Kuttoor North

== Hospitals ==
There are several hospitals nestles in Vengara panchayat in both public and private sector

- Govt Ayurveda hospital
- Community Health Centre
- IPP Sub centre Valiyora
- IPP Sub centre Pakkadapuraya
- Al Salama Hospital
- Vengara Nursing home
- Noufa Hospital

== Transportation ==
In the past, the main means of transport were the oxen and the boat. Now, the Malappuram Parappanangadi road runs through the town of Vengara. NH-17 passes through the boundary of Vengara Panchayat.

== See also ==
- Vengara, Malappuram district
- Kannamangalam, Malappuram
