= Chaliyam =

- Village
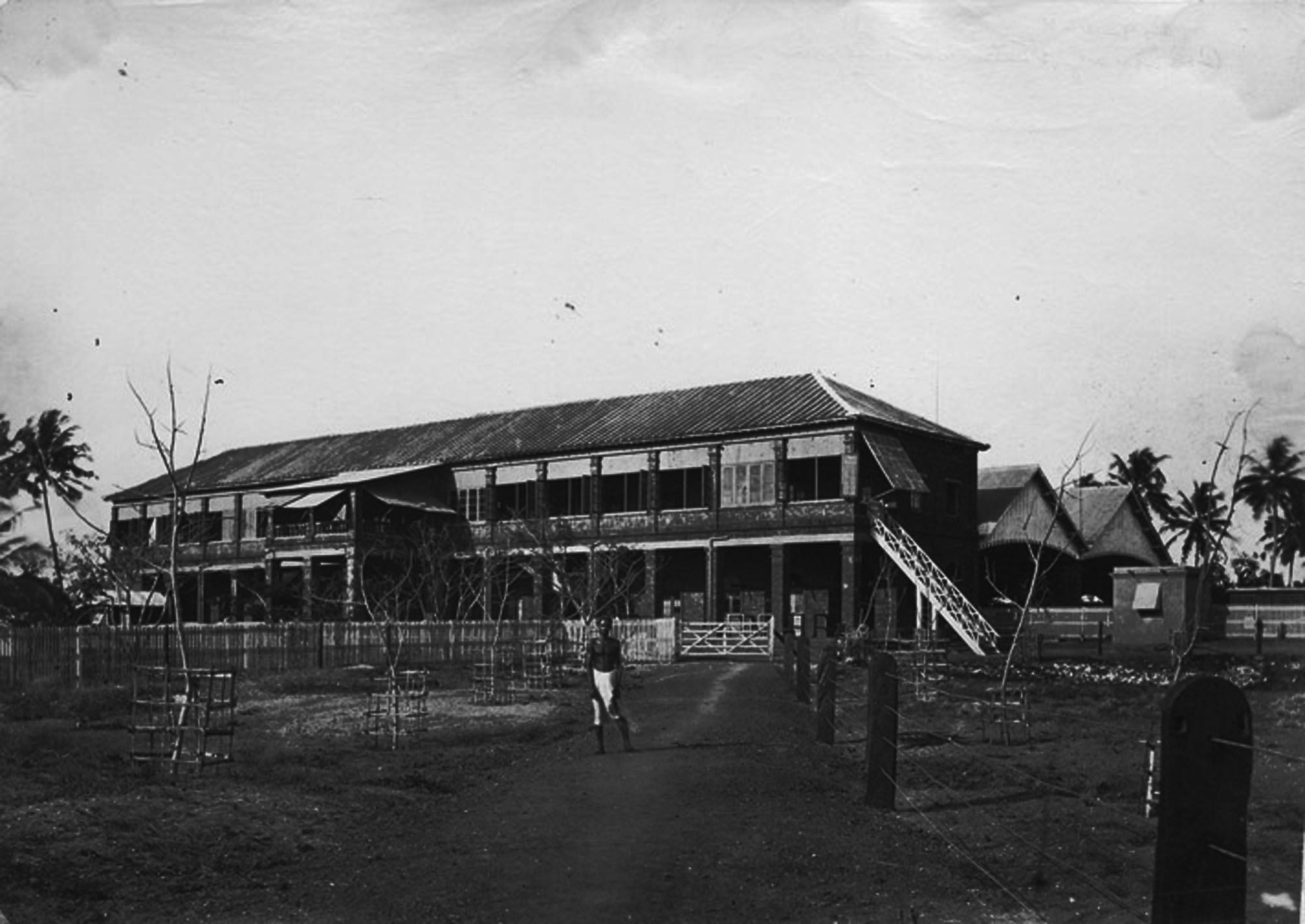
- Beypore Railway Station, incorrectly named, at Chaliyam was the terminus of the Madras Railway (South-West Line).

- Location in Kerala, India
- Coordinates: 11.15592°N 75.80824°E
- Country: India
- State: Kerala
- District: Kozhikode
- Taluk: Kozhikode
- Block panchayat: Kozhikode
- STD Code: 0495
- Postal Code: 673301
- Lok Sabha constituency: Kozhikode

Chaliyam is a village situated at the estuary of Chaliyar (River Beypore) in Kozhikode district of Kerala, India. Chaliyam forms an island, bounded by the Chaliyar in the north, and River Kadalundi in south, and the Conolly Canal in the east. It is located just opposite to Beypore port. Chaliyam (Beypore Railway Station) was the former terminus of the South-West Line of the Madras Railway. Chaliyam is the birthplace of Imam Shihabuddeen Ahmed Koya Shaliyathi. Chaliyam is also famous for the Guinness World Records holder Muhammed Adil, a P.M. who covered around seven km in the Chaliyar River with his hands and legs tied with ropes.

Different names of Chaliyam:

- Muslim navigators: al-Shaliat Chaliyam, a small port south of Kozhikode at the time, is not regularly mentioned under this name in the Arabic and Persian geographical literature. It does feature in Abu al-Fida's Taqwin al-Buldan (14th century). Two 14th-century Islamic tombstones are recorded at the site.
- European navigators: Chale/Challe/Chalia or Chaly
- Saliyam: the home of the Saliya community. The Saliyas figure as the dominant weaving community in medieval South India. Presently, the Chaliya (Chaliyan or Saliya) is an Other Backward Class in Kerala.

Chaliyam is believed to be one of the locations of the founding mosques of Kerala. As per this tradition, the qazi of the mosque established at Chaliyam was Taqy ud-Din. Ibn Batutah seems to have visited Chaliyam in the 14th century. He describes the settlement: "I next came to the city of Shaliat, where the Shaliats are made and hence they derive their name. This is a fine city..." The first railway line in Kerala was laid in 1861 from Tirur to Chaliyam through Tanur, Parappanangadi, Vallikkunnu, and Kadalundi.

Some sources allude to the presence of Jewish settlements (12th and 13th centuries) in Chaliyam.

As per a peace agreement between Portuguese Viceroy Nuno da Cunha and the Samutiri of Kozhikode, a Portuguese fort was constructed at Chaliyam in 1531. The Fort Chaliyam was eventually besieged, captured and destroyed by the Kozhikode forces in 1571. A certain Portuguese officer called Attaide was in charge of the fort at this time.

Chaliyam is also famous for the Khalasi.

Beypore Railway Station, incorrectly named, at Chaliyam was the terminus of the Madras Railway (South-West Line).

== History ==
Names, routes and locations of the Periplus of the Erythraean Sea (1st century CE)

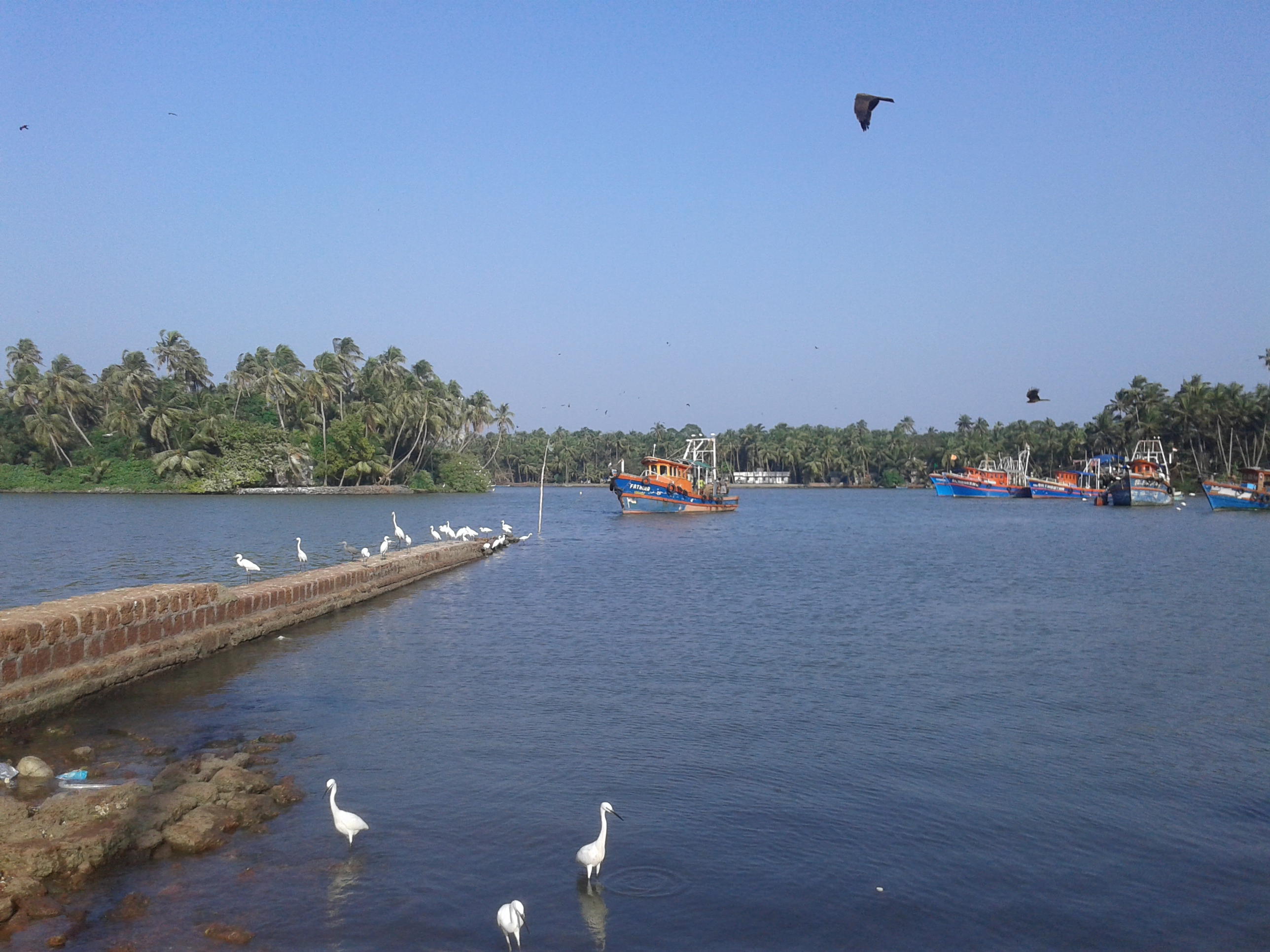
Chaliyam harbour

The ancient maritime port of Tyndis is identified with Kadalundi-Chaliyam-Beypore region. Tyndis was a major center of trade, second only to Muziris, between the Cheras and the Roman Empire. Pliny the Elder (1st century CE) states that the port of Tyndis was located at the northwestern border of Keprobotos (Chera dynasty). The North Malabar region, which lies north of the port at Tyndis, was ruled by the kingdom of Ezhimala during Sangam period. According to the Periplus of the Erythraean Sea, a region known as Limyrike began at Naura and Tyndis. However, Ptolemy mentions only Tyndis as the Limyrike's starting point. The region probably ended at Kanyakumari; it thus roughly corresponds to the present-day Malabar Coast. The value of Rome's annual trade with the region was estimated at 50,000,000 sesterces. Pliny the Elder mentioned that Limyrike was prone by pirates. The Cosmas Indicopleustes mentioned that the Limyrike was a source of peppers.

According to the Legend of Cheraman Perumals, the first Indian mosque was built in 624 AD at Kodungallur with the mandate of the last the ruler (the Cheraman Perumal) of Chera dynasty, who converted to Islam during the lifetime of Muhammad (c. 570–632). According to Qissat Shakarwati Farmad, the Masjids at Kodungallur, Kollam, Madayi, Barkur, Mangalore, Kasaragod, Kannur, Dharmadam, Panthalayini, and Chaliyam, were built during the era of Malik Dinar, and they are among the oldest Masjids in the Indian subcontinent. It is believed that Malik Dinar died at Thalangara in Kasaragod town.

Chaliyam, on the southern bank of Chaliyar river and the northern bank of Kadalundi River, was a part of the kingdom of Parappanad during the medieval period. The rulers of Parappanad were vassals to the Zamorin of Calicut. The headquarters of the Parappanad royal family was the coastal town of Parappanangadi in the present-day Malappuram district. In the 15th century, Parappanad Swaroopam was divided into two - Northern Parappanad (Beypore Swaroopam) and Southern Parappanad (Parappur Swaroopam). Kadalundi, Vallikkunnu, and Parappanangadi, were included in Southern Parappanad. Beypore, Cheruvannur, and Panniyankara, on northern bank of Chaliyar, became Northern Parappanad.

It is also known that the ruler of the Kingdom of Tanur (Vettathunadu Swaroopam), assisted the Portuguese in building a fort in Southern Parappanad, which was later destroyed during the Siege of Chaliyam in 1571. Feroke became a part of the Kingdom of Mysore in the late 18th century CE. Chaliyam became a part of the Kingdom of Mysore in the late 18th century. Following the Third Anglo-Mysore War and the subsequent Treaty of Seringapatam, Chaliyam became a part of Malabar District under British Raj. Chaliyam was included in Eranad Taluk in the Malappuram Revenue Division of Malabar District with its Taluk headquarters at Manjeri. Following the formation of the state of Kerala in 1956, Chaliyam became a part of Tirurangadi Revenue block of Tirur Taluk. On 16 June 1969, Eranad Taluk, Tirur Taluk, Tirurangadi, and Parappanangadi, were transferred to the newly formed Malappuram district. However, three revenue villages of Tirur Taluk, namely, Feroke, Ramanattukara, and Kadalundi, remained in Kozhikode district, as they were much closer to Kozhikode city centre. However Kadalundi Nagaram beach (where Kadalundi River flows into Arabian Sea, a part of Vallikkunnu Grama Panchayat), Tenhipalam, the centre of University of Calicut, and Karippur, the site of Calicut International Airport, became parts of Malappuram. Feroke, Ramanattukara, and Kadalundi are parts of Kozhikode Taluk and Kozhikode metropolitan area.

== Important landmarks ==
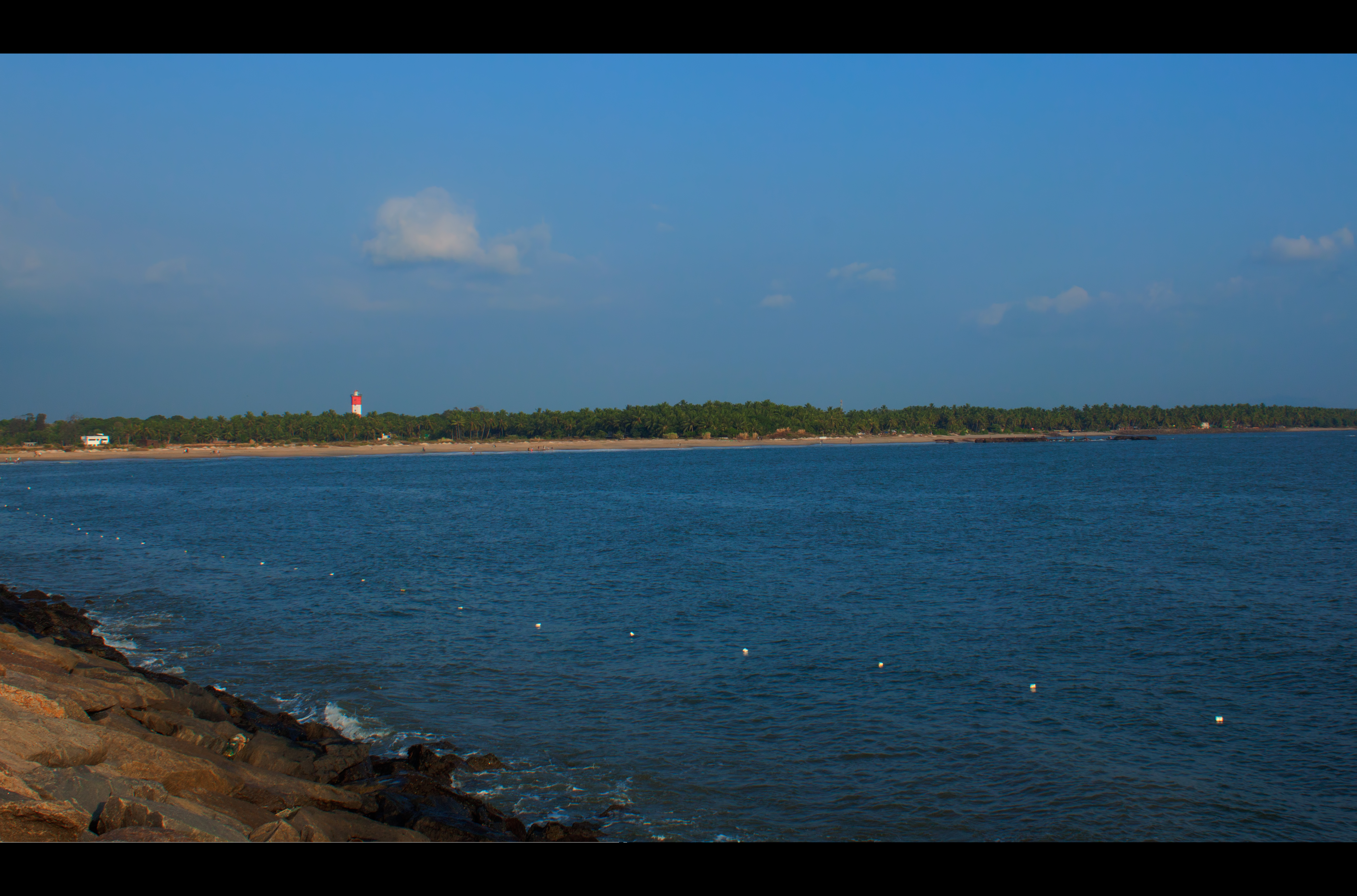
Chaliyam lighthouse

- Lighthouse, Chaliyam
- Umbhichi Hajee Higher Secondary School Chaliyam
- NIRDESH Project
- Itti Achuthan Memorial Hortus Malaricus Plants Museum
- Noorudheen Shaikh Jaram (Darga)
- Seawalk (one km)
- Puzhakkara Srambia with ancient shadow-clock.
- Engattil Mazjid (Old Srambia)
- Vadakkumbad Kamaliyya School (100 yeara old)
- Jankar service across Chaliyar River to Beypore port
- Relics of the old Chaliyam fort
- Chaliyam Coastal Police Station
- Sreekandeswara Temple

== Suburbs and villages ==
- Vallikkunnu, Anangady and Anappady
- Kacherikunnu, Athanikkal and Anayarangadi
- Kottakkadavu, Pediyattukunnu and Edachira
- Kadalundi, Vattaparambu and Pazhanjannor
- Kadukkabazar and Chaliyarkadavu

== See also ==
- Imam Shihabuddeen Ahmed Koya
- Beypore
- Feroke
- Kadalundi
- Kadalundi Bird Sanctuary
- Karuvanthuruthy
- Vallikkunnu
- Chaliyar river
- Siege of Chaliyam

== Image gallery ==
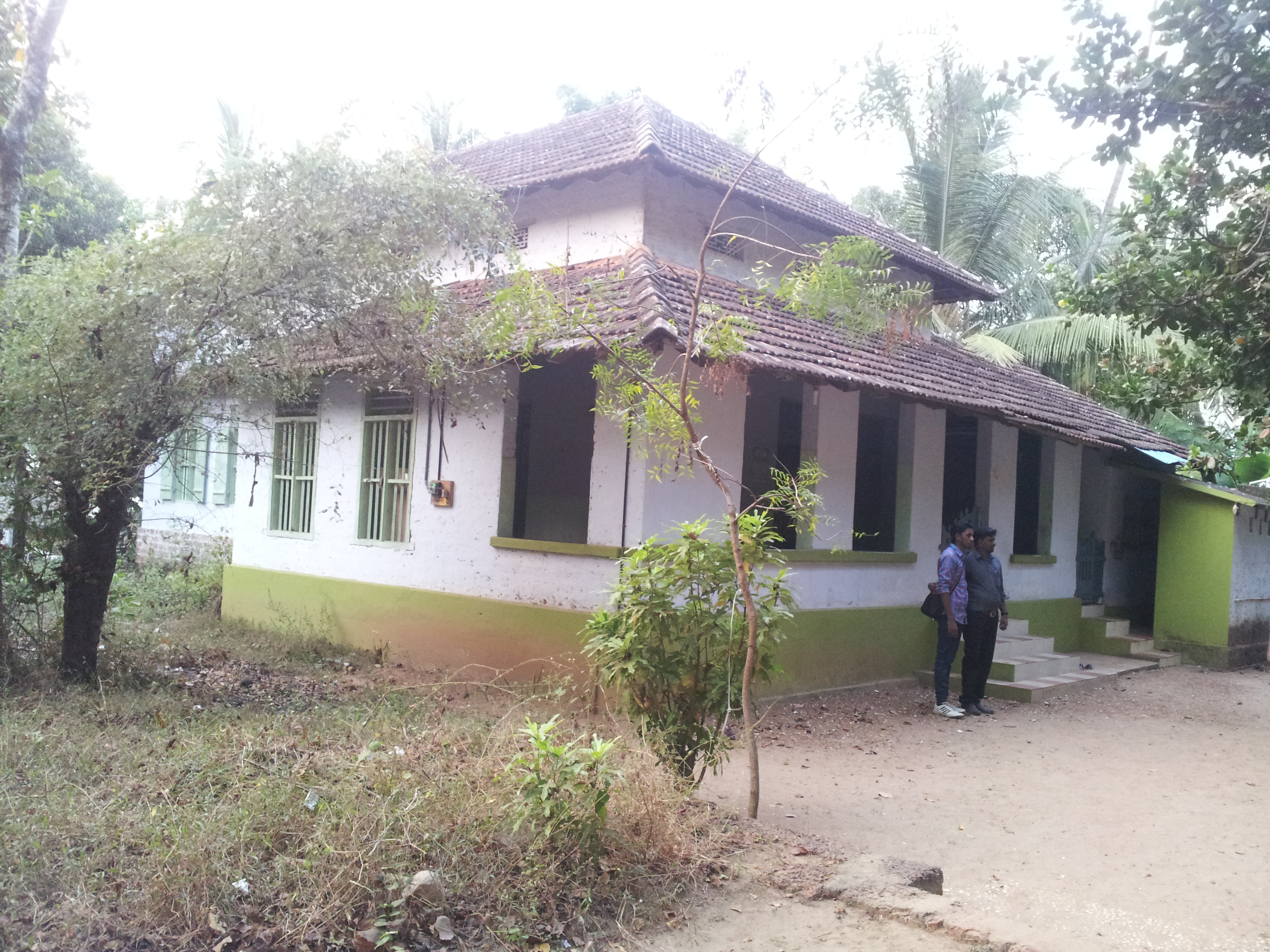
Puzhakkara Srambia, Chaliyam

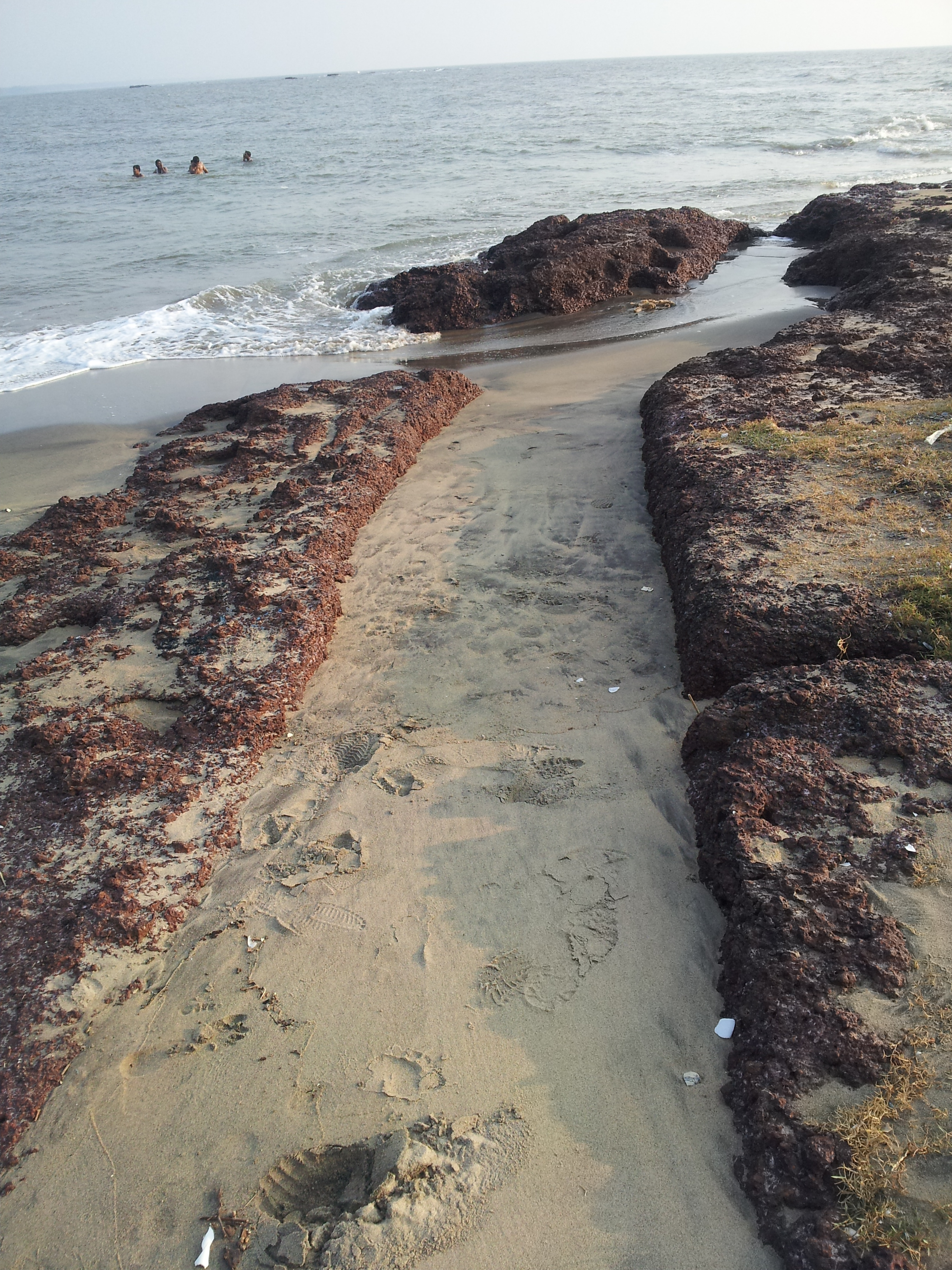
Relics of the old Chaliyam fort

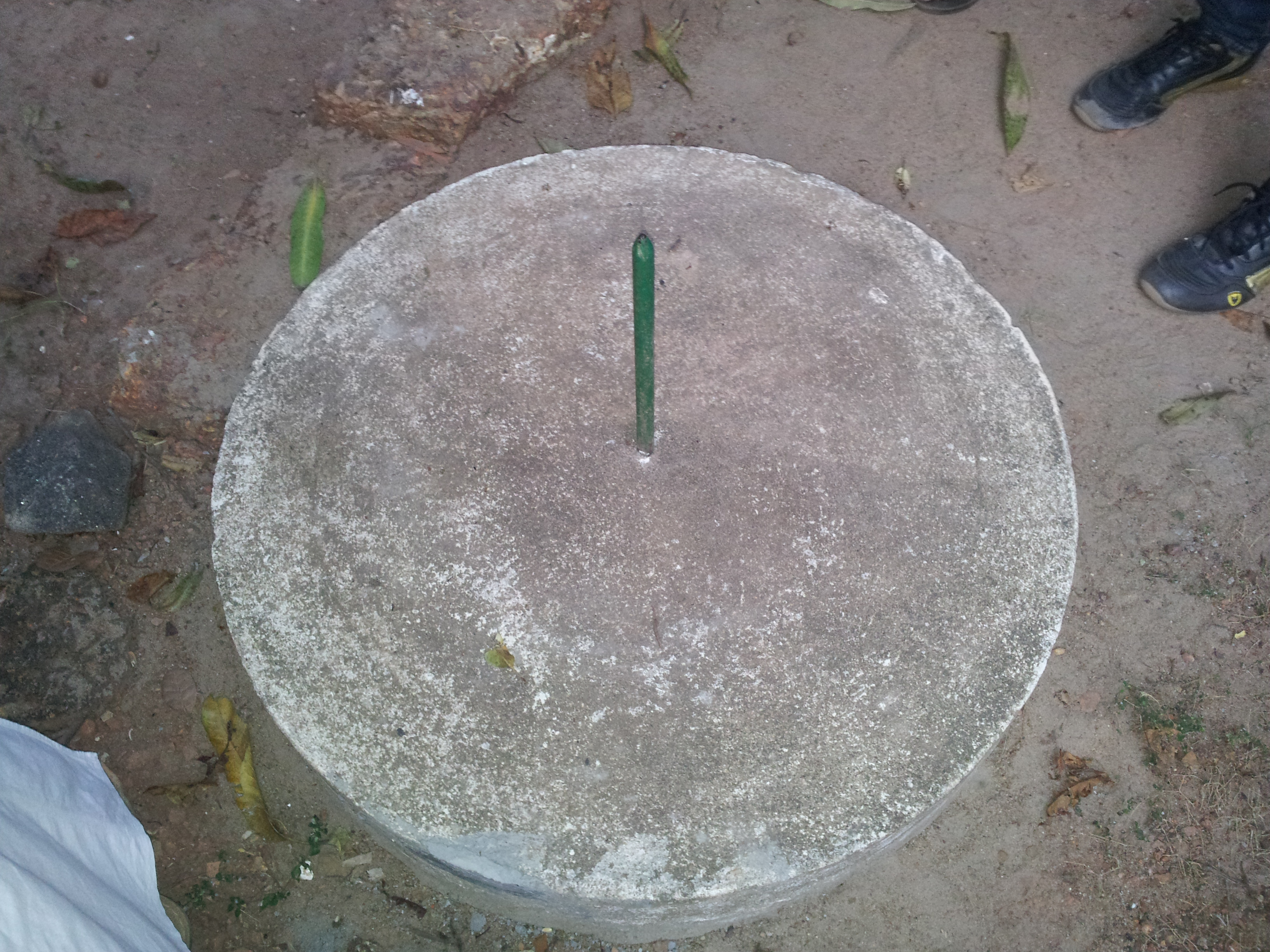
Old Shadow Clock at the Puzhakkara Srambia

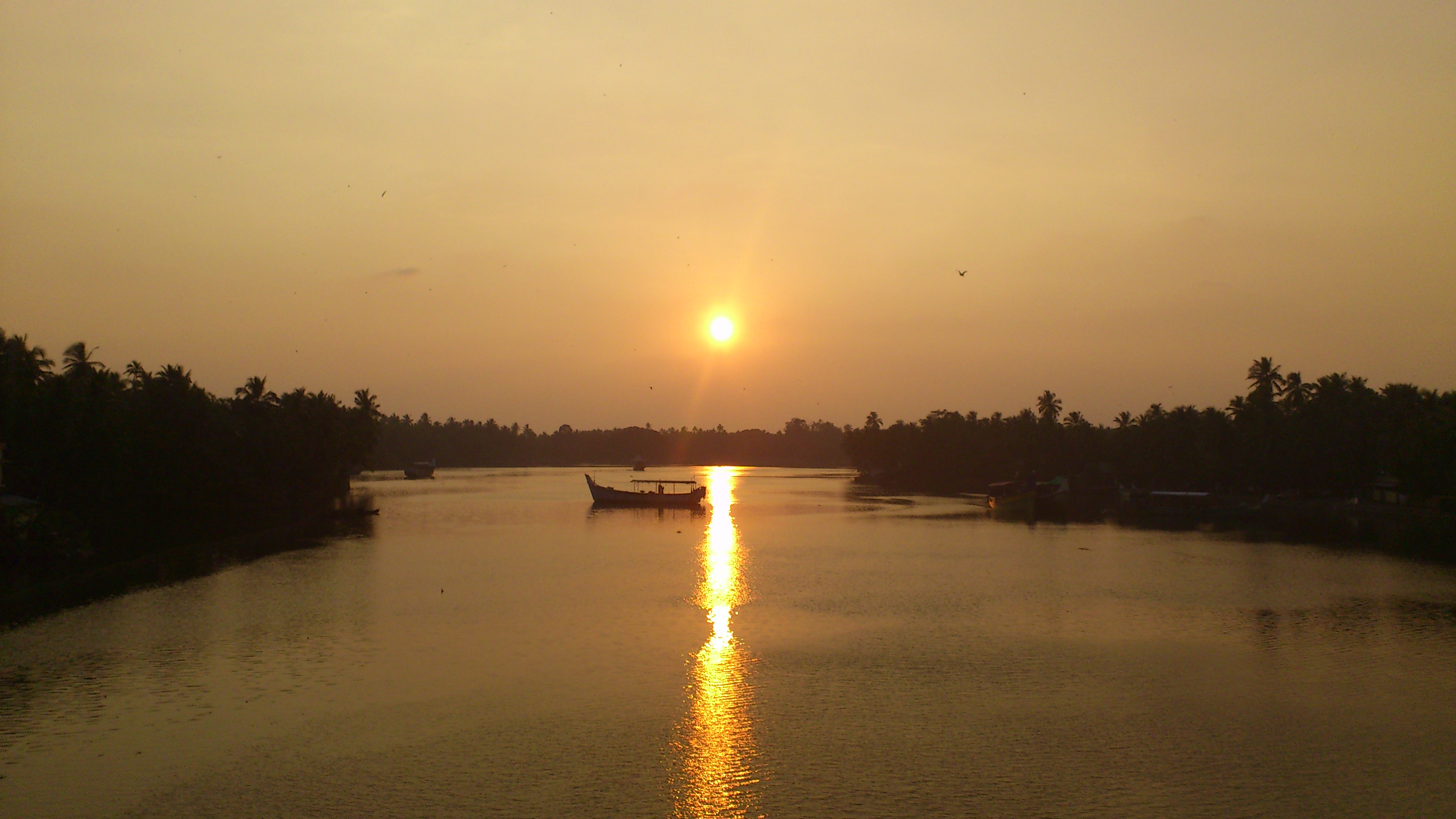
Chaliyam in the evening

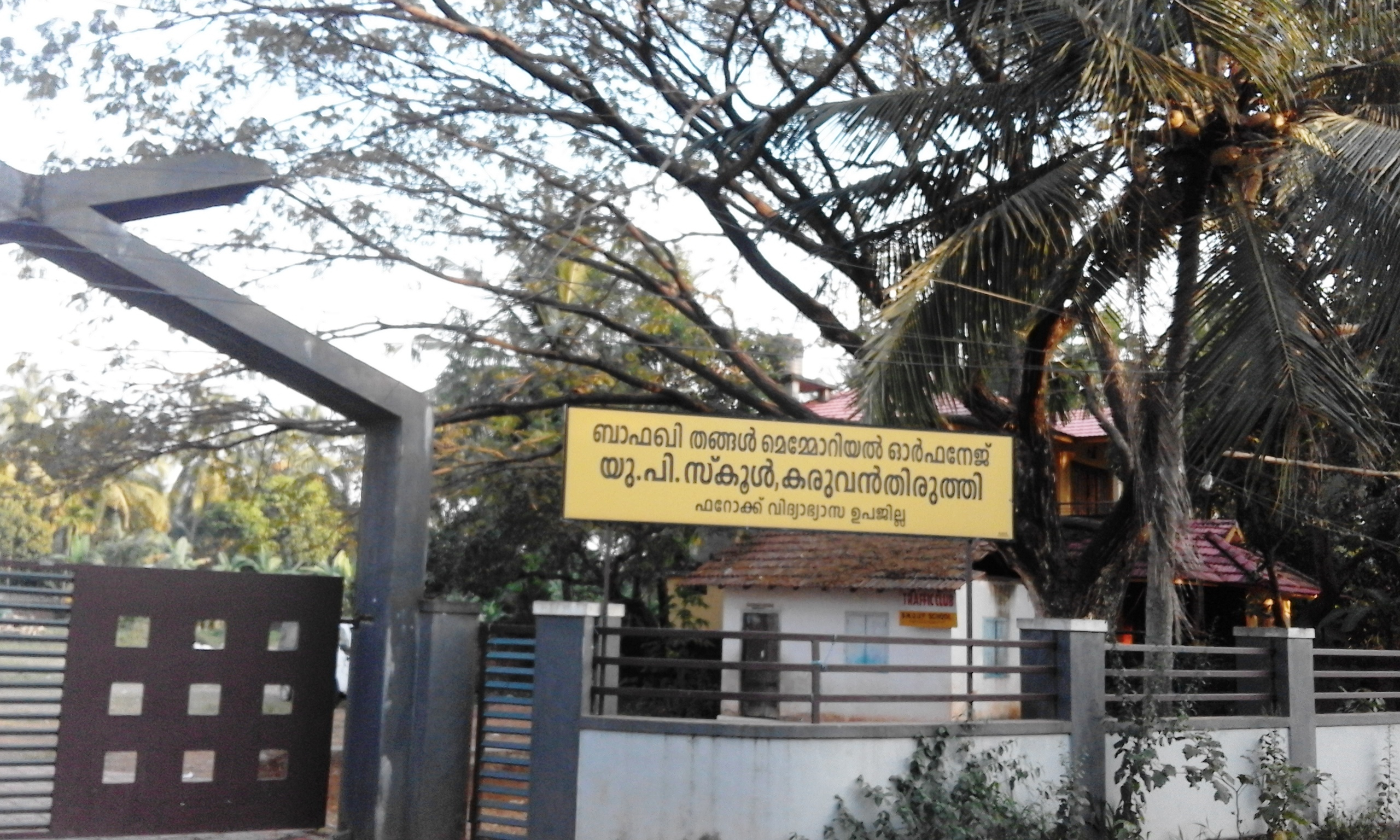
Bafaki Thangal School

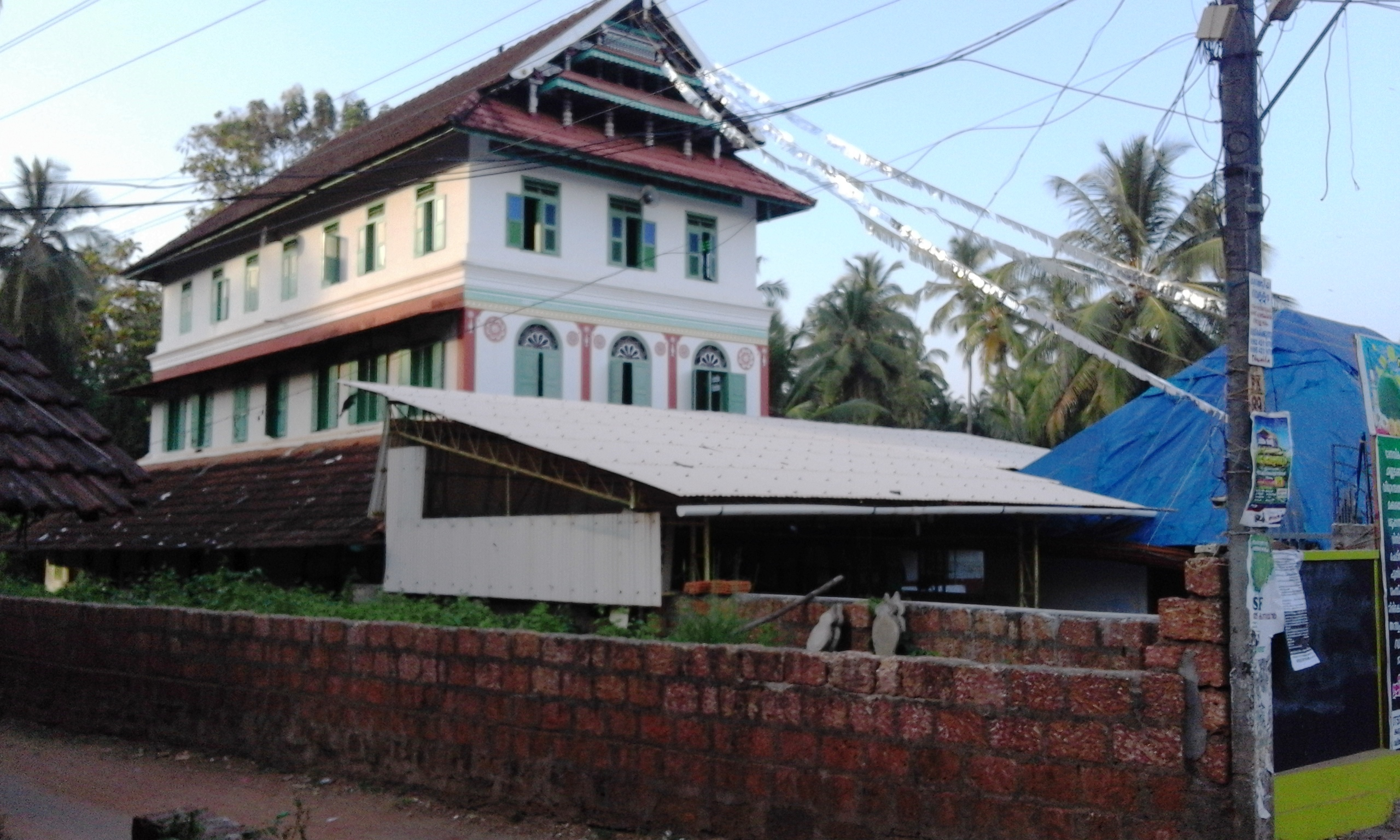
Kadavath Masjidh

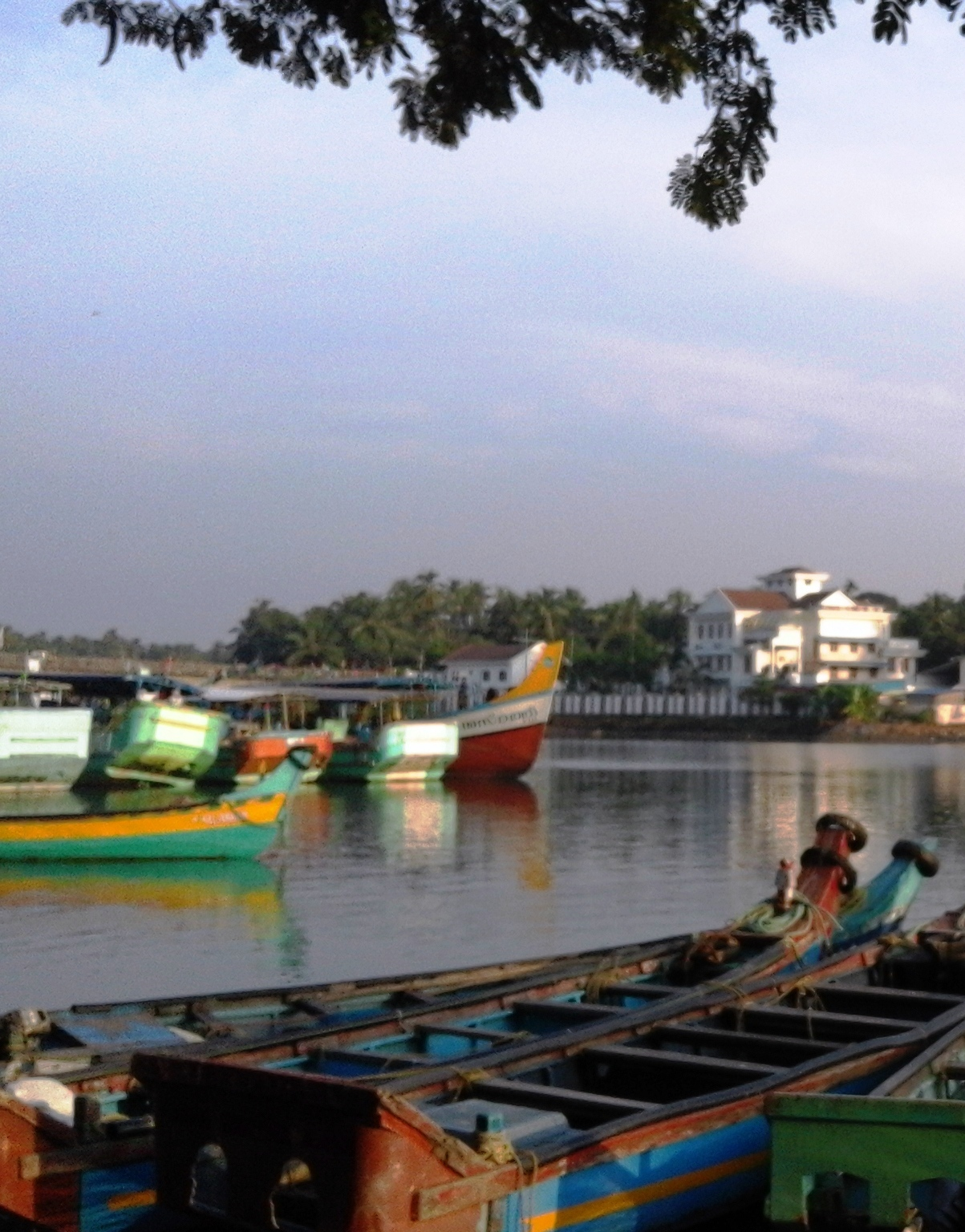
Karuvanthuruthy Kadavu
