= Siege of Chaliyam =

Siege and capture of Chaliyam fort by Zamorin

Siege of Chale
- Part of War of the League of the Indies
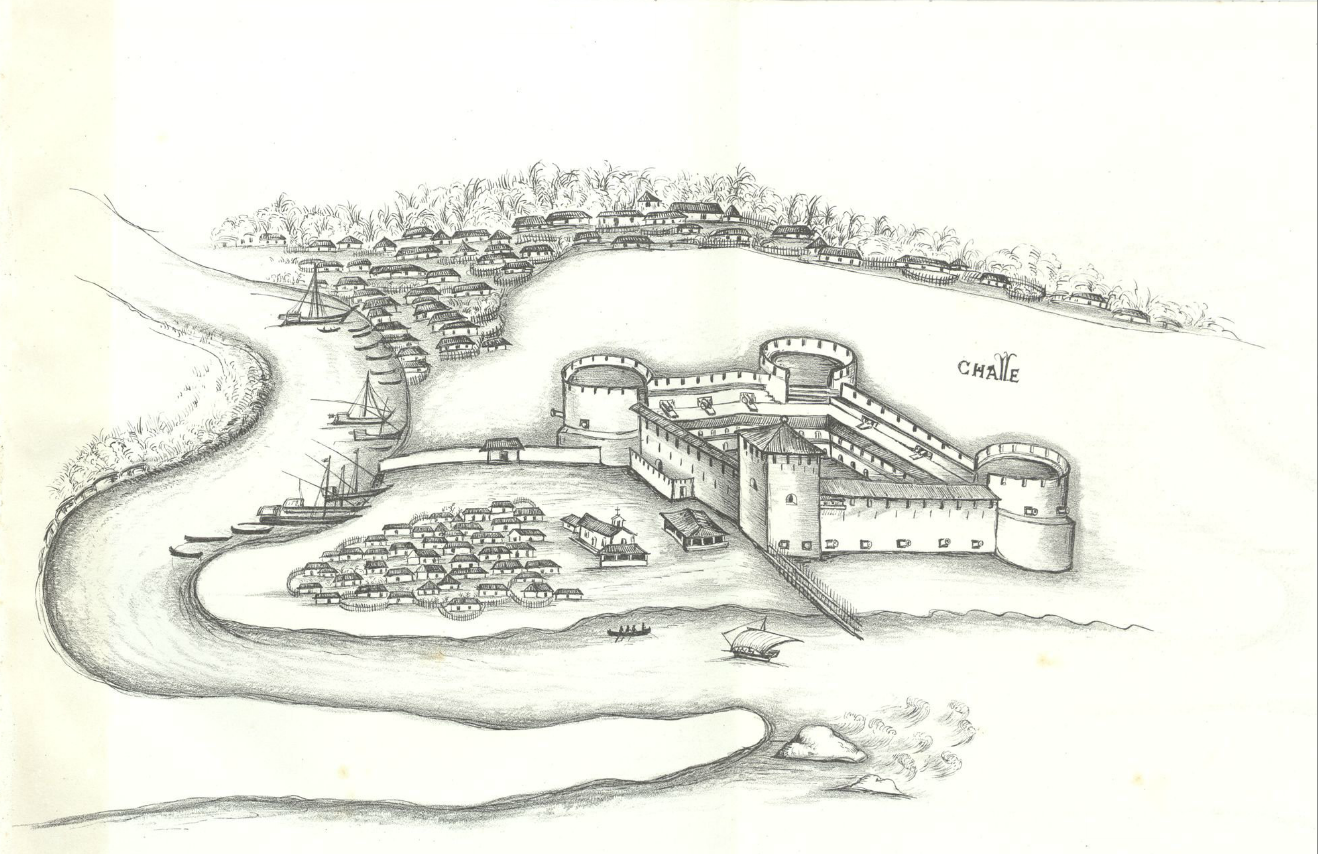
- Chale (Chaliyam) Fortress
Date	July – November 1571
Location	Chaliyam, Kerala, India
Result	Calicut victory

Belligerents
Calicut	Portuguese Empire

Commanders and leaders
Mangattachan	Dom Jorge de Castro (surrendered)

Strength
40 cannons	Unknown

The siege of Chale or siege of Chaliyam took place in 1571 as a part of the war of the league of the Indies between the Zamorin of Calicut and the Portuguese Empire. Zamorin's Calicut army successfully starved out the fortress, compelling the surrender of Portuguese captain Dom Jorge de Castro.

== Background ==
The Zamorin had emerged as a major power in Malabar and the arrival of the Portuguese changed the status quo. Former vassals of the Zamorin joined the Portuguese in an attempt to free themselves from Calicut's suzerainty. The Portuguese had built a fort at Chaliyam from whence they could strike deep into the Zamorin's domains. The fort of Chaliyam was described as "a pistol held against the throat of the Zamorin". In south India, the Portuguese allied with the Vijayanagar empire who were the traditional enemies of the Deccan Sultanates.

== The siege ==
The Zamorin made an alliance with the Deccan Sultanates and tried to arrange a combined attack on the Portuguese. While Ahmednagar and Bijapur sultanates besieged the Portuguese settlements of the north, Zamorin's troops laid siege to the fortress at Chaliyam on 14 July 1571. He bombarded the fortress with 40 cannons. Calicut troops successfully blockaded the Portuguese reinforcement vessels also by placing an artillery battery on the mouth of the river. The supplies sent from Kochi and Kannur for the Portuguese were also intercepted. The provisions ran short and the defenders inside the fort were driven to feed on dogs.

The Portuguese captain Dom Jorge de Castro sent messengers to the Zamorin and sued for peace, offering to surrender cannons kept in their fort, and to indemnify amply for expenses incurred in the war. The Zamorin did not agree to it although his ministers were satisfied with the offer. On November 1571, When the Portuguese were in an extremely dangerous condition for want of food, and did not find any way to conclude peace, they sent messengers offering to surrender the fort and all that it contained, provided that a safe passage was given for them and protection for property in their possession assured, till they reached a place where they could feel safe and secure. The Zamorin agreed to these conditions and permitted the garrison to march out at midnight.

The Zamorin took possession of the cannons and other things found inside and demolished the fortress completely "leaving no stone upon another". Dom Jorge de Castro was later executed in Goa for surrendering the fort.

== Aftermath ==
After the loss of the Chaliyam fortress in 1571, an order came out from Portugal to divide the Portuguese possessions into three portions, designated India, Mwenemutapa, and Malacca. According to William Logan, "The decline of the Portuguese power seems to have dated from the time of this arrangement, for the consequence was a train of perplexities that distracted the Portuguese more than all the previous attacks of their enemies in India". However, according to Saturino Monteiro, the fort of Chaliyam had little strategic interest, and its loss did not represent a serious setback for the Portuguese.

== Bibliography ==
- Saturnino Monteiro (2011), Portuguese Sea Battles, Volume III - From Brazil to Japan, 1539-1579.
- António Pinto Pereira (1617), História da Índia, ao Tempo Que a Governou o Vice-Rei D. Luiz de Ataíde
