= Vadakkuparamba =

Coordinates: 11.0925°N 76.1867°E

- Village
- Interactive map of Vadakkuparamba
- Country: India
- State: Kerala
- District: Malappuram

Languages
  - Official: Malayalam, English
- Time zone: UTC+5:30 (IST)
- PIN: 676521
- Telephone code: 0483
- Vehicle registration: KL-
- Nearest city: Pandikkad
- Lok Sabha constituency: Malappuram

Vadakkuparamba is a small village in Anakkayam panchayat, in the Malappuram District of Kerala, India. Nearby cities are Pandikkad (5 km) and Manjeri (10 km). A meander of the Kadalundi River surrounds the village.

== Culture ==
Vadakkuparamba village is within a predominantly Muslim populated area. Hindus are present in comparatively smaller numbers. So the culture of the locality is based upon Muslim traditions. Duff Muttu, Kolkali and Aravanamuttu are common folk arts of this locality. There are libraries attached to mosques giving a source of Islamic studies. Most of the books are written in Arabi-Malayalam which is a version of the Malayalam language written in Arabic script. The Hindu minority of this area keep their traditions by celebrating various festivals in their temples. Hindu rituals are performed here regularly as in other parts of Kerala.

== Education ==
The village is served by the M.M.L.P. primary school.

== Transportation ==
Vadakkuparamba village connects to other parts of India through Manjeri town. National highway No.66 passes through Parappanangadi and the northern stretch connects to Goa and Mumbai. The southern stretch connects to Cochin and Trivandrum. National Highway No.966 connects to Palakkad and Coimbatore. The nearest airport is at Kozhikode. The nearest major railway station is at Tirur.
