= Vengara, Malappuram district =

Vengara
- Town
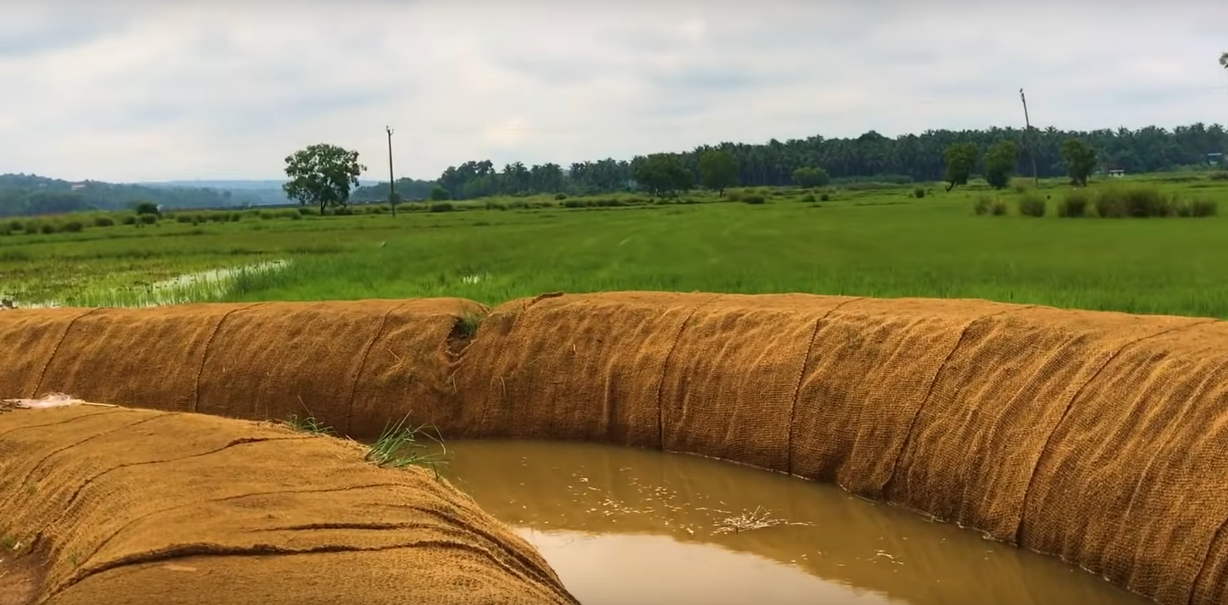
- Kooriyad field

- Location in Kerala, India Vengara (India)
- Coordinates: 11.050807°N 75.977679°E
- Country: India
- State: Kerala
- District: Malappuram

Population
  - Total: 48,600

Languages
  - Official: Malayalam, English
- Time zone: UTC+5:30 (IST)
- PIN: 676 304
- Telephone code: 0494
- ISO 3166 code: IN-KL
- Vehicle registration: KL-65

Vengara is a town in the Malappuram district of Kerala state, India. It falls under the jurisdiction of the Vengara Grama Panchayat and is part of Tirurangadi Taluk.

== Official status ==
Vengara is a "special grade" panchayath in Malappuram district and is situated in Tirurangadi Taluk. It was famous for its spice trading. The discovery of oil in the Gulf countries led to large scale migration of people to work in semi-skilled jobs. It has significant role in improving quality of life and bringing prosperity to this part of Kerala.

The town is a connecting point between kondotty-kottakal road and parappanangadi-malappuram road.

In the recent delimitation of constituencies Vengara Assembly constituency was formed. Vengara is included in the Malappuram Loksabha constituency. Vengara is the headquarters of Vengara Block Panchayath. There is a sub-district with Vengara as headquarters in Malappuram educational district. Vengara is also home to a police station and a BSNL telephone exchange.

=== Tourist destinations ===
- Mini Ooty
- Cheruppadimala
- Chittadi Kulam
- Ekar Kulam

== Education ==
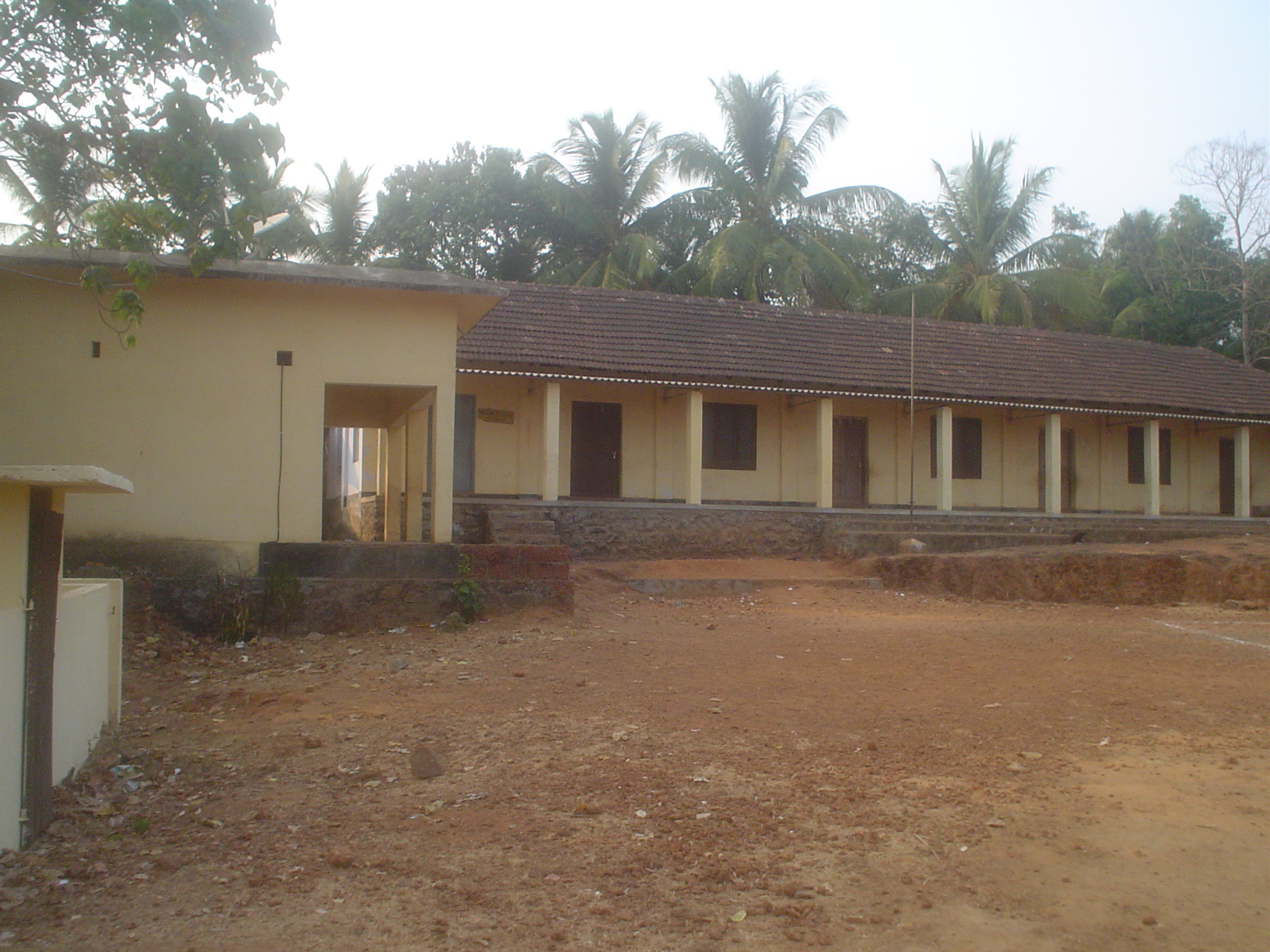
Nottappuram School

Malabar College of Advanced Studies is a resourceful destination for higher studies in Vengara. Higher Secondary Schools Govt Girls VHSS Vengara and KMHSS Kuttoor North are within the boundary of Vengara Panchayath.Govt.Boys VHSS Vengra situated in town. Tirurangadi PSMO College, Chemmad Darul Huda university, IUHSS Parappur etc. are within 7 km from Vengara.

== Politics ==
Vengara Panchayath is ruled by the alliance of Indian Union Muslim League and Indian National Congress parties. Chakkeeri Ahemed Kutty(late) was from Vengara.

Vengara Panchayath includes 24 wards. Panchayath ruling council is presided by NT Abdul Nazar(Muslim League).

== Geography ==
Vengara is spread on the banks of Kadalundi River, the third-longest river in Malabar after Bharathappuzha and Chaliyar. Oorakam Mala is the highest nearby hill. Vengara is 5 km from Tirurangadi, 6 km from Chemmad a major town in the district and 15 km from Malappuram and Parappanangadi. Kottakkal is 8 km from Vengara. Other nearby towns are Manjeri (27 km) and Tirur (23 km).

== People ==
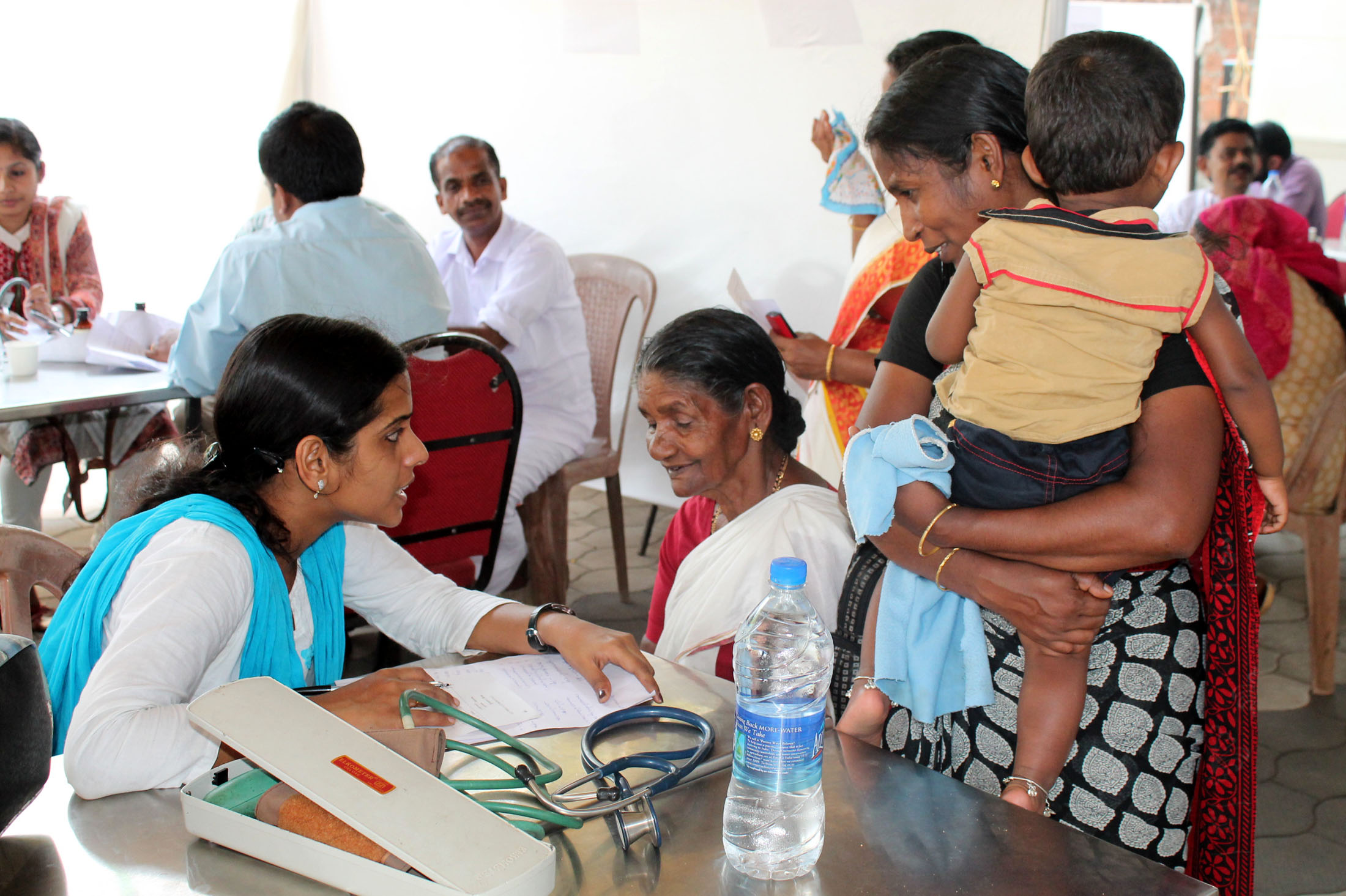
A medical camp at Vengara, 2016

The population is predominantly Muslims followed by Hindus, with few Christians. The major source of income is remittances from family members employed in Gulf countries. Other occupations include retail and agriculture.

== Culture ==
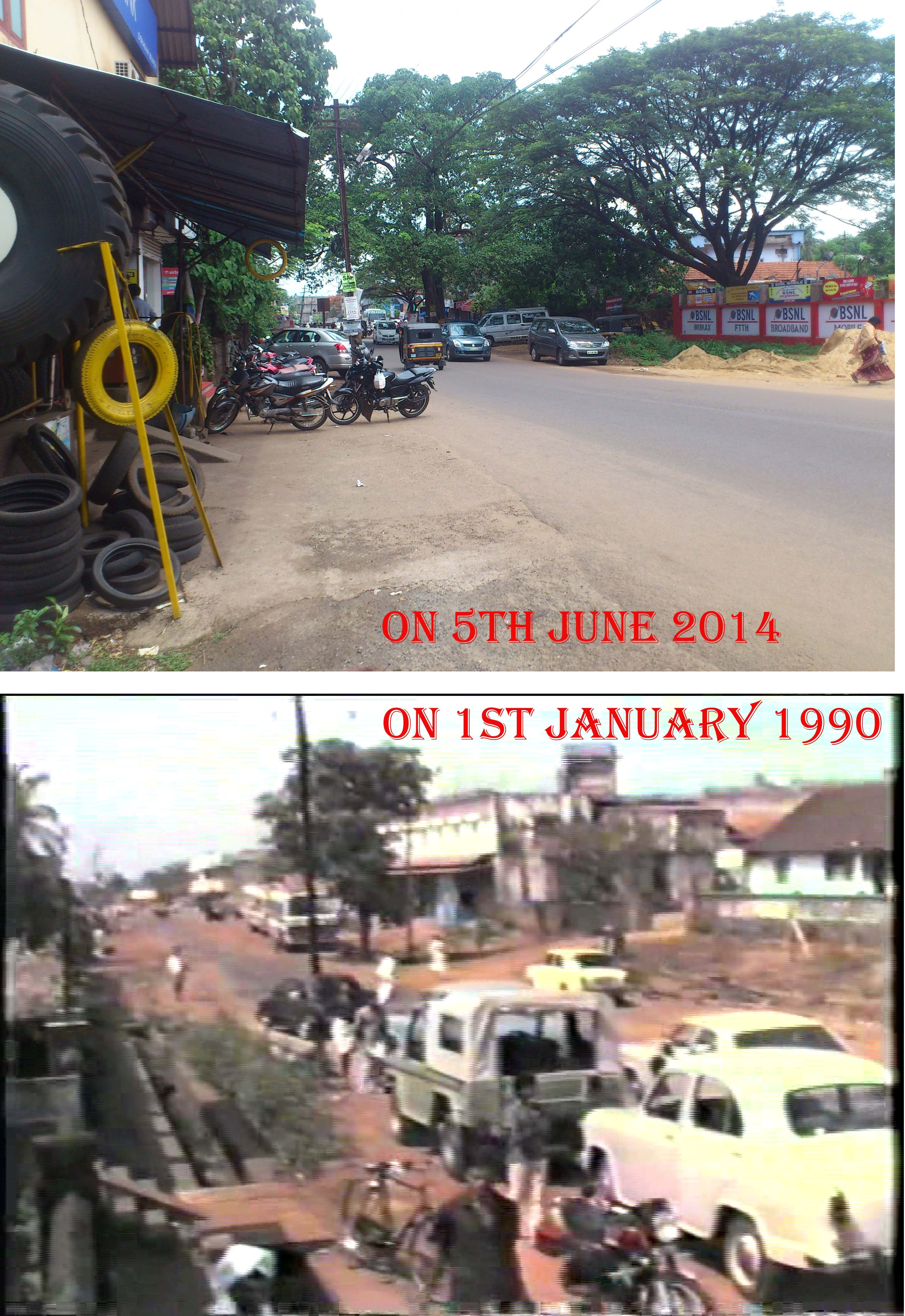
Vengara Now and Then

Onam: This is the most important and widely celebrated festival in Kerala, including Vengara. Onam is marked by grand feasts, traditional dances like Pulikali, and the famous floral carpet (Pookalam) competition. It celebrates the annual visit of King Mahabali. Vishu: Another significant festival in Vengara, Vishu marks the Malayalam New Year. It is celebrated with rituals like the Vishu Kani (the first thing viewed on the day of Vishu), fireworks, and special meals. Eid and Christmas: Vengara is home to a diverse community, so Eid and Christmas are also celebrated with enthusiasm. Special prayers, feasts, and community gatherings mark these occasions.

== Transportation ==
The nearest airport is at Kozhikode. The nearest major railway station is at Parappanangadi, Tanur.
