= Madayi =

- Census Town
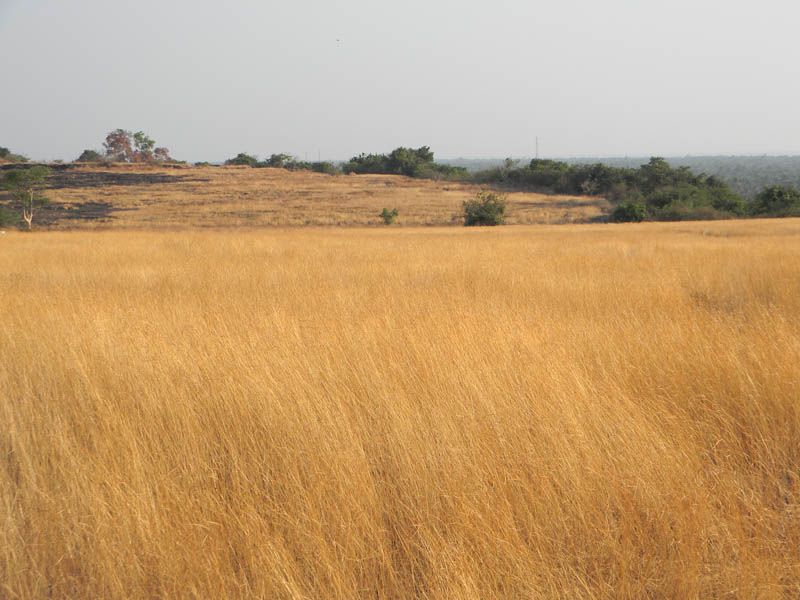
- Madayippara

- Location in Kerala, India Madayi (India)
- Coordinates: 11°58′0″N 75°18′0″E
- Country: India
- State: Kerala
- District: Kannur

Government
  - Type: Panchayati raj (India)
  - Body: Madayi Grama panchayat

Area
  - Total: 16.17 km^{2} (6.24 sq mi)

Population
  - Total: 35,888
  - Density: 2,219/km^{2} (5,748/sq mi)

Languages
  - Official: Malayalam, English
- Time zone: UTC+5:30 (IST)
- PIN: 670304
- Vehicle registration: KL-86

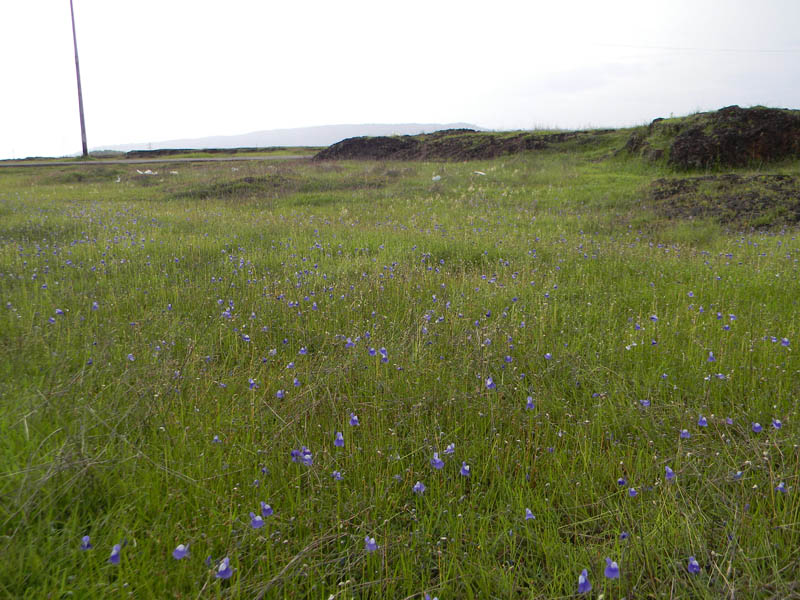
Madayippara in September

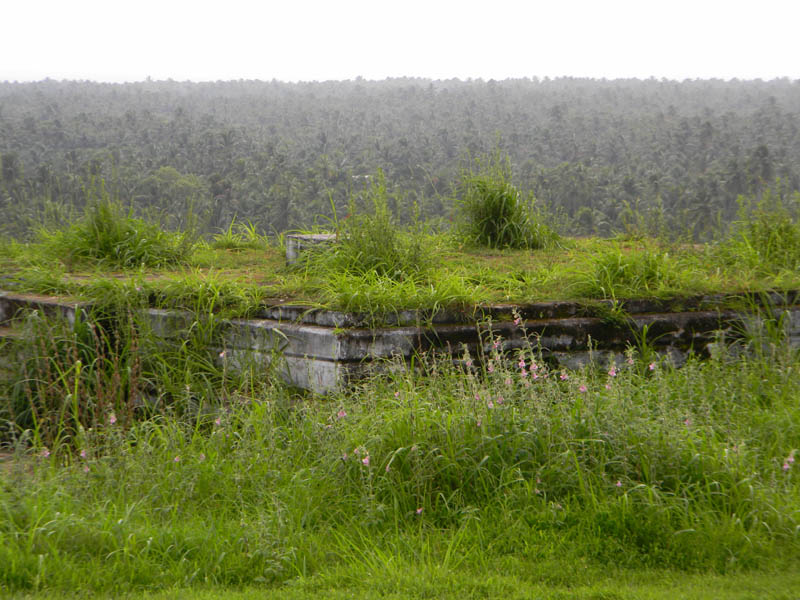
Madayi Fort

Madayi (a.k.a. Madai). is a Census Town and Grama panchayat in Kannur district of Kerala state, India.

== Demographics ==
As of 2011 Census, Madayi had a population of 35,888 which constitutes 16,168 (45.1%) males and 19,720 (54.9%) females. Madayi census town spreads over an area of 17.08 km^{2} (6.59 sq mi) with 6,687 families residing in it. The male female sex ratio was 1,220 higher than state average of 1,084. 13.6% of total population were children under 6 years. Madayi had overall literacy of 94.1% higher than state average of 94%. The male literacy stands at 96.6% and female literacy was 92.1%.

== Religion ==
As of 2011 Indian census, Madayi census town had population of 35,888, of which 22,585 (62.9%) are Muslims, 11,552 (32.2%) are Hindus, 1,657 (4.6%) are Christians and 0.3% others.

== History ==
This place was under the rule of Chirakkal Rajas during late medieval period.

== Plants ==
An account on the flora of Madayipara is given here to provide a picture of the kind of vegetation found on the laterite hill system with which the fauna frequenting the area are associated with, and also to stress upon the importance of the uniqueness of the flora supported by such laterite hill systems, often ignored by many. The midland hillocks of northern Kerala have its own characteristic floral composition supporting scrub jungles and cashew plantations on the hill slopes and grasslands and associated aquatic and semi-aquatic plants on the hilltops. Even though these hills are exposed directly to the sunlight and wind, they harbour rich species diversity. Recent plant explorations revealed more additions to the known plant species of the area some of which turned out to be new to science, and endemic to the locality. The vegetation of the hillocks may be classified mainly into grasslands and scrub jungles. The grasslands can again be categorised into wet phase and dry phase grasslands based on the seasons. Altogether 512 plant species have been recorded from Madayipara. The midland hillocks of northern Kerala have its own characteristic floral composition supporting scrub jungles and cashew plantations on the hill slopes and grasslands and associated aquatic and semi-aquatic plants on the hilltops. Even though these hills are exposed directly to the sunlight and wind, they harbour rich species diversity. Recent plant explorations revealed more additions to the known plant species of the area some of which turned out to be new to science, and endemic to the locality. The vegetation of the hillocks may be classified mainly into grasslands and scrub jungles. The grasslands can again be categorised into wet phase and dry phase grasslands based on the seasons. Altogether 512 plant species have been recorded from Madayipara.

== Grasslands ==
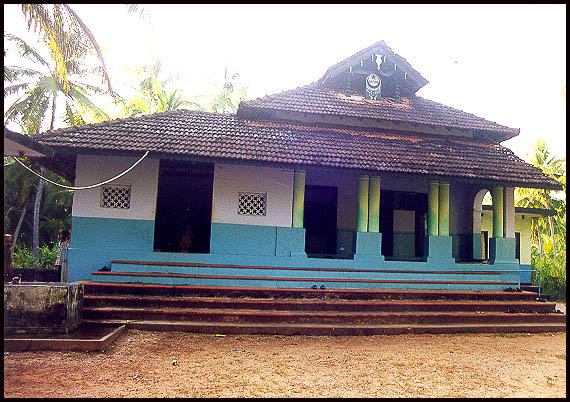
Utharam Srambia, Madayi

Grasslands of Kerala have been classified into two types i.e., Low elevation grasslands and high elevation grasslands. The grasslands on the laterite hills of north Malabar are classified under low elevation dry grasslands, characterised by remarkable diversity. This type of natural grassland is the characteristic feature of the laterite hills of Kozhikode, Kannur, Kasaragod districts and the lower parts of Wayanad district. These grasslands are highly seasonal and interspersed with other herbaceous plants and scrub jungles. A total 55 species of grasses are recorded from Madayipara hills, many more remaining to be fully identified. The common grass species are the Eragrostis uniloides, Ischaemum indicum, Heteropogon contortus, Pennisetum polystachyon, Cynodon dactylon and species belonging to the genera Arundinella, Dimeria, Panicum, Themeda, etc. Species of Arundinella form the commonest grasses during the months of October and November. The pinkish inflorescence of these grasses makes the area appear as if burnt mixed here and there with green shades. According to Agarwal (1961), Arundinella form a higher stage in the succession. So it can be safely stated that Arundinella grasses represent a higher stage in grassland development in the areas where they occur. Recent plant explorations revealed some more new species of grasses from the laterite hills of north Malabar (Sreekumar and Nair, 1991), 11 out of 37 endemic grasses of Kerala are reported from this kind of locality. Thus, these hillocks are isolated ecological niches of conservation importance. However, a detailed account of the species association is lacking. Grasses control erosion, and several species are well known for their rich fodder value. When the monsoon recedes, the local people start cutting grasses for use as fodder for their cattle. A small plot, containing a thick growth of Themeda and other species of grasses fetches about rupees three thousand per season for a landowner.

== Climate ==
=== Wet phase ===
The first fall of southwest monsoon during late May or early June stimulates the germination of seeds and the growth of annual plants. The first groups of plants seen are Neanotis spp., Eriocaulon spp. and grasses, followed by insectivorous plants such as Utricularia spp. and Drosera indica that dominate the land. The deep blue flowers of Utricularia and white flower heads of Eriocaulon and Rhamphicarpa literally paint the whole plateau in shades of blue, violet and white, amidst herbaceous plants such as Sopubia trifida, Lindernia, Polygala elongata, Justicia japonica, Leucas sp. and several others. The shallow depressions filled with water accommodate plants such as Blyxa, Nymphoides krishnakesara, Marsilea minuta, Cryptocoryne spiralis, Rotala malampuzhensis, Rotala malabarica and lsoetes coromandelina. The sparsely distributed south Indian endemic Chamaesyce katrajensis (syn. Euphorbia katrajensis) can also be observed during this phase on the laterite rocks. Following the retreat of south west monsoon, during September, most of the early appearing plants give way to others such as Celosia argentea, Sesamum orientale and grasses such as Arundinella spp., Dimeria spp., Ischaemum indicum, Panicum spp., etc. which dominate subsequently. The abundance of grasses can be noticed during this period. The wet phase lasts up to the end of November.

=== Dry phase ===
Stronger winds during the month of January and the direct incidence of sunlight enhance the drying up process of the flora of Madayipara. The majority of the herbaceous plants dry up except for some grass species and the thorny Lepidagathis keralaensis, which may remain spread all over the rocky regions of the hill. The silver coloured, Polycarpaea corymbosa can also be seen against the black surfaces of the rocks.

== Scrub jungles ==
The scrub jungles form the protective cover of the slopes of the hills. The thick grove adjacent to the clay mining site is one of the major vegetation patches of this hillock. The evergreen forest species such as Hydnocarpus pentandra, Holigrna arnottiana, Cinnamomum sp. are seen in this area. Ficus arnottiana one of the characteristic fig tree of this kind of ecosystem is seen in the southwestern part of the Plateau. The tree is locally called Kallarayal (Malayalam meaning - Peepal Tree of rocks). Other fig species such as Ficus benghalensis, Ficus religiosa, Ficus racemosa, Ficus tinctoria, Ficus exasperata and Ficus hispida also support large number of frugivorous birds and bats during their fruiting season. The small groves of Ixora coccinea, Ziziphus oenoplia, Ziziphus rugosa and thick clumps of Calycopteris flouribunda give refuge to a large number of small animals and birds in addition to providing nectar to butterflies and other insects during their flowering season. The forest dwelling species of Stereospermum colais is one of the major wonders of this woody area, with its large white flowers blooming during November and December. A large tree of Careya arborea situated in the compound of the tourist bungalow also support a large number of animals such as bats, birds, butterflies, etc.

== Rare and endangered plants ==
The geographical and climatical features made Madayipara and the adjacent laterite hillock system in supporting a unique assemblage of species. It is the home of some unique and sparsely distributed endemic plants such as Nymphoides krishnakesara (Joseph and Sivarajan, 1990), Rotala malabarica (Pradeep et al., 1990), Justicia ekakusuma (Pradeep et al., 1991), Lepidagathis keralensis (Madhusoodanan and Singh, 1992) and Eriocaulon madayiparense, (Swapna et al., 2012).

Nymphoides krishnakesara is a small water lily appear during the wet phase in the small pools and ponds on the plateau. Rotala malabarica is a semi-aquatic plant seen largely in the temporary pools. Justicia ekakusuma (Pradeep et al., 1991), aptly named because of its nature of flower, is rare and seen in the rocky edges of the plateau. Lepidagathis keralensis (Madhusoodanan and Singh, 1992) described for the first time from this locality and flowers during the dry phase. It is observed that the number of Justicia ekakusuma has been declining drastically over the years, while other newly described species remain uniformly distributed. Eriocaulon madayiparense grows in temporary pools or wet areas during the wet phase.

Chamaesyce katrajensis (which now includes Euphorbia katrajensis var. kasaragodensis), is an endemic species originally described from the similar habitats of Katraja hills of Maharashtra. The small yellowish to pinkish flowers of this species is seen during the wet phase. This plant is poorly distributed and individuals of the species can be seen on the elevated portions of rocks. Only very few individuals of this species are found in Madayipara. Curuma oligantha is another characteristic plant seen in the laterite habitats during the wet phase. It now includes plants described by Ansari et al. (1982) as Curcuma cannanorensis var. cannanorensis and var. lutea. It is also known from parts of Southern India, Sri Lanka and Myanmar. It also appears immediately after the first shower of the monsoon. Besides, the abundance of insectivorous plants such as Drosera indica and Utricularia spp. are worth mentioning.

Out of 513 species known from the Madayippara, 60 are Peninsular Indian endemics; of which 15 are narrow endemics of Kerala, confined to the laterite hillocks. Sevan species are Indian endemics and 28 species are known from confined to Peninsular Indian and Sri Lanka and 13 species to Indian region and Sri Lanka. The presence of endemic species belonging to various threat categories such as Hopea ponga, Capparis rheedei, Eriocaulon cuspidatum and Neanotis rheedei are also indicate the conservation significance of the area. Another interesting plant of this locality is the rare lycophyte, Isoetes coromandelina found near the temporary pools of Madayipara during the wet phase. It was once widely distributed in the wetlands and paddy fields of Kerala, but becoming rare due to changes in the habitats. Ophioglossum species such as O. costatum, O. nudicale and O. gramineum are also distributed sparsely and make their appearance during the wet phase.

The wet phase of the Laterite hillocks is the more active in terms of the appearance of plant and animals (Jafer Palot and Radhakrishnan, 2005). An analysis of the biological spectrum revels the fact that, majority of the herbaceous members appears along with the first showers, flourish during the monsoon season, complete their life cycle towards the end of the rainy season and enter into the dormant phase by shedding their fruits/seeds or in the form of rhizomes. The dry phase is characterized by the presence of highly adapted, xerophytic plants such as Lepidagathis, Chamaesyce, etc. They may remain fresh to some extent of the summer season, and may dry up leaving the perennial rootstock.

== Conservation ==
The laterite hillock system has been facing serious danger of degradation over the years. Most part of the midland hillocks had been converted to plantations, building sites, minimizing sites, etc. The indiscriminate mining for laterite and soil demolishing the hillocks had been severely threatened the very existence of the biota, culture and also the water availability in most of the areas. The Madayippara and its adjacent hillocks are also not an exception. The mining for the ‘china clay’ has been causing severe damage to the system. It was strongly limited due to the positive intervention by the general public to some extent. However, such operations are going on in other areas. There was a proposal to mine the entire hillock of Madayippara for the lignite deposits. However, it was not yet executed due to the heavy protest from the general public. The ecological and cultural values of the laterite hillocks of the northern Kerala have not been got the due weightage it deserves. Majority of the general public is least bothered about its unique and rich biodiversity. The Madayippara and its environs survived over these years, by supporting its rich cultural and ecological features. However, it is a matter of great concerns that, whether it could continue in preserving its feature, without getting urgent conservation measures. The rate of pollution is very high over these years. It includes wastes such as from the vehicles, dumping of all sorts of wastes from house hold garbage to plastic and industrial debris, etc. The visitors also contribute their share by dumping plastic, cans of drinks, bottles, etc. The lack of awareness is the major reason for the pathetic condition of this type of unique ecosystem, which supports many endemic species. The local administrative bodies could do a lot in conserving this system. Adopting conservation practices such as bringing it under the protection of a community reserve only could save the Madayippara and its environs from degradation.

== Transportation ==
The national highway passes through Taliparamba town. Goa and Mumbai can be accessed on the northern side and Cochin and Thiruvananthapuram can be accessed on the southern side. The road to the east of Iritty connects to Mysore and Bangalore. The nearest railway station is Pazhayangadi on Mangalore-Palakkad line. Trains are available to almost all parts of India subject to advance booking over the internet. There are airports at Kannur, Mangalore and Calicut. All of them are international airports but direct flights are available only to Middle Eastern countries.

== See also ==
- Kannur
- Kozhibazar
- Madayi Kavu
- Madayi Palli
- Malik Deenar
- Pazhayangadi
- Tipu Sultan
