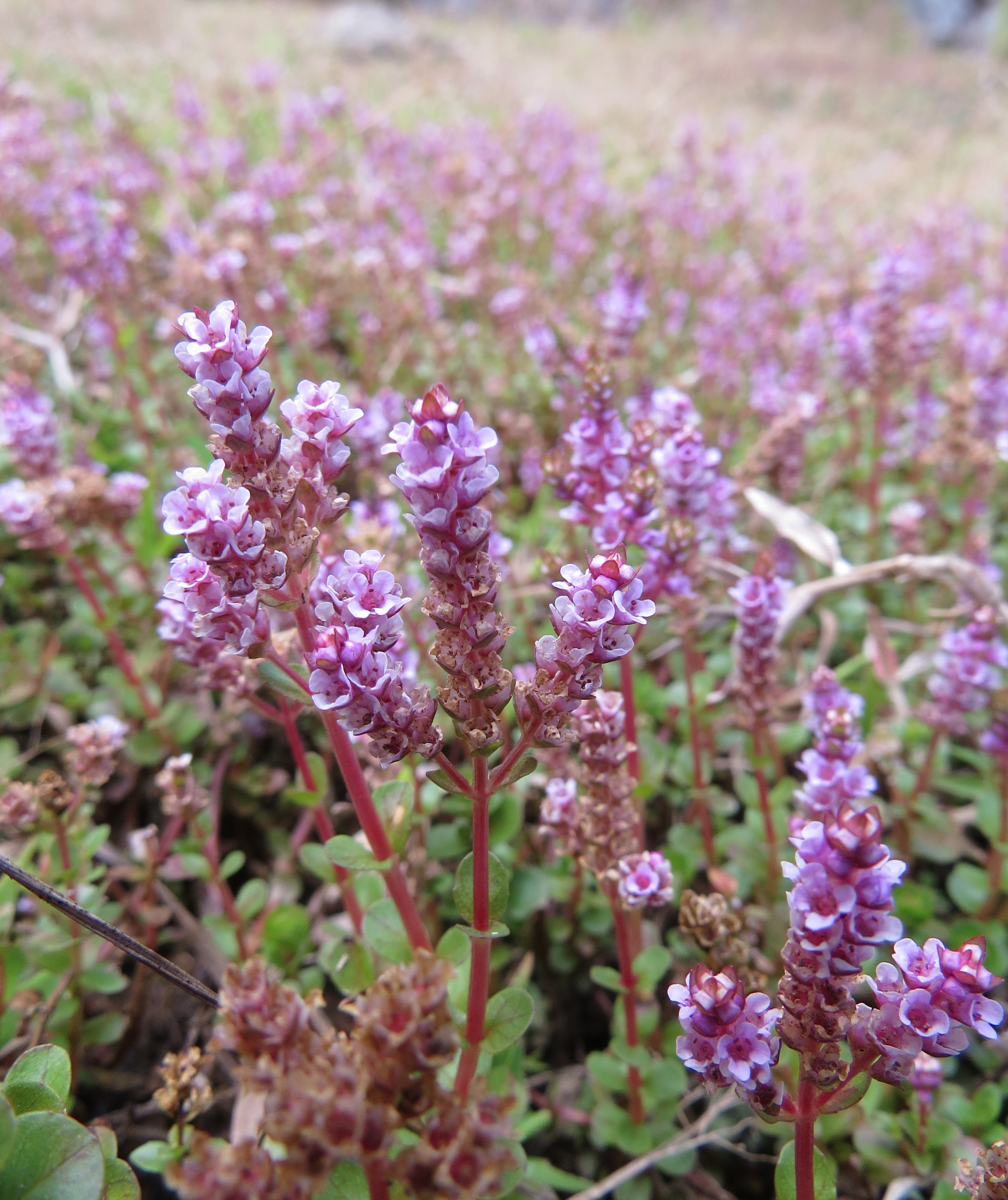
- Flowers

Scientific classification
- Kingdom: Plantae
- Clade: Tracheophytes
- Clade: Angiosperms
- Clade: Eudicots
- Clade: Rosids
- Order: Myrtales
- Family: Lythraceae
- Genus: Rotala
- Species: R. rotundifolia

Binomial name
- Rotala rotundifolia (Buch.-Ham. ex Roxb.) Koehne

Synonyms
- Ammania rotundifolia Hamilton; Ammania latifolia Wallich pro parte Ammania subspicata Bentham; Ameletia rotundifolias Dalzell ex Gibson; Ameletias subspicata Bentham

= Rotala rotundifolia =

Species of aquatic plant

Rotala rotundifolia, the dwarf rotala, is a plant species often confused with Rotala indica. It is sold in the aquarium trade, but is of uncertain status.

It is a common weed in rice paddies and wet places in India, China, Taiwan, Thailand, Laos, and Vietnam, and has been introduced to the United States.

== Description ==
The emersed form has rounded leaves, while submerged leaves are narrow and lanceolate. Form and color may vary with light and environmental conditions. Under strong light, the leaves can become almost wine red. It has pale pink flowers. This plant can be differentiated from the closely related R. indica by the differences in the two species' inflorescences. R. rotundifolia bears groups of terminal inflorescence, while R. indica has solitary flowers on the axis of the leaves.

== Cultivation ==
A common aquarium plant, it is undemanding, but requires light to thrive. R. rotundifolia can withstand relatively cool temperatures. Losing its lower leaves usually means it is not receiving enough light. It can be grown emersed in shallow water, where it will flower. It is propagated by cuttings.
