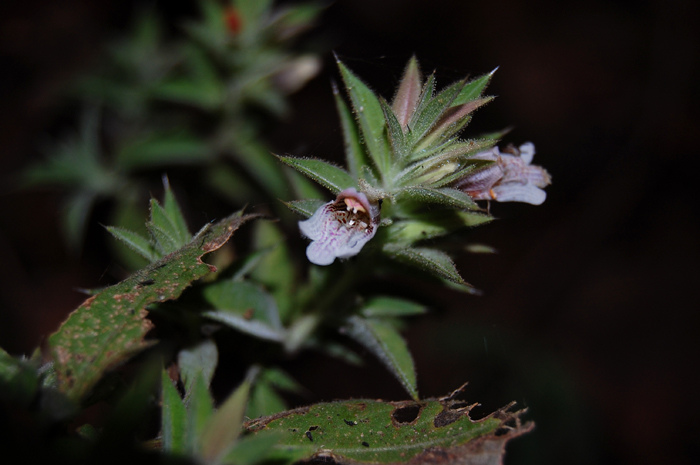

Scientific classification
- Kingdom: Plantae
- Clade: Tracheophytes
- Clade: Angiosperms
- Clade: Eudicots
- Clade: Asterids
- Order: Lamiales
- Family: Acanthaceae
- Genus: Lepidagathis
- Species: L. cuspidata

Binomial name
- Lepidagathis cuspidata Nees

= Lepidagathis cuspidata =

Species of shrub

Lepidagathis cuspidata (also known as Kodajathripaccha, Kodassathripaccha and Spiny Lepidagathis) is a species of plant in the family Acanthaceae. It is native to India and is a prickly subshrub growing profusely on hilly terrain in the Western Ghats, in evergreen forests and in wet places. It has been recorded in the Indian states of Assam, Gujarat, Maharashtra, Karnataka, Kerala and Tamil Nadu, as well as in Nepal and Pakistan.
