= Rotala andamanensis =

Scientific classification
- Kingdom: Plantae
- Clade: Tracheophytes
- Clade: Angiosperms
- Clade: Eudicots
- Clade: Rosids
- Order: Myrtales
- Family: Lythraceae
- Genus: Rotala
- Species: R. andamanensis

Binomial name
- Rotala andamanensis S.P.Mathew & Lakshmin.

Species of wetland plant

Rotala andamanensis is a lesser-known endemic wetland plant species of the Andaman Islands in the Bay of Bengal belonging to the family Lythraceae. The type locality of this species is Wright Myo, the southern slope of the Mount Harriet Hill ranges. This is a rather rare species found to occur along the wetland area of the region. The specimens were originally collected by Balakrishnan of the Botanical Survey of India and described by Sam Mathew and Lakshminarashimhan of the same institution in 1992.
