= Kozhibazar =

- Village
- Location in Kerala, India Kozhibazar (India)
- Coordinates: 12°1′0″N 75°15′35″E
- Country: India
- State: Kerala
- District: Kannur

Government
  - Type: Democratic
  - Body: Madayi Panchayath

Languages
  - Official: Malayalam,
- Time zone: UTC+5:30 (IST)
- PIN: 670304
- Telephone code: 0497287****
- ISO 3166 code: IN-KL
- Vehicle registration: KL-13
- Nearest city: Kannur
- Lok Sabha constituency: Kasaragode

KozhiBazar is a small village approximately 23 kilometers (14 mi) north of Kannur town, in Kerala, South India.

== Administration ==
This village comes under Madayi Panchayat.

== Geography ==
An historic monument, Sulthan Canal, flows through the northern side of the village, which was said to be made by Tippu Sultan for his transportation between Pazhayangadi River and Moolakkeel River.

== Transportation ==
The national highway passes through Taliparamba town. Goa and Mumbai can be accessed on the northern side and Cochin and Thiruvananthapuram can be accessed on the southern side. The road to the east of Iritty connects to Mysore and Bangalore. The nearest railway station is Pazhayangadi on Mangalore-Palakkad line. Trains are available to almost all parts of India subject to advance booking over the internet. There are airports at Mangalore and Calicut. Both of them are international airports but direct flights are available only to Middle Eastern countries.
