= Lepidagathis sessilifolia =

Scientific classification
- Kingdom: Plantae
- Clade: Tracheophytes
- Clade: Angiosperms
- Clade: Eudicots
- Clade: Asterids
- Order: Lamiales
- Family: Acanthaceae
- Genus: Lepidagathis
- Species: L. sessilifolia

Binomial name
- Lepidagathis sessilifolia (Pohl) Kameyama ex Wassh. & J.R.I.Wood (2004)

Synonyms
- Lophostachys sessilifolia Pohl (1831); Lophostachys pubiflora Lindau (1897)

Species of flowering plant

Lepidagathis sessilifolia is a plant native to the Cerrado vegetation of Brazil and Bolivia. This plant is cited in Flora Brasiliensis by Carl Friedrich Philipp von Martius.
