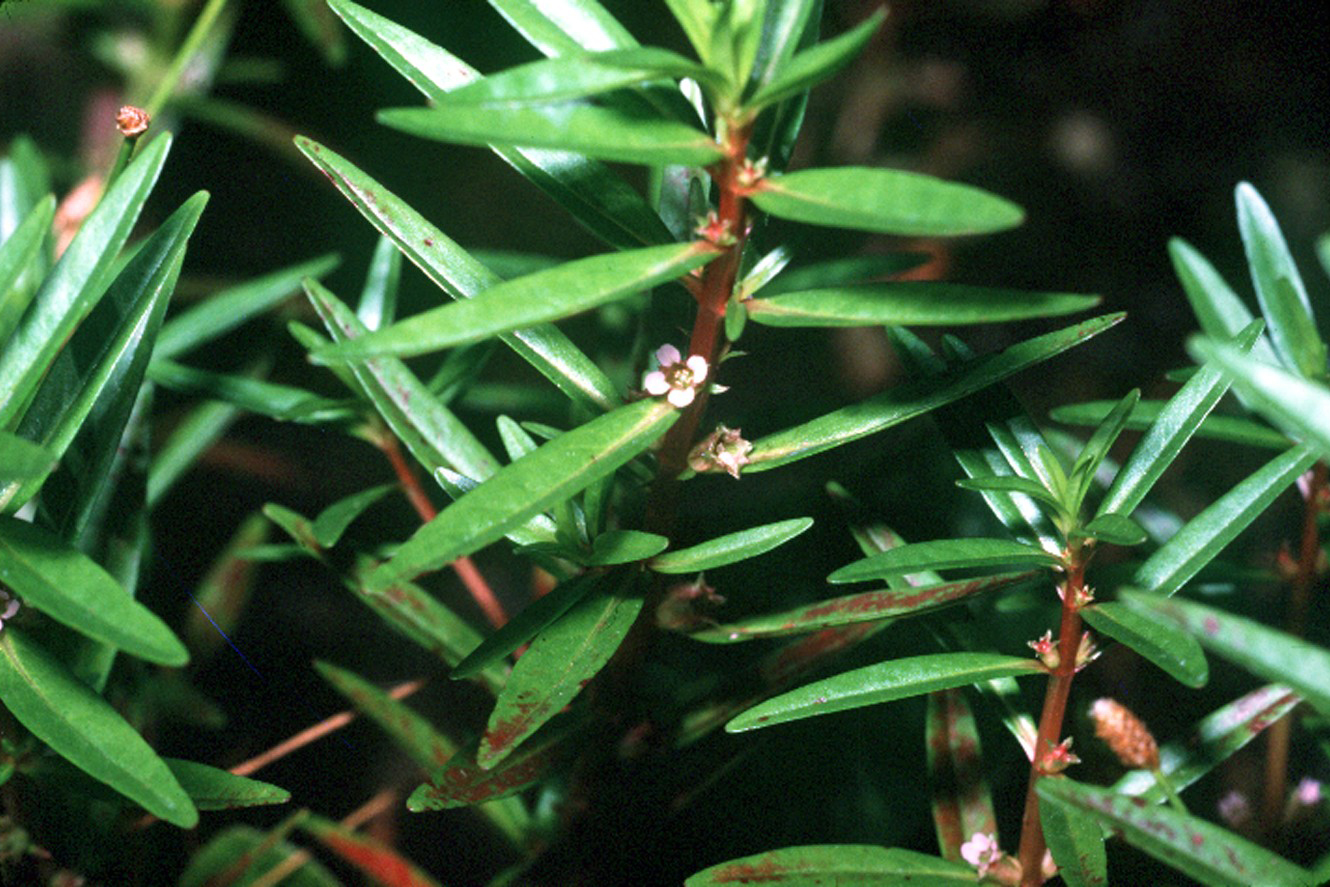

Conservation status
- Secure (NatureServe)

Scientific classification
- Kingdom: Plantae
- Clade: Tracheophytes
- Clade: Angiosperms
- Clade: Eudicots
- Clade: Rosids
- Order: Myrtales
- Family: Lythraceae
- Genus: Rotala
- Species: R. ramosior

Binomial name
- Rotala ramosior (L.) Koehne

Synonyms
- List: Ammannia catholica Hook. & Arn. ex Seem.; Ammannia dentifera A.Gray; Ammannia humilis Michx.; Ammannia linearifolia Raf.; Ammannia monoflora Blanco; Ammannia multicaulis Raf.; Ammannia occidentalis (Spreng.) DC.; Ammannia occidentalis var. pygmaea Chapm.; Ammannia ramosa Hill; Ammannia ramosior L.; Boykiana humilis (Michx.) Raf.; Boykinia humilis Raf. ex S.Watson; Peplis occidentalis Spreng.; Rotala dentifera (A.Gray) Koehne; Rotala ramosior var. dentifera (A.Gray) Lundell; Rotala ramosior var. interior Fernald & Griscom; Rotala ramosior var. typica Fernald & Griscom

= Rotala ramosior =

Aquatic plant species in the loosestrife family

Rotala ramosior is a species of flowering plant in the loosestrife family known by the common name lowland rotala. This aquatic or semiaquatic plant is native to North America, where it grows in lakes, streams, and irrigation ditches. The branching stems of the plant grow to about 40 cm long. Leaves are decussate, arranged oppositely in perpendicular pairs along the stems. The leaves are linear to lance-shaped to oval and up to 5 cm long. Flowers occur singly in leaf axils. Each has triangular sepals with long, narrow appendages and usually four tiny white petals in shades of pink to white. This plant is sometimes grown in aquariums.
