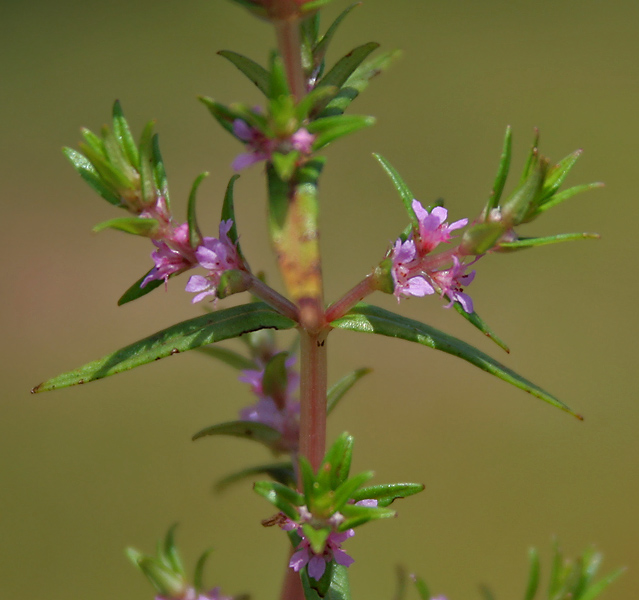
- Rotala densiflora

Scientific classification
- Kingdom: Plantae
- Clade: Tracheophytes
- Clade: Angiosperms
- Clade: Eudicots
- Clade: Rosids
- Order: Myrtales
- Family: Lythraceae
- Subfamily: Lythroideae
- Genus: Rotala

Species
- ~46, see text

= Rotala (plant) =

Genus of flowering plants

Rotala is a genus of plants in the loosestrife family. Several species are used as aquarium plants.

Species include:

- Rotala anamika Lemiya
- Rotala andamanensis S.P.Mathew & Lakshmin.
- Rotala baileyana Rogi, Joby, Rogimon, Nisha & I.Antony
- Rotala belgaumensis S.R.Yadav, Malpure & Chandore
- Rotala biglandulosa Arun Pr. & Sardesai
- Rotala capensis (Harv.) A.Fern. & Diniz
- Rotala cheruchakkiensis Anto, Devikrishna, Pulickal, C.D.Varghese & I.Antony
- Rotala cookii K.T.Joseph & Sivar.
- Rotala cordata Koehne
- Rotala cordipetala R.E.Fr.
- Rotala densiflora (Roth) Koehne
- Rotala dhaneshiana Sunil, Ratheesh & Sivad.
- Rotala diandra (F.Muell.) F.Muell.
- Rotala dinteri Koehne
- Rotala elatinoides Hiern
- Rotala filiformis (Bellardi) Hiern
- Rotala fimbriata Wight
- Rotala floribunda (Wight) Koehne
- Rotala fluitans Pohnert
- Rotala fontinalis Hiern
- Rotala fysonii Blatt. & Hallb.
- Rotala gerardii Boutique
- Rotala gossweileri Koehne
- Rotala halophila H.Perrier
- Rotala hexandra Koehne
- Rotala hippuris Makino
- Rotala hutchinsoniana A.Fern.
- Rotala illecebroides (Arn.) Koehne
- Rotala indica (Willd.) Koehne
- Rotala juniperina A.Fern.
- Rotala kanayensis Rijuraj, Rajendrapr., Shaju & Pandur.
- Rotala kasaragodensis K.S.Prasad & Raveendran
- Rotala khaleeliana Sunil, Ratheesh & Nandakumar
- Rotala letouzeyana Bamps
- Rotala longistyla Gibbs
- Rotala lucalensis A.Fern. & Diniz
- Rotala macrandra Koehne
- Rotala malabarica Pradeep, K.T.Joseph & Sivar.
- Rotala malampuzhensis R.V.Nair ex C.D.K.Cook
- Rotala meenkulamensis K.S.Prasad & Raveendran
- Rotala mexicana Schltdl. & Cham.
- Rotala milne-redheadii A.Fern. & Diniz
- Rotala myriophylloides Welw. ex Hiern
- Rotala nashii A.Fern.
- Rotala nummularia Welw. ex Hiern
- Rotala occultiflora Koehne
- Rotala protracta W.J.de Wilde & Duyfjes
- Rotala pseudojuniperina Lekhak & S.R.Yadav
- Rotala pterocalyx A.Raynal
- Rotala ramosior (L.) Koehne
- Rotala repens (Hochst.) Koehne
- Rotala ritchiei Koehne
- Rotala rosea (Poir.) C.D.K.Cook
- Rotala rotundifolia (Buch.-Ham. ex Roxb.) Koehne
- Rotala rubra (Buch.-Ham. ex D.Don) H.Hara
- Rotala sahyadrica S.P.Gaikwad, Sardesai & S.R.Yadav
- Rotala saxatilis W.J.de Wilde & Duyfjes
- Rotala serpiculoides Welw. ex Hiern
- Rotala serpyllifolia (Roth) Bremek.
- Rotala simpliciuscula (Kurz) Koehne
- Rotala smithii A.Fern. & Diniz
- Rotala stagnina Hiern
- Rotala stipulata Blatt. & Hallb.
- Rotala stuhlmannii Koehne
- Rotala subrotunda (Wall. ex Kurz) Koehne
- Rotala taiwaniana Y.C.Liu & F.Y.Lu
- Rotala tenella (Guill. & Perr.) Hiern
- Rotala thymoides Exell
- Rotala tripartita Beesley
- Rotala tulunadensis K.S.Prasad, P.Biju, Raveendran & K.G.Bhat
- Rotala vasudevanii K.T.Joseph & Sivar.
- Rotala verdcourtii A.Fern.
- Rotala verticillaris L.
- Rotala wallichii (Hook.f.) Koehne
- Rotala welwitschii Exell
