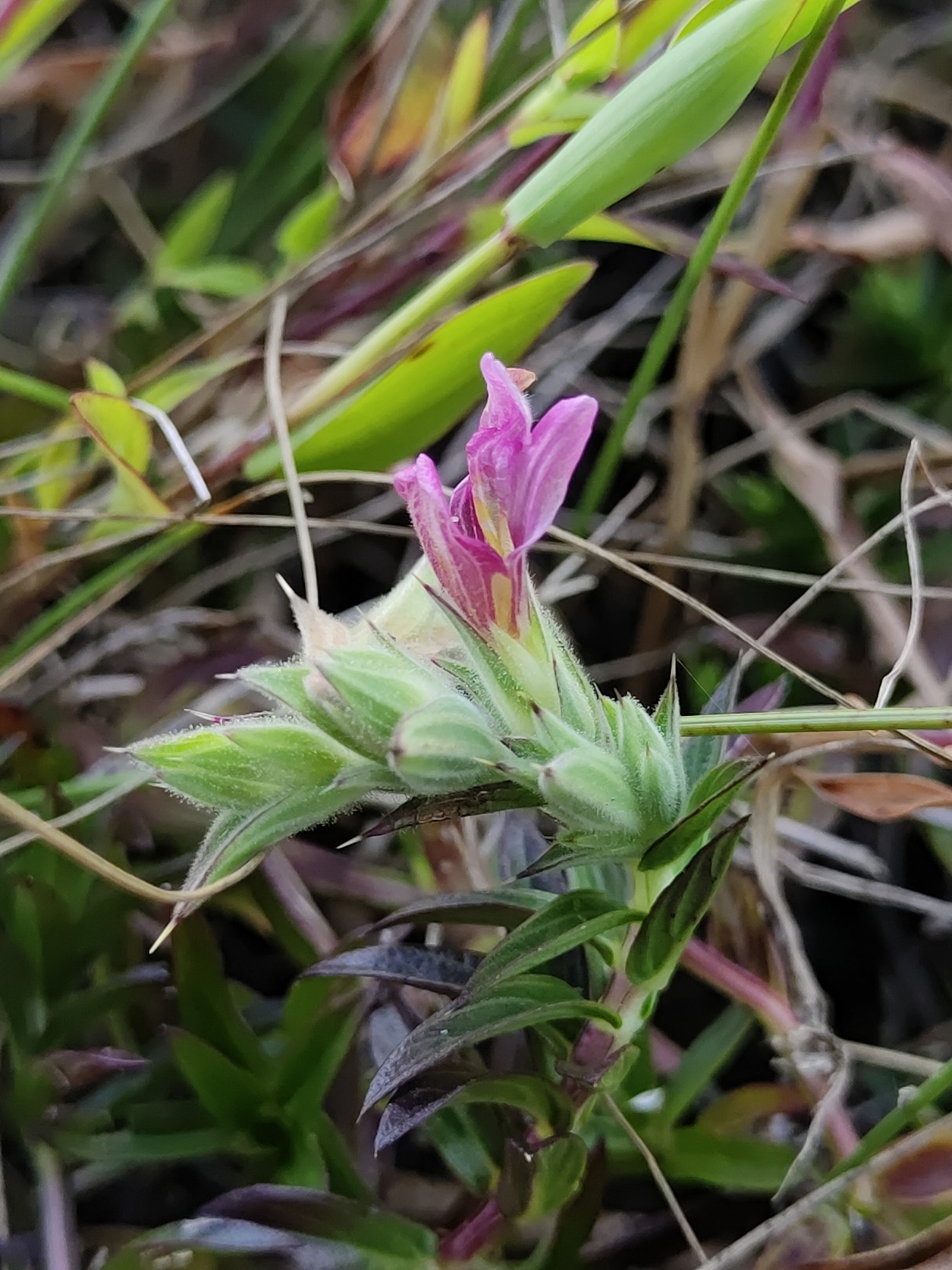

Scientific classification
- Kingdom: Plantae
- Clade: Tracheophytes
- Clade: Angiosperms
- Clade: Eudicots
- Clade: Asterids
- Order: Lamiales
- Family: Acanthaceae
- Genus: Lepidagathis
- Species: L. narasimhanii

Binomial name
- Lepidagathis narasimhanii Gnanasek., A.F.J.King & Arisdason

= Lepidagathis narasimhanii =

Species of flowering plant

Lepidagathis narasimhanii is a species of plant in the family Acanthaceae.

== Description ==
The plant has spreading stems, which root at the nodes. Young stems are green to purplish and become ash-coloured with age. They are well-branched, 4-angled, and hirsute when young but glabrous when mature. Leaves are sessile and opposite-decussate. Vegetative leaves are lanceolate to lance-ovate. The inflorescence is a terminal spike and green to purplish-brown in colour.
