= Lepidagathis cyanea =

Scientific classification
- Kingdom: Plantae
- Clade: Tracheophytes
- Clade: Angiosperms
- Clade: Eudicots
- Clade: Asterids
- Order: Lamiales
- Family: Acanthaceae
- Genus: Lepidagathis
- Species: L. cyanea

Binomial name
- Lepidagathis cyanea (Leonard) Kameyama (2008 publ. 2009)

Synonyms
- Lophostachys cyanea Leonard (1959)

Species of flowering plant

Lepidagathis cyanea is a plant native to the Cerrado vegetation of Brazil.
