= Lepidagathis laxifolia =

Scientific classification
- Kingdom: Plantae
- Clade: Tracheophytes
- Clade: Angiosperms
- Clade: Eudicots
- Clade: Asterids
- Order: Lamiales
- Family: Acanthaceae
- Genus: Lepidagathis
- Species: L. laxifolia

Binomial name
- Lepidagathis laxifolia (Nees) Kameyama (2008 publ. 2009)

Synonyms
- Lophostachys laxifolia Nees (1847); Lophostachys patula Mart. (1847)

Species of flowering plant

Lepidagathis laxiflora is a plant native to the Cerrado vegetation of Brazil. This plant is cited in Flora Brasiliensis by Carl Friedrich Philipp von Martius.
