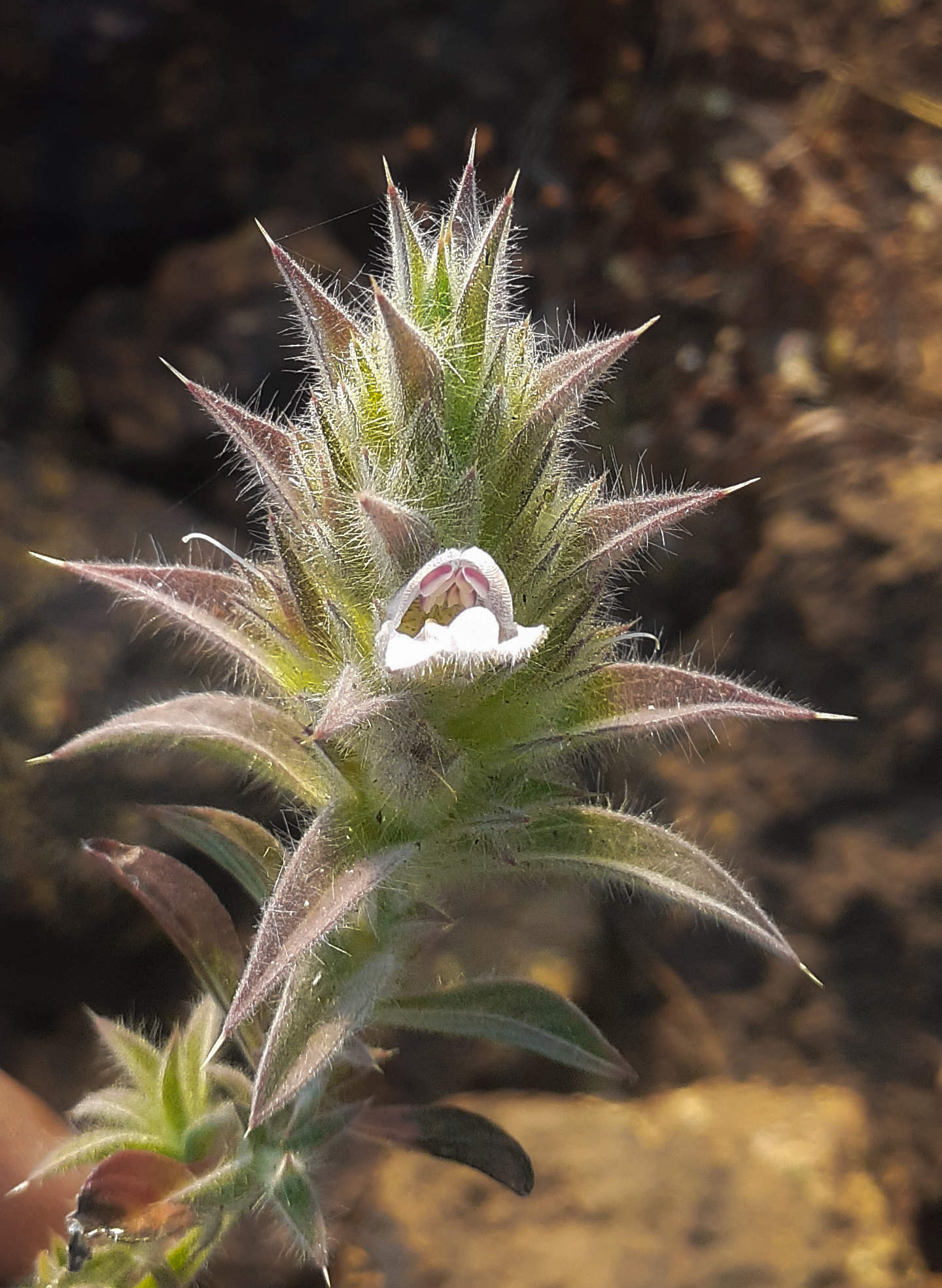
- Lepidagathis dalzelliana spike close up

Scientific classification
- Kingdom: Plantae
- Clade: Tracheophytes
- Clade: Angiosperms
- Clade: Eudicots
- Clade: Asterids
- Order: Lamiales
- Family: Acanthaceae
- Genus: Lepidagathis
- Species: L. dalzelliana

Binomial name
- Lepidagathis dalzelliana S. More, Mane, M. Sawant & H. S. Bhosale

= Lepidagathis dalzelliana =

Species of plant

Lepidagathis dalzelliana is a species of flowering plant.

== Phenology ==
Flowering and Fruiting : November to April

== Range ==
Known distribution is on the plateaus of Satara district namely Mhavashi, Kaas, and Chalkewadi Plateau, and is endemic to the state of Maharashtra.

== Habitat and Ecology ==
Lepidagathis dalzelliana grows on high-altitude lateritic plateaus from 1000 to 1298 m a.s.l., in accumulated soil and among small stone boulders in association with Ischaemum impressum, Lepidagathis mahakassapae, Justicia trinervia and Blumea malcolmii. It was also observed that Crematogaster sp. ants were feeding and passing the nectar droplets to each other.

== Etymology ==
The species is named after Nicol Alexander Dalzell conservator of forests and superintendent of the Botanical Gardens in the Bombay Presidency, to honor his work and contributions to the field of the botany of Western Maharashtra.
