= Lepidagathis montana =

Scientific classification
- Kingdom: Plantae
- Clade: Tracheophytes
- Clade: Angiosperms
- Clade: Eudicots
- Clade: Asterids
- Order: Lamiales
- Family: Acanthaceae
- Genus: Lepidagathis
- Species: L. montana

Binomial name
- Lepidagathis montana (Mart. ex Nees) Kameyama (2008 publ. 2009)

Synonyms
- Lophostachys montana Mart. ex Nees (1847); Lophostachys villosa Pohl (1831)

Species of flowering plant

Lepidagathis montana is a species of plant in the acanthus family, Acanthaceae. It is native to central Brazil, including the Espinhaço Range of Minas Gerais state northward to the Chapada Diamantina of Bahia state, and in the Federal District, Goias, and southern Maranhão. It grows in gallery forest and cerrado (savanna) in the southern part of its range. In the northern part of its range in Bahia state it grows in campo rupestre (montane grassland on sandy soil) and scrubland.

This plant is cited in Flora Brasiliensis by Carl Friedrich Philipp von Martius. The Latin specific epithet montana refers to mountains or coming from mountains.
