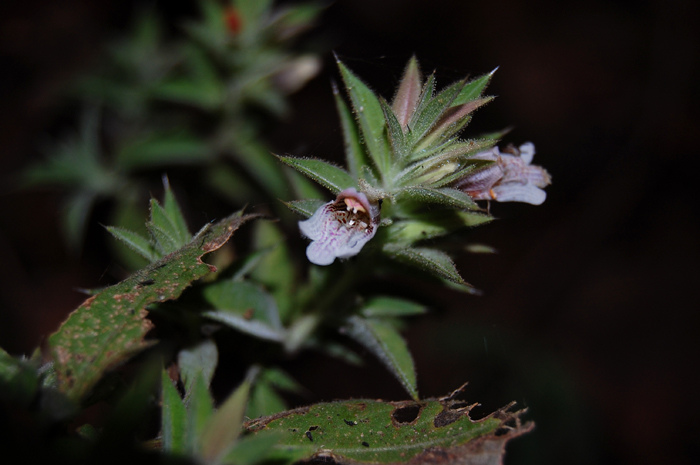
- Lepidagathis cuspidata

Scientific classification
- Kingdom: Plantae
- Clade: Tracheophytes
- Clade: Angiosperms
- Clade: Eudicots
- Clade: Asterids
- Order: Lamiales
- Family: Acanthaceae
- Subfamily: Acanthoideae
- Tribe: Barlerieae
- Genus: Lepidagathis; Willd.

Species
- 156; see text

Synonyms
- Acanthura Lindau (1901); Lindauea Rendle (1896); Lophostachys Pohl (1831); Russeggera Endl. (1839); Teliostachya Nees (1847); Volkensiophyton Lindau (1894); Zahlbrucknera Pohl ex Nees (1847), not validly publ.

= Lepidagathis =

Species of plant

Lepidagathis is a genus of flowering plants in the family Acanthaceae. It includes 156 species native to the tropics of the Americas, sub-Saharan Africa, south and southeast Asia, southern China, Malesia, and New Guinea.

== Species ==
156 species are accepted.

- Lepidagathis alopecuroidea (Vahl) R.Br. ex Griseb.
- Lepidagathis alvarezia (Nees) Kameyama ex Wassh. & J.R.I.Wood
- Lepidagathis amaranthoides Elmer
- Lepidagathis ananthapuramensis V.S.A.Kumar, P.Biju, Sindu Arya, Josekutty & Augustine
- Lepidagathis andersoniana Lindau
- Lepidagathis angustifolia C.B.Clarke
- Lepidagathis anobrya Nees
- Lepidagathis appendiculata Lindau
- Lepidagathis aristata Nees
- Lepidagathis armata Lindau
- Lepidagathis backeri Bremek.
- Lepidagathis balakrishnanii Remadevi & Binoj Kumar
- Lepidagathis bandraensis Blatt.
- Lepidagathis barberi Gamble
- Lepidagathis benojiana Jithin & Jose
- Lepidagathis billardiereana Nees
- Lepidagathis boholensis Y.S.Liang, S.T.Geng, Evangel. & J.C.Wang
- Lepidagathis brevis Benoist
- Lepidagathis brevispica Bremek.
- Lepidagathis callistachys Kameyama
- Lepidagathis calycina Hochst. ex Nees
- Lepidagathis cambodiana Benoist
- Lepidagathis capituliformis Benoist
- Lepidagathis cataractae (Nees) Lindau ex Pulle
- Lepidagathis ceylanica Nees
- Lepidagathis chariensis Benoist
- Lepidagathis chevalieri Benoist
- Lepidagathis chiapensis (Acosta) Kameyama
- Lepidagathis chlorostachya Nees
- Lepidagathis cinerea Merr.
- Lepidagathis clarkei Merr.
- Lepidagathis clavata Dalzell
- Lepidagathis collina (Endl.) Milne-Redh.
- Lepidagathis cristata Willd.
- Lepidagathis cuneiformis Kameyama
- Lepidagathis cuspidata Nees
- Lepidagathis cyanea (Leonard) Kameyama
- Lepidagathis dahomensis Benoist
- Lepidagathis dalzelliana S.More, Mane, M.Sawant & H.S.Bhosale
- Lepidagathis danielii Cruz Durán & J.Jiménez Ram.
- Lepidagathis diffusa C.B.Clarke
- Lepidagathis dispar C.B.Clarke ex Merr.
- Lepidagathis dissimilis J.B.Imlay
- Lepidagathis diversa C.B.Clarke
- Lepidagathis dulcis Nees
- Lepidagathis dalzellii Nandikar & Bramhad.
- Lepidagathis dayanandanii A.F.J.King, Gnanasek. & Arisdason
- Lepidagathis epacridea Heine
- Lepidagathis eriocephala Lindau
- Lepidagathis eucephala Miq.
- Lepidagathis eugeniifolia Benoist
- Lepidagathis falcata Nees
- Lepidagathis fasciculata (Retz.) Nees
- Lepidagathis fimbriata C.B.Clarke
- Lepidagathis fischeri C.B.Clarke
- Lepidagathis floribunda (Pohl) Kameyama
- Lepidagathis formosensis C.B.Clarke ex Hayata
- Lepidagathis gandhii Gnanasek., A.F.J.King, S.M.Kasim & Arisdason
- Lepidagathis glandulosa Nees
- Lepidagathis gossweileri S.Moore
- Lepidagathis gracilis (Bremek.) Wassh.
- Lepidagathis grandidieri Benoist
- Lepidagathis guatemalensis (Donn.Sm.) Kameyama
- Lepidagathis hainanensis H.S.Lo
- Lepidagathis hamiltoniana Wall.
- Lepidagathis heudelotiana Nees
- Lepidagathis humifusa Decne.
- Lepidagathis humilis Merr.
- Lepidagathis inaequalis C.B.Clarke ex Elmer
- Lepidagathis incurva Buch.-Ham. ex D.Don
- Lepidagathis ipariaensis Wassh.
- Lepidagathis javanica Blume
- Lepidagathis kameyamana Gnanasek. & Arisdason
- Lepidagathis keralensis Madhus. & N.P.Singh
- Lepidagathis lanatoglabra C.B.Clarke
- Lepidagathis laxa Nees
- Lepidagathis laxifolia (Nees) Kameyama
- Lepidagathis lidaoensis S.S.Ying
- Lepidagathis linearis T.Anderson
- Lepidagathis linifolia Benoist
- Lepidagathis longisepala C.B.Clarke
- Lepidagathis lutea Dalzell
- Lepidagathis lutescens Benoist
- Lepidagathis macgregorii Merr.
- Lepidagathis macrantha C.B.Clarke
- Lepidagathis macrochila Lindau
- Lepidagathis madagascariensis Benoist
- Lepidagathis mahakassapae S.More, M.Sawant, H.S.Bhosale & Kambale
- Lepidagathis marginata Bremek.
- Lepidagathis mazarunensis (Bremek.) Wassh.
- Lepidagathis medicaginea (Bremek.) Wassh.
- Lepidagathis medusae S.Moore
- Lepidagathis mendax Benoist
- Lepidagathis meridionalis Kameyama
- Lepidagathis microphylla Merr.
- Lepidagathis mindorensis Merr.
- Lepidagathis mitis Dalzell
- Lepidagathis montana (Mart. ex Nees) Kameyama
- Lepidagathis mucida Benoist
- Lepidagathis narasimhanii Gnanasek., A.F.J.King & Arisdason
- Lepidagathis nemoralis (Mart. ex Nees) Kameyama
- Lepidagathis nemorosa S.Moore
- Lepidagathis nickeriensis Wassh.
- Lepidagathis oubanguiensis Benoist
- Lepidagathis palawanensis Merr.
- Lepidagathis palinensis S.S.Ying
- Lepidagathis pallescens S.Moore
- Lepidagathis papuana S.Moore
- Lepidagathis paraensis Kameyama
- Lepidagathis parviflora Blume
- Lepidagathis peniculifera S.Moore
- Lepidagathis perrieri Benoist
- Lepidagathis plantaginea Mildbr.
- Lepidagathis pobeguinii Hua
- Lepidagathis prostrata Dalzell
- Lepidagathis pseudoaristata Ensermu
- Lepidagathis psilantha Nees
- Lepidagathis purpuricaulis Nees
- Lepidagathis rajasekharae K.Prasad & A.M.Reddy
- Lepidagathis randii S.Moore
- Lepidagathis riedeliana Nees
- Lepidagathis rigida Dalzell
- Lepidagathis robinsonii Merr.
- Lepidagathis royenii Bremek.
- Lepidagathis rumphii Merr.
- Lepidagathis sabui Chandore, Borude, Madhav & S.R.Yadav
- Lepidagathis scabra C.B.Clarke
- Lepidagathis scariosa Nees
- Lepidagathis secunda Nees
- Lepidagathis sericea Benoist
- Lepidagathis sessilifolia (Pohl) Kameyama ex Wassh. & J.R.I.Wood
- Lepidagathis shrirangii Natekar, Kambale & Chandore
- Lepidagathis simplex T.Anderson
- Lepidagathis soconuscana (T.F.Daniel) Kameyama
- Lepidagathis sorongensis Bremek.
- Lepidagathis speciosa (Rendle) Hedrén
- Lepidagathis spicifer Elmer
- Lepidagathis spinosa Wight ex Nees
- Lepidagathis staurogynoides S.Moore
- Lepidagathis stenophylla C.B.Clarke ex Hayata
- Lepidagathis strobilina T.Anderson ex Kurz
- Lepidagathis subglabra Merr.
- Lepidagathis subinterrupta Merr.
- Lepidagathis submitis Blatt.
- Lepidagathis surinamensis (Bremek.) Wassh.
- Lepidagathis tenuis C.B.Clarke
- Lepidagathis thorelii Benoist
- Lepidagathis thymifolia Collett & Hemsl.
- Lepidagathis thyrsiflora Bremek.
- Lepidagathis tisserantii Benoist
- Lepidagathis trinervis Nees
- Lepidagathis ushae Borude, Gosavi & Chandore
- Lepidagathis uxpanapensis (Acosta) Kameyama
- Lepidagathis villosa Hedrén
- Lepidagathis vulpina Benoist
- Lepidagathis walkeriana Nees
- Lepidagathis wasshausenii Kameyama
