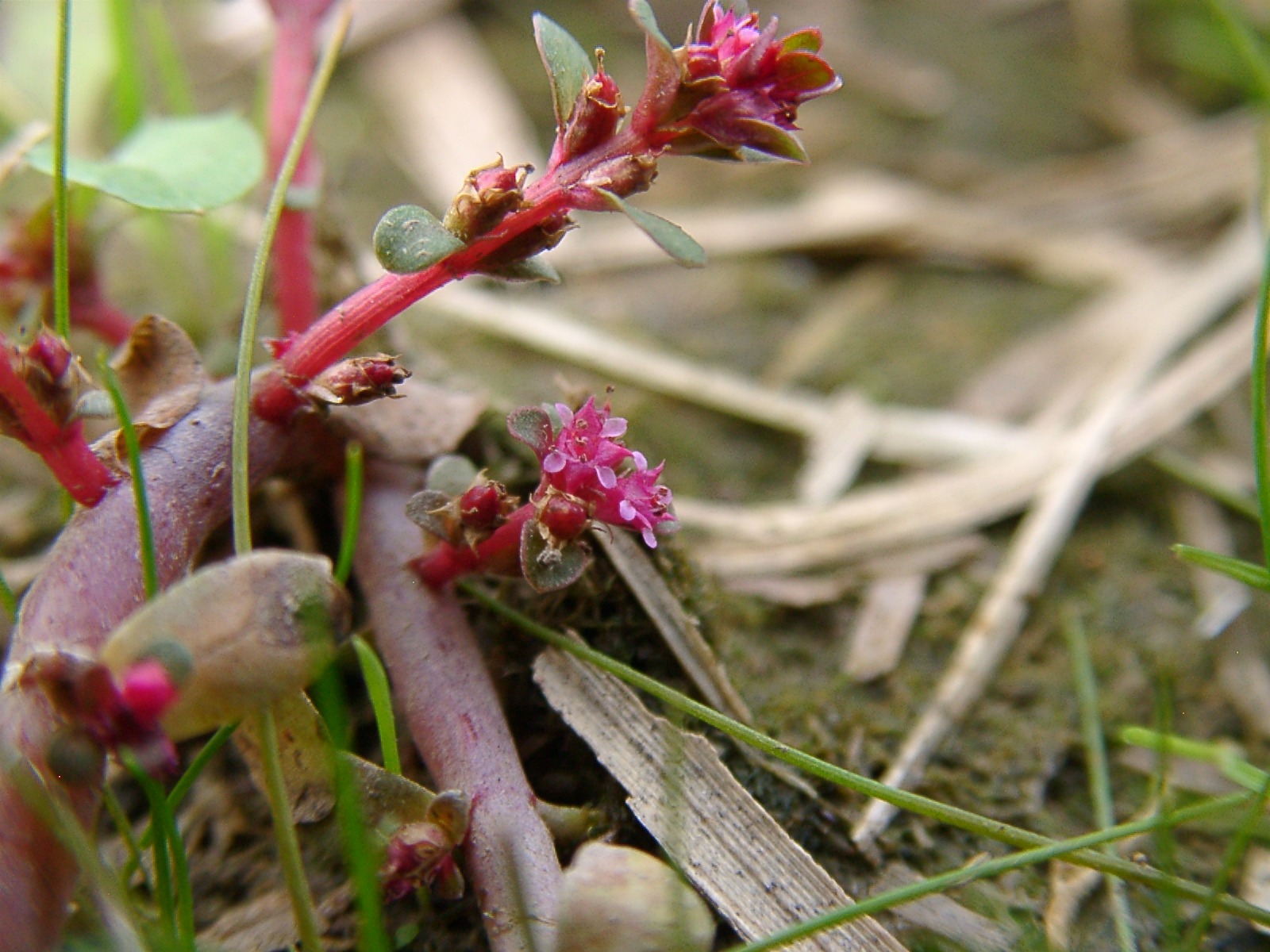

Scientific classification
- Kingdom: Plantae
- Clade: Tracheophytes
- Clade: Angiosperms
- Clade: Eudicots
- Clade: Rosids
- Order: Myrtales
- Family: Lythraceae
- Genus: Rotala
- Species: R. indica

Binomial name
- Rotala indica (Willd.) Koehne

= Rotala indica =

Species of flowering plant

Rotala indica is a species of flowering plant in the loosestrife family known by the common name Indian toothcup. It is native to Southeast Asia. This aquatic plant is best known as a popular aquarium plant and as a weed of rice fields. It is known as an introduced species and a weed in rice-growing regions in Congo, Italy, and Portugal, and California and Louisiana in the United States.

The stems of the plant grow up to 30 or 40 cm long. Leaves are decussate, arranged oppositely in perpendicular pairs along the stems. The leaves are oval with thick, whitish, cartilaginous margins and measure up to 2 cm long. Flowers occur in leaf axils singly or in short, spikelike inflorescences. Each has four triangular sepals and four tiny pink petals.
