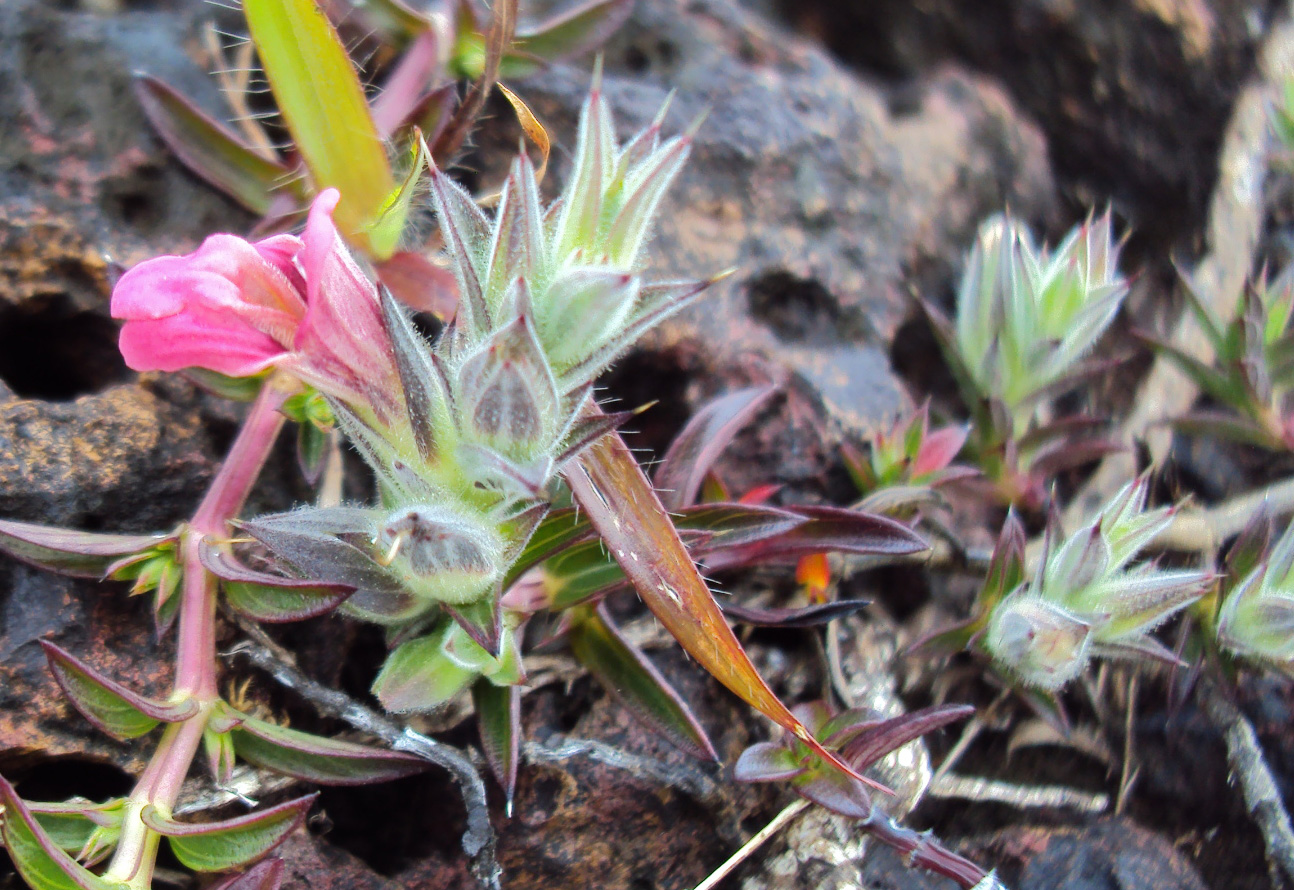

Scientific classification
- Kingdom: Plantae
- Clade: Tracheophytes
- Clade: Angiosperms
- Clade: Eudicots
- Clade: Asterids
- Order: Lamiales
- Family: Acanthaceae
- Genus: Lepidagathis
- Species: L. keralensis

Binomial name
- Lepidagathis keralensis Madhus. & N.P.Singh

= Lepidagathis keralensis =

Species of flowering plant

Lepidagathis keralensis is a plant species described by PV Madhusoodanan and NP Singh. Lepidagathis keralensis is included in the genus Lepidagathis and the family Acanthaceae. No subspecies are listed in the Catalog of Life.

== Gallery ==
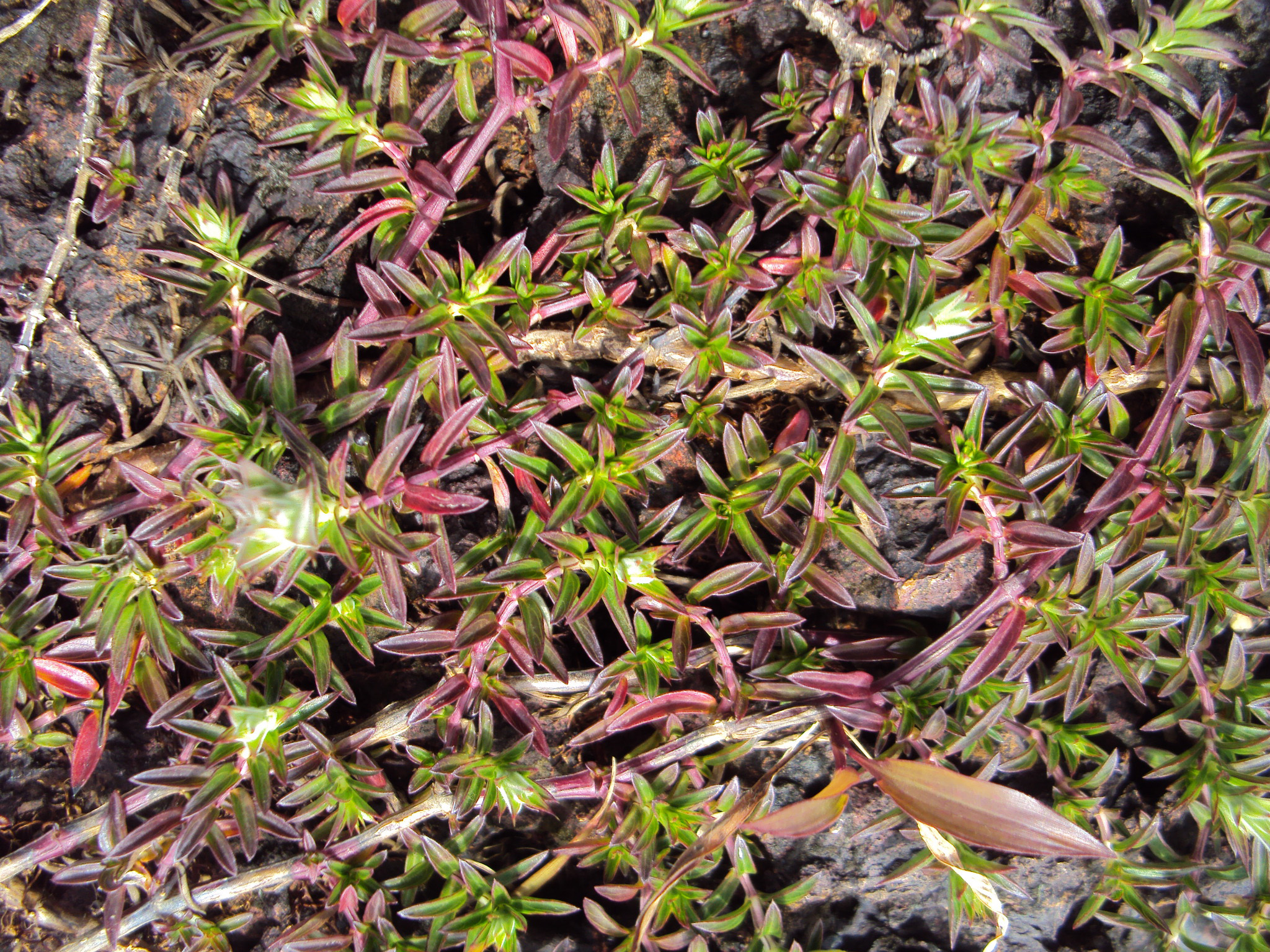

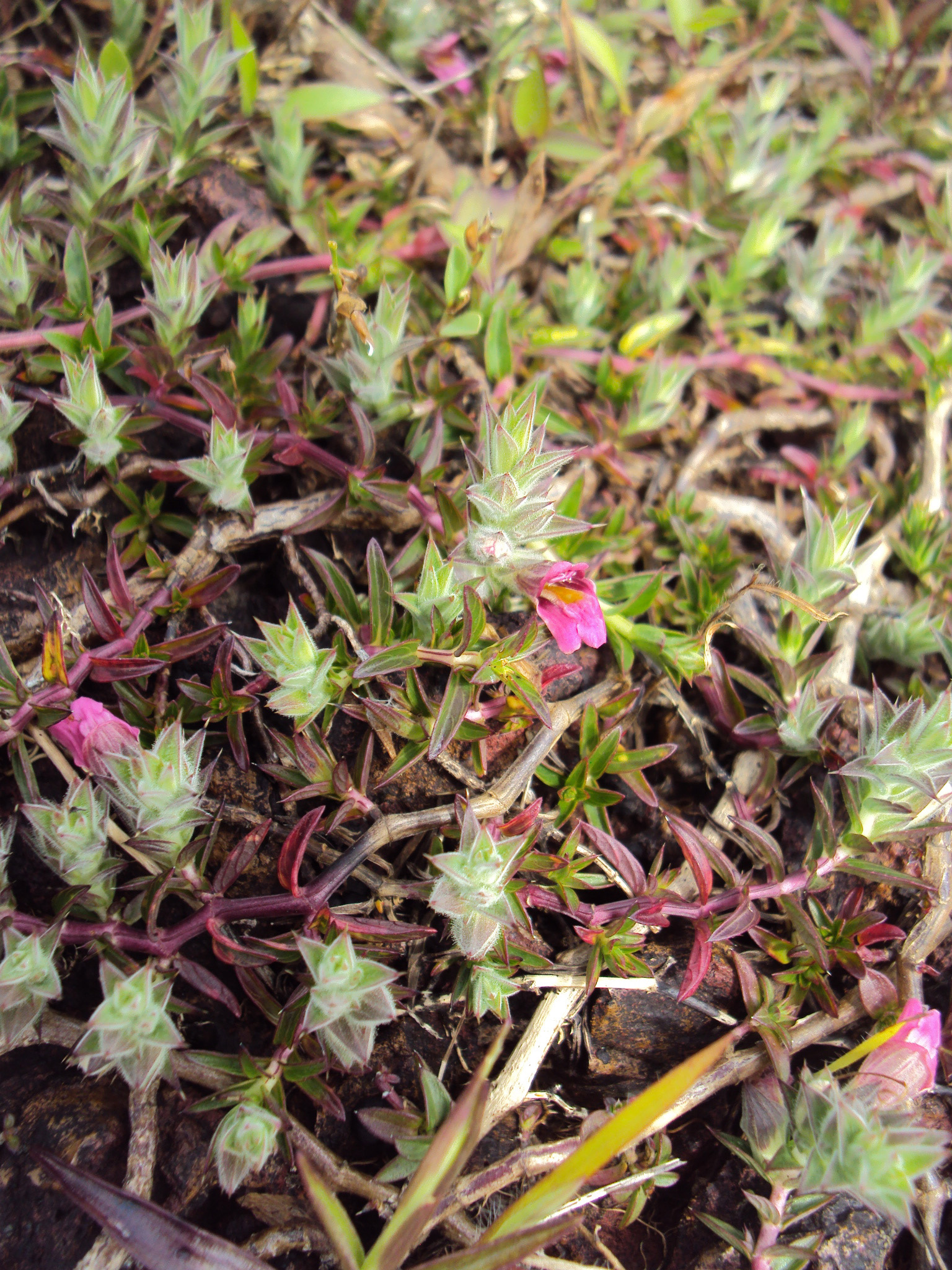

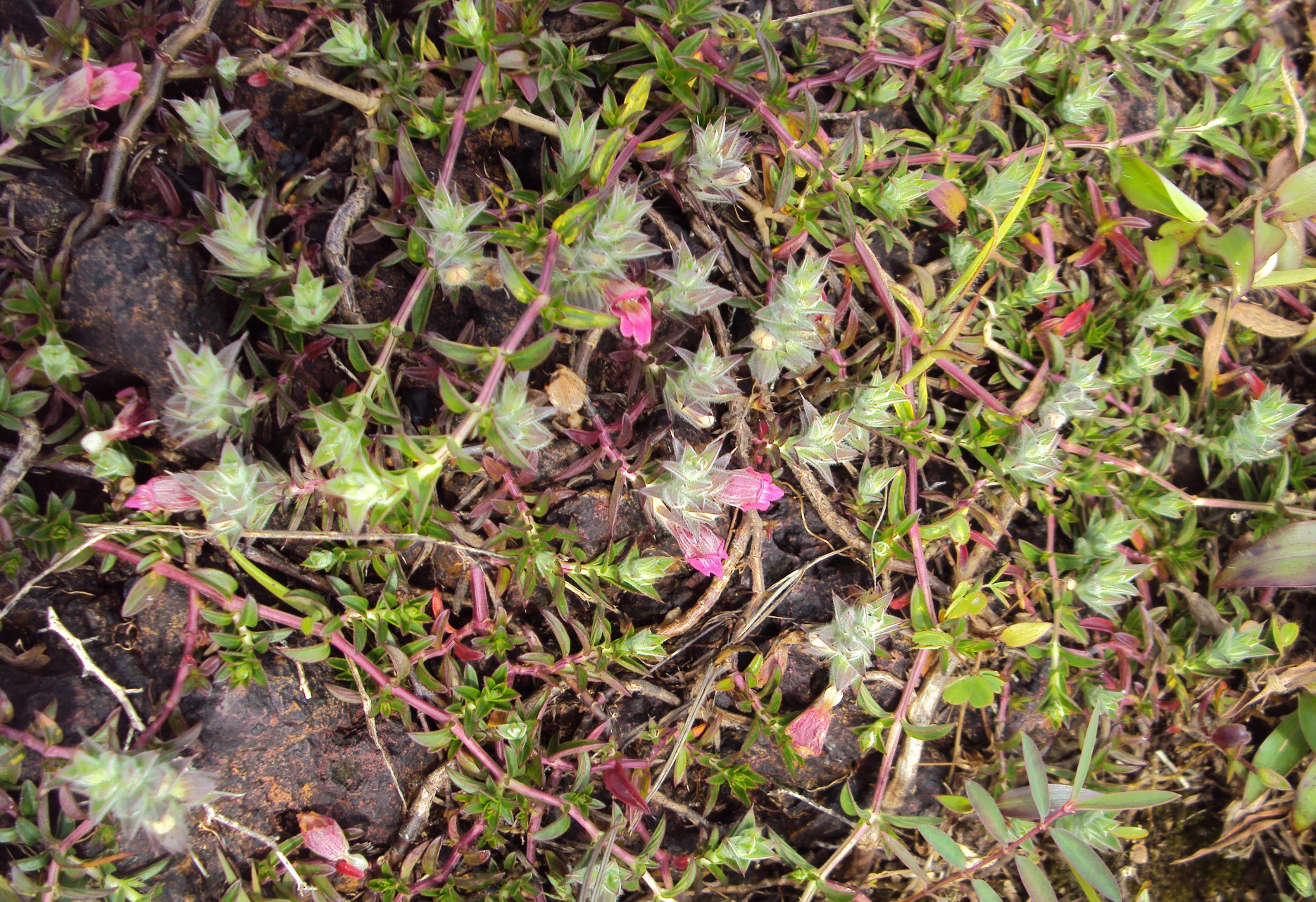

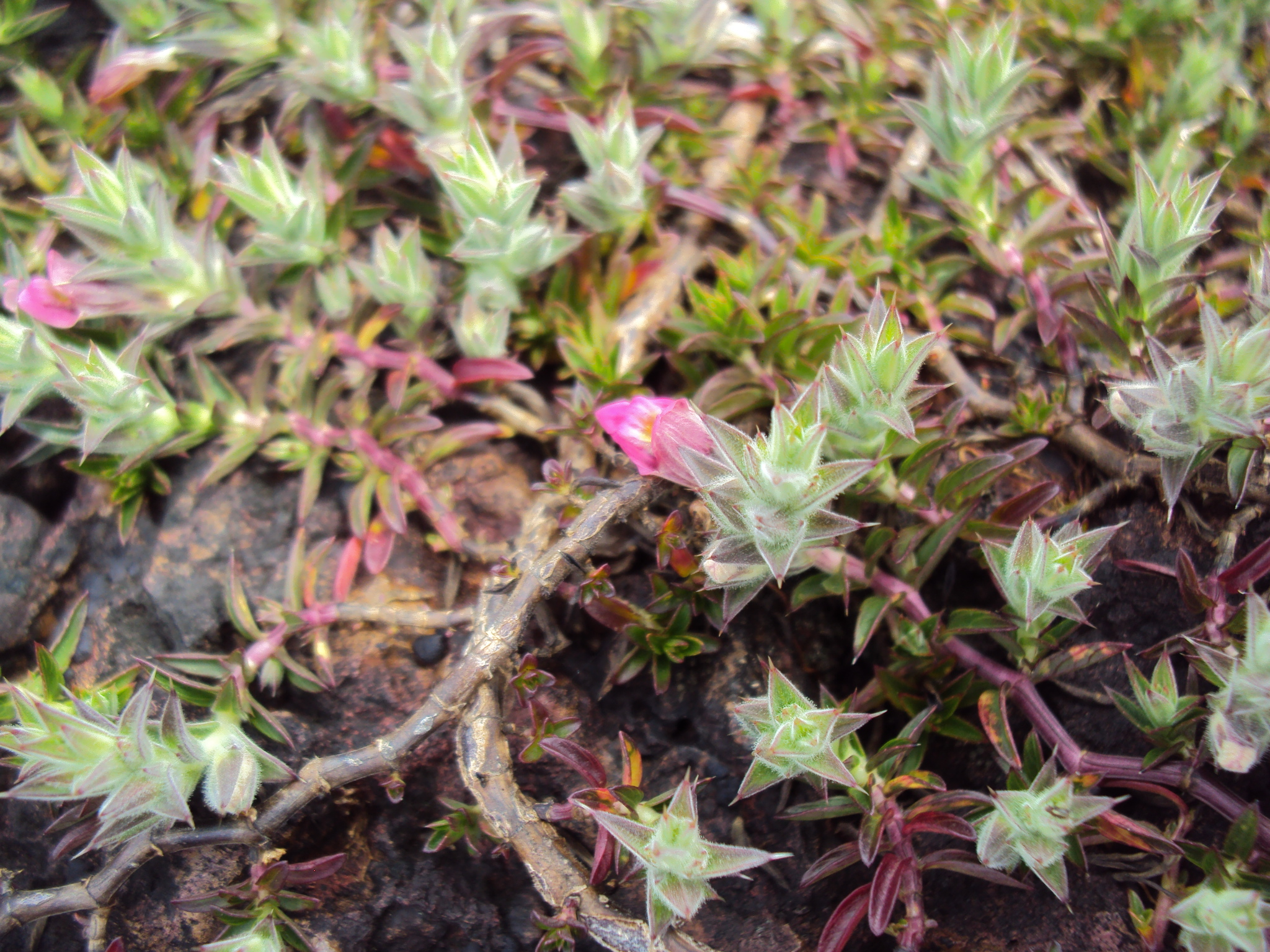

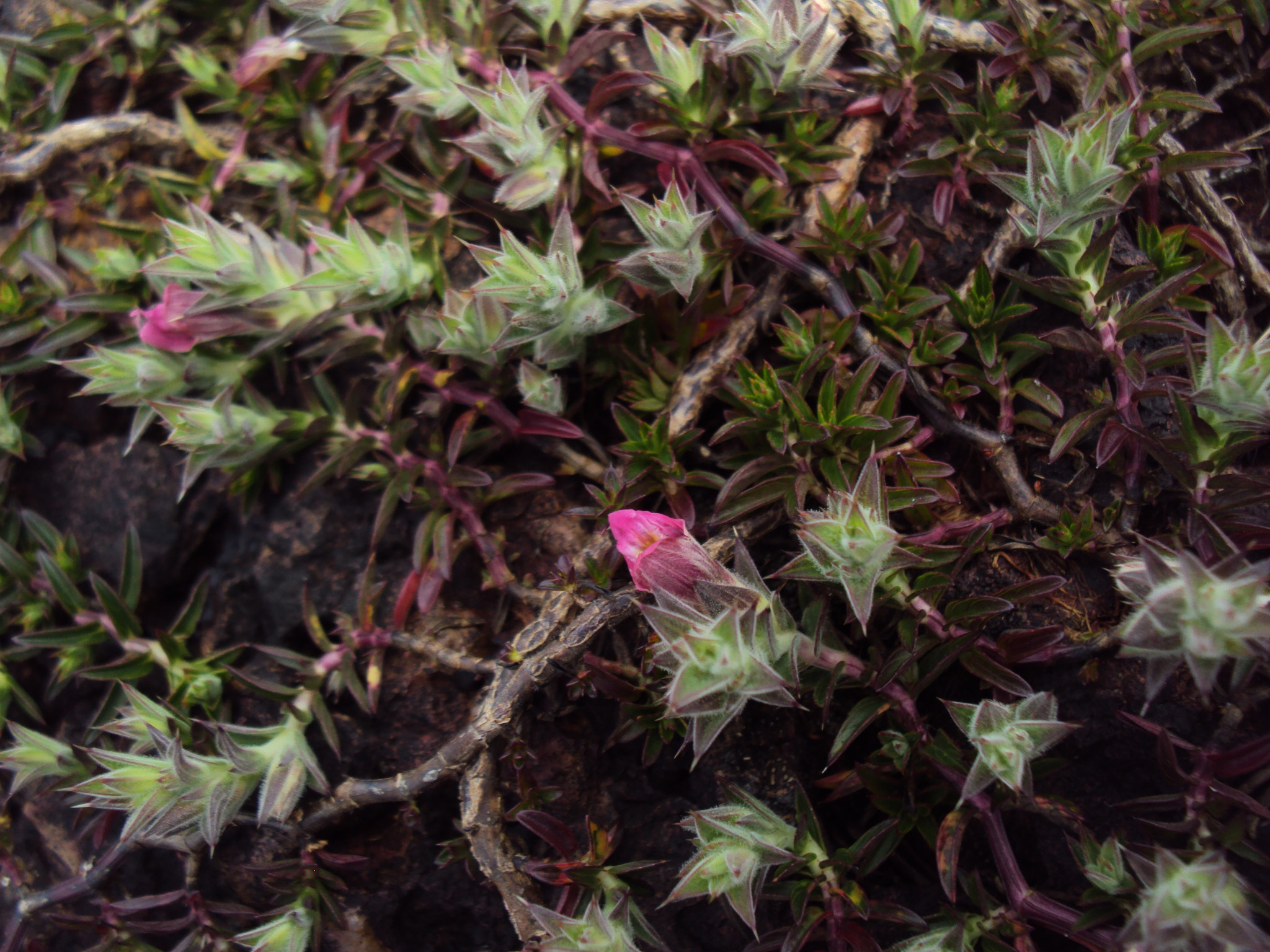

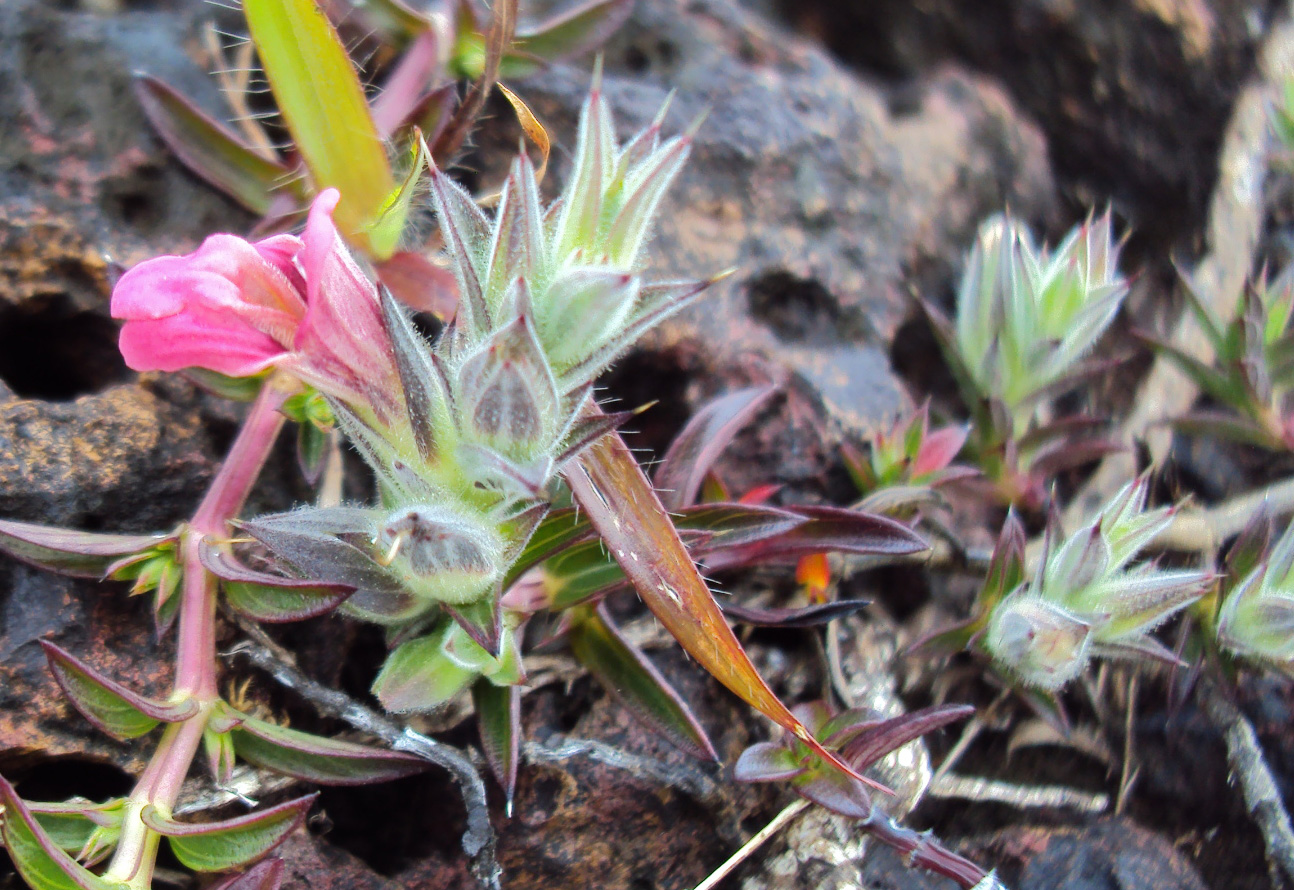
