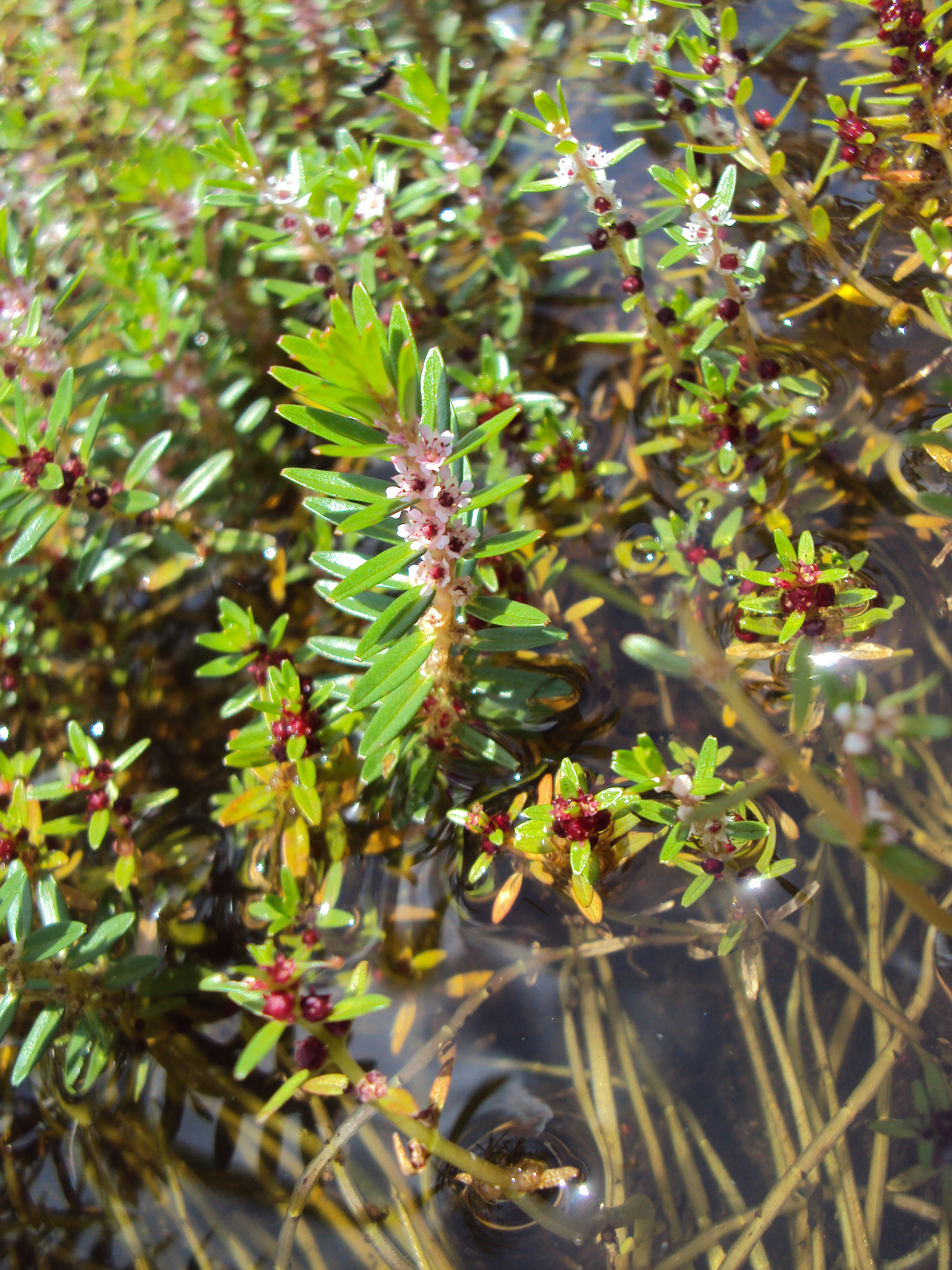
- Malabar rotala from Madayipara

Conservation status
- Critically Endangered (IUCN 3.1)

Scientific classification
- Kingdom: Plantae
- Clade: Tracheophytes
- Clade: Angiosperms
- Clade: Eudicots
- Clade: Rosids
- Order: Myrtales
- Family: Lythraceae
- Genus: Rotala
- Species: R. malabarica

Binomial name
- Rotala malabarica Pradeep, K.T.Joseph & Sivar.

= Rotala malabarica =

Malabar rotala

Species of flowering plant

Rotala malabarica, the Malabar rotala, is a short-lived annual plant endemic to southern India, where it is known from only one location. It is considered critically endangered and may be extinct.

== Distribution and habitat ==
This species appears to occur only in an extremely restricted area (~10 km^{2}) in the Kannur District in Kerala, India, from where it was described in 1990. It inhabits seasonal pools in depressions containing rich deposits of humus. The substrate is laterite rocks, and the Malabar rotala is likely to be threatened by lateritic mining, in addition to herbicide use in the adjoining cashew plantations. It has not been found in its type locality since its description.
