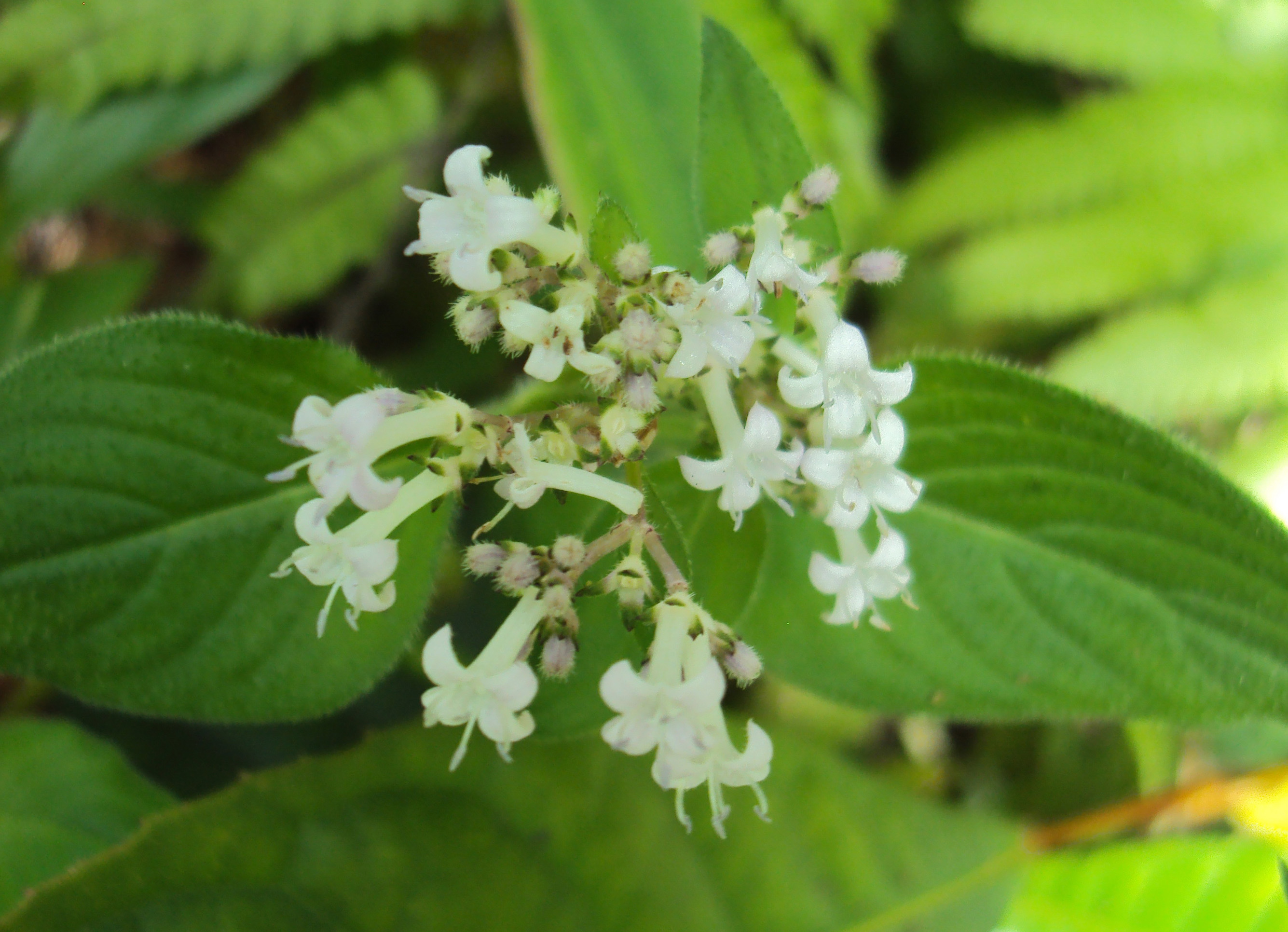
- Neanotis decipiens displaying flowers.

Scientific classification
- Kingdom: Plantae
- Clade: Tracheophytes
- Clade: Angiosperms
- Clade: Eudicots
- Clade: Asterids
- Order: Gentianales
- Family: Rubiaceae
- Genus: Neanotis; W.H.Lewis

= Neanotis =

Genus of plants

Neanotis is a genus of flowering plants belonging to the family Rubiaceae, and the major group Angiosperms.

Its native range is Tropical and Subtropical Asia.

== Species ==
Species:

- Neanotis boerhavioides (Hance) W.H.Lewis
- Neanotis calycina (Wall. ex Hook.f.) W.H.Lewis
- Neanotis carnosa (Dalzell) W.H.Lewis
- Neanotis decipiens (Hook.f.) W.H.Lewis
- Neanotis formosana (Hayata) W.H.Lewis
- Neanotis gracilis (Hook.f.) W.H.Lewis
- Neanotis hirsuta (L.f.) W.H.Lewis
- Neanotis hondae (H.Hara) W.H.Lewis
- Neanotis indica (DC.) W.H.Lewis
- Neanotis ingrata (Wall. ex Hook.f.) W.H.Lewis
- Neanotis kwangtungensis (Merr. & F.P.Metcalf) W.H.Lewis
- Neanotis lancifolia (Hook.f.) W.H.Lewis
- Neanotis latifolia Deb & Ratna Dutta
- Neanotis longiflora W.H.Lewis
- Neanotis monosperma (Wight & Arn.) W.H.Lewis
- Neanotis montholonii (Hook.f.) W.H.Lewis
- Neanotis nana (Merr. & L.M.Perry) N.Wikstr. & Neupane
- Neanotis nummularia (Arn.) W.H.Lewis
- Neanotis nummulariiformis (Arn.) W.H.Lewis
- Neanotis oxyphylla (Wall. ex G.Don) W.H.Lewis
- Neanotis pahompokae (Fukuoka) N.Wikstr. & Neupane
- Neanotis prainiana (Talbot) W.H.Lewis
- Neanotis rheedei (Wight & Arn.) W.H.Lewis
- Neanotis rhombicarpa T.Yamaz.
- Neanotis richardiana (Arn.) W.H.Lewis
- Neanotis ritchiei (Hook.f.) W.H.Lewis
- Neanotis sahyadrica Billore & S.K.Mudaliar
- Neanotis subtilis (Miq.) Govaerts ex Punekar & Lakshmin.
- Neanotis thwaitesiana (Hance) W.H.Lewis
- Neanotis trichoclada (Merr. & L.M.Perry) N.Wikstr. & Neupane
- Neanotis trimera (Craib) W.H.Lewis
- Neanotis tubulosa (G.Don) Mabb.
- Neanotis urophylla (Wall. ex Wight & Arn.) W.H.Lewis
- Neanotis wightiana (Wall. ex Wight & Arn.) W.H.Lewis
