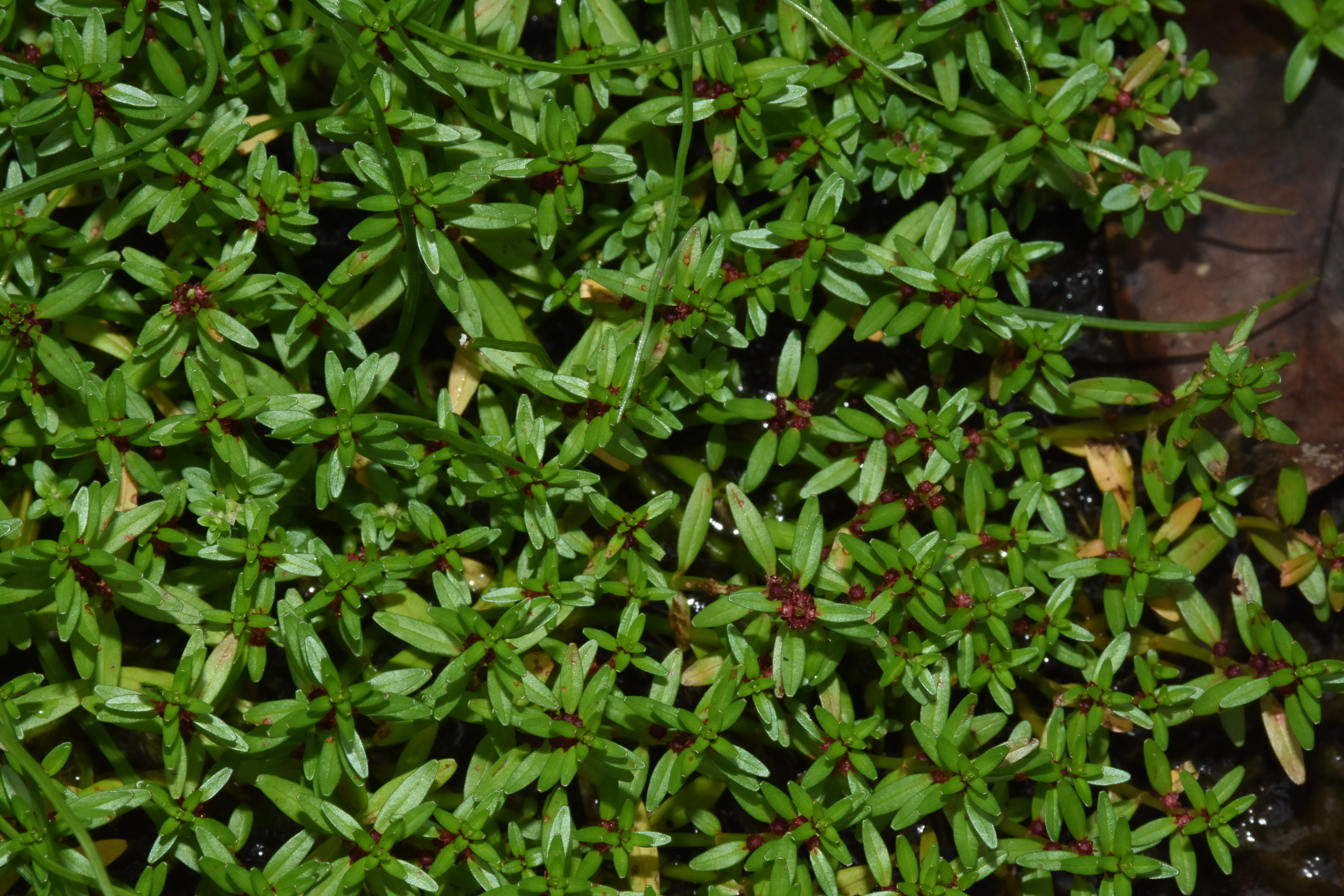
- Rotala malampuzhensis, near Neeliyarkottam

Conservation status
- Least Concern (IUCN 3.1)

Scientific classification
- Kingdom: Plantae
- Clade: Tracheophytes
- Clade: Angiosperms
- Clade: Eudicots
- Clade: Rosids
- Order: Myrtales
- Family: Lythraceae
- Genus: Rotala
- Species: R. malampuzhensis

Binomial name
- Rotala malampuzhensis R.V.Nair ex C.D.K.Cook

= Rotala malampuzhensis =

Species of herb

Rotala malampuzhensis is a terrestrial annual gregarious herb. It is endemic to the Western Ghats.

== Description ==
The stems are many branched, creeping and rooting below. Leaves are narrow, sessile, oppositely arranged alternately at right angles, microscopically truncate at apex. The flowers and fruits are solitary, sessile and crimson color.

== Distribution and habitat ==
In Kerala this plant is common in Alappuzha, Kozhikkode, Malappuram, Palakkad, Kottayam, and Kannur districts in moist areas.
